= Akkadian Empire =

State in Mesopotamia (c. 2334–2154 BC)

Coordinates: 33°6′N 44°6′E

Akkadian Empire 𒆳𒌵𒆠 (Akkadian) māt Akkadi 𒀀𒂵𒉈𒆠 (Sumerian) a-ga-de_{3}^{KI}
- c. 2334 – c. 2154 BC
- Map of the Akkadian Empire (brown) and the directions in which military campaigns were conducted (yellow arrows)
- Capital: Akkad
- Official languages: Akkadian (de jure); Sumerian (honorific and liturgical)
- Common languages: Akkadian (dominant); Sumerian (vernacular)
- Religion: Ancient Mesopotamian religion
- Government: Monarchy
- Šarrum (Kings)
  - c. 2334–2279 BC: Sargon (first)
  - c. 2168–2154 BC: Shu-turul (last)
- Historical era: Bronze Age
  - Established: c. 2334 BC
  - Conquests of Sargon of Akkad: c. 2340 – c. 2284 BC
  - Disestablished: c. 2154 BC

Area
- 2250 BC: 800,000 km^{2} (310,000 sq mi)
Preceded by	Succeeded by
Early Dynastic Period	Gutian Period (Sumer)
- Today part of: Iraq; Iran; Syria; Turkey

The Akkadian Empire (/əˈkeɪdiən/) or the Kingdom of Akkad/Agade (Note: Akkadian: ^{URU}Akkad KI "(city of) Akkad"; Biblical Hebrew: אַכַּד Akkad.) was an ancient kingdom established around 2300 BC, often seen as the first empire in world history, succeeding and unifying the long-lived city-states of the Early Dynastic Period.

Centered on the city of Akkad (/ˈækæd/ or /ˈɑːkɑːd/) and its surrounding region in modern-day Iraq, the empire united the Semitic Akkadian and Sumerian speakers under one rule and exercised significant influence across Mesopotamia, Syria and modern-day western Iran, sending expeditions as far south as Dilmun and Magan in the Arabian Peninsula.

Established by Sargon of Akkad after defeating the king Lugal-zage-si, it replaced the system of independent Sumero-Akkadian city-states and unified southern Mesopotamia, under a centralized government, its influence stretching from the Mediterranean to Iran and from Anatolia to the Persian Gulf. Sargon and his successors, especially his grandson Naram-Sin, consolidated the empire through military conquest, administrative reforms, and cultural integration. Naram-Sin took the unprecedented step of declaring himself a living god and adopted the title "King of the Four Quarters." The Semitic Akkadian language became the empire's lingua franca, although Sumerian (a language isolate) remained important in religion and literature. The empire is documented through official inscriptions, found on carved monuments or late copies, administrative tablets, seals and other artefacts. An innovative royal art redefined the image of kingship, emphasizing its heroic and martial aspects. Enheduanna, Sargon's daughter, served as high priestess and is often recognized as the first known named author in history.

Despite its strength, the empire faced internal revolts and external threats. Sargon's sons, Rimush and Manishtushu, struggled to maintain control; both may have died violently. Naram-Sin's successors were weaker, leading to fragmentation and vulnerability. The empire eventually collapsed, probably due to a combination of internal unrest and severe environmental and economic stress caused by a major drought associated with the 4.2-kiloyear climate event, and also external threats from the Gutians, Amorites, and Elamites. It nonetheless remained a point of reference throughout the rest of Mesopotamian history. It was notably commemorated in legends featuring Sargon and Naram-Sin, figures viewed by their royal successors as either models or counter-models.

== Sources ==
=== Archives ===
More than 8,000 cuneiform tablets help reconstructing the history of the Akkadian Empire. They date primarily from the reigns of Naram-Sin and Shar-Kali-Sharri. They come from several regions of the empire: in Lower Mesopotamia (Girsu, Umma, Nippur, Adab), in the Diyala Valley (Tell Asmar, Khafajah) and in adjacent regions (Susa in Elam, Gasur in Upper Mesopotamia, Tell Brak in Syria). This represents a change from the Early Dynastic Period, which is documented by a limited number of sites. However, the nature of the texts does not really change: they are essentially administrative tablets, written in Old Akkadian or Sumerian, which mainly document the management of agricultural estates belonging to institutions (palaces or temples), or sometimes to private individuals. They detail activities related to the management of these estates' resources, recording the movement of stored and redistributed goods, land grants, and annual financial statements for certain farms or workshops. A few hundred letters, legal documents, and school texts round out this body of material. Part of these tablets have become available on the antiquities market and are held in museums and private collections such as those from the Akkadian governor in Adab.

Our current understanding of the Akkadian dynasty, however, remains severely limited by the fact that the location of its capital, the city of Akkad/Agade, is still unknown, though there has been much speculation.

=== Commemorative Inscriptions ===
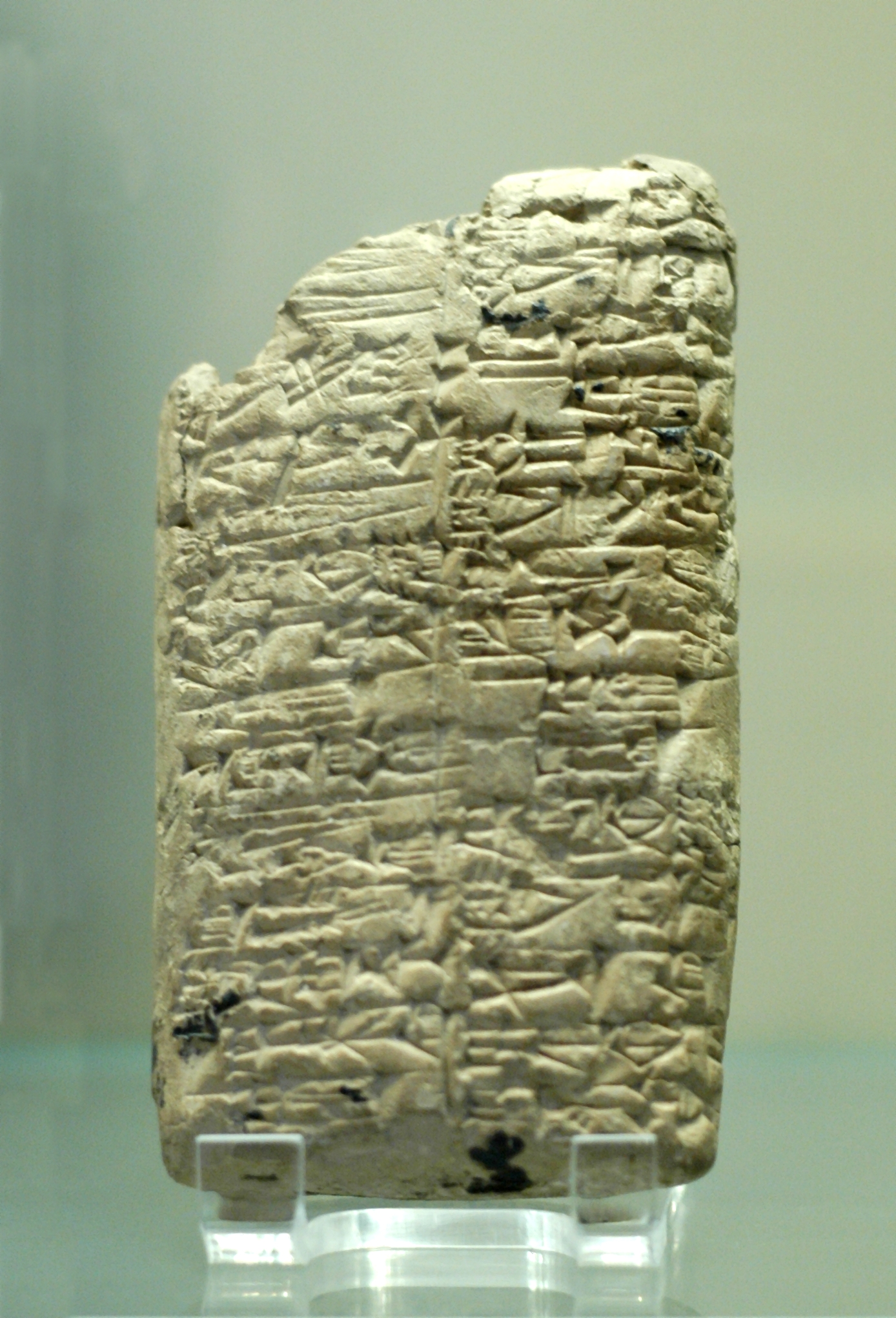
List of victories of Rimush, king of Akkad, over rulers of the Iranian plateau, copy on a clay tablet of a monumental inscription, c. 2270 BC.

The activities of the kings of Akkad are also known from commemorative inscriptions they commissioned.. Some were found on monuments dating from their reigns, but most are known to us because they were copied later, due to the prestige of these figures, particularly at the beginning of the 2nd millennium BC. They have come down to us indirectly. Some tablets compile several inscriptions of the kings of Akkad.

One of the longer surviving examples is the Bassetki Statue, the copper base of a Naram-Sin statue:

"Naram-Sin, the mighty, king of Agade, when the four quarters together revolted against him, through the love which the goddess Astar showed him, he was victorious in nine battles in one in 1 year, and the kings whom they (the rebels[?]) had raised (against him), he captured. In view of the fact that he protected the foundations of his city from danger, (the citizens of his city requested from Astar in Eanna, Enlil in Nippur, Dagan in Tuttul, Ninhursag in Kes, Ea in Eridu, Sin in Ur, Samas in Sippar, (and) Nergal in Kutha, that (Naram-Sin) be (made) the god of their city, and they built within Agade a temple (dedicated) to him. As for the one who removes this inscription, may the gods Samas, Astar, Nergal, the bailiff of the king, namely all those gods (mentioned above) tear out his foundations and destroy his progeny."

A number of fragments of royal statues of Manishtushu all bearing portions of a "standard inscription". Aside from a few minor short inscriptions this is the only known contemporary source for this ruler. An excerpt:

"Man-istusu, king of the world: when he conquered Ansan and Sirihum, had ... ships cross the Lower Sea. The cities across the Sea, thirty-two (in number), assembled for battle, but he was victorious (over them). Further, he conquered their cities, [st]ru[c]k down their rulers and aft[er] he [roused them (his troops)], plundered as far as the Silver Mines. He quarried the black stone of the mountains across the Lower Sea, loaded (it) on ships, and moored (the ships) at the quay of Agade"

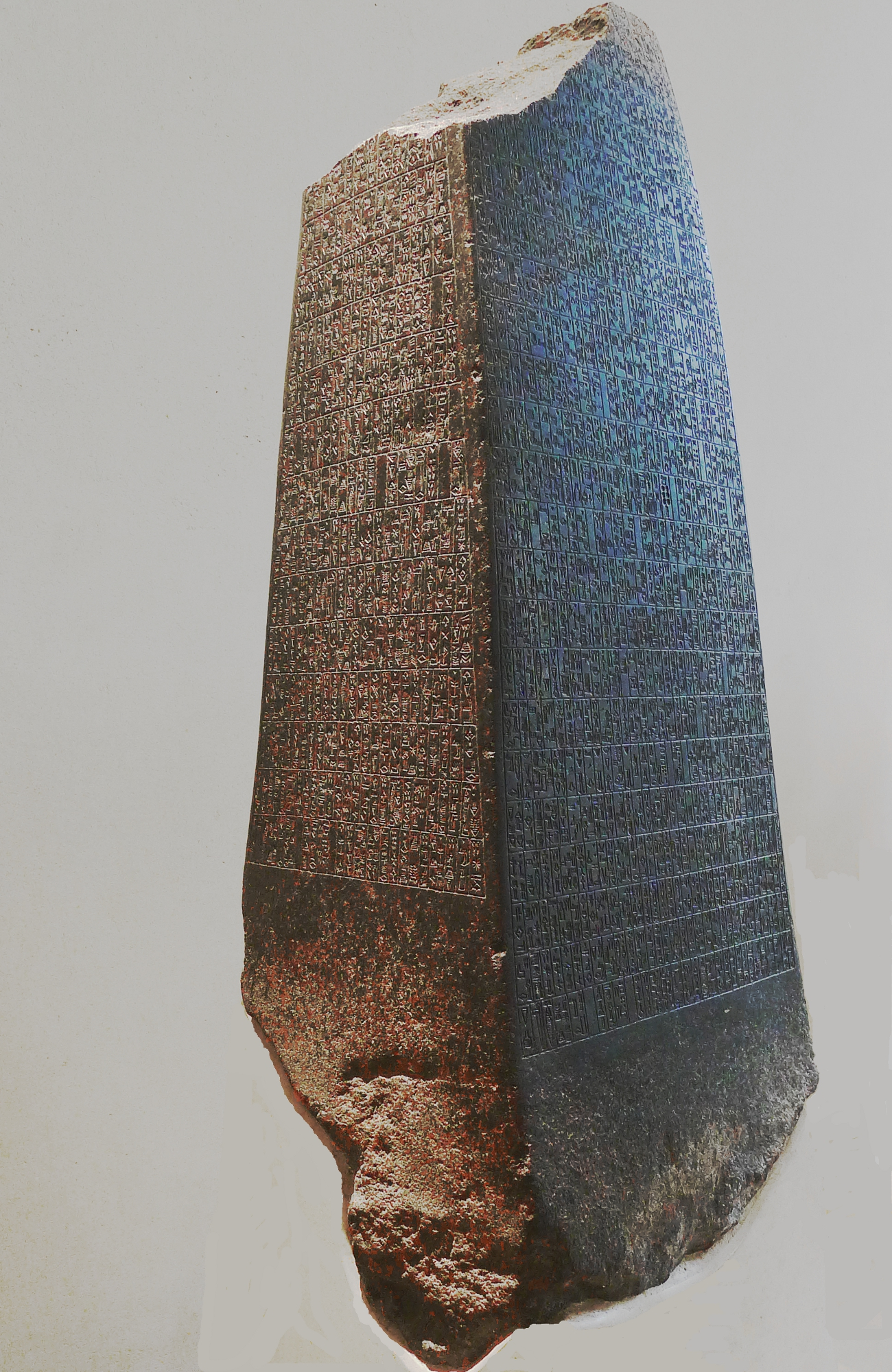
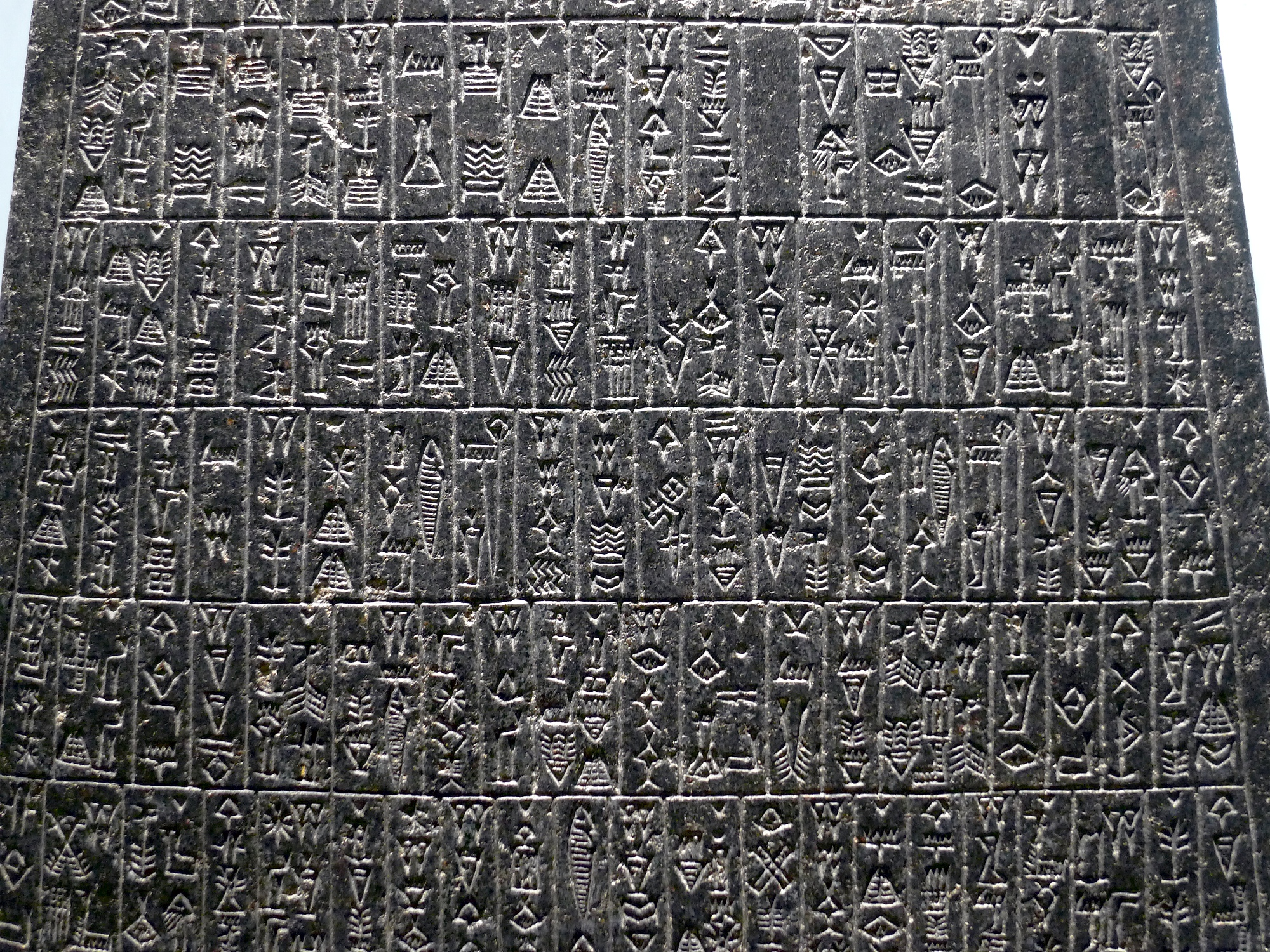
Manishtushu Obelisk, with close-up of the text. 2270–2255 BC, Louvre Museum

Among the texts commemorating the king’s achievements are also the year names: following a practice that became widespread during this period to distinguish between years, a year was given a name in reference to a major event that had occurred the previous year. These names are used to date certain administrative texts, and this is how historians generally identify them. In principle, this is very useful for reconstructing the chronological sequence of events during a reign, provided that all of a king’s year names are known and that it is possible to arrange them in order. However, for the kings of Akkad, the list is very incomplete, and we do not know in what order to arrange them. 3 of the presumed 40 Sargon year-names are known, 1 (presumed 9) of Rimush, 20 (presumed 56) of Naram-Sin, and 18 (presumed 18) of Shar-kali-shari.

As an example, from one year-name, we know that the empire was in conflict with the Gutians before its end. It attests the name of a Gutian ruler and marks the construction of two temples in Babylon as recognition of Akkadian victory:

In the year in which Shar-kali-sharri laid the foundations of the temples of the goddess Annunitum and of the god Aba in Babylon and took prisoner Sharlag(ab) the king of Gutium.

=== Legendary Tradition ===
The kings of Akkad were also the subject of legends that arose after the fall of their kingdom, from the time of their successors of the Third Dynasty of Ur (21st century BC) until the end of Mesopotamian civilization. They are mentioned in pseudo-historical texts as omens, chronicles (notably the Sumerian King List), and a cycle of legendary texts featuring Sargon and Naram-Sin as protagonists. However, it remains to separate fact from fiction in these often highly fictionalized traditions. Historians have long assumed that these texts were based on a core of events that actually took place during the Akkadian period, around which their authors wove fictional narratives. But the current trend is to rely on them less and less when reconstructing the history of the reigns of Sargon and Naram-Sin. While some legends refer to events known from the inscriptions of the Akkadian kings, many were written without any knowledge of the historical facts of that era. They reveal more about the time they were written than about the period they supposedly describe. Historians’ approaches therefore vary: some do not use them to write a history of the Akkadian Empire, while others still draw on them, but cautiously.

=== Art and Archaeology ===
The Akkadian period is also documented by various non-textual sources. These include works of art, which also come from several sites, notably Susa, where a number of them were brought as spoils by Elamite rulers in the second half of the 2nd millennium following military campaigns in the Kingdom of Babylon. These are sculpted monuments (statues and stelae) glorifying the kings of Akkad, generally known only in fragmentary form, depicting primarily their military conquests and bearing inscriptions. The other important iconographic source for this period are cylinder seals, known either directly through the discovery of the original object or indirectly through the presence of its impression on a clay tablet or bulla. They provide an abundant corpus of images (approximately 2,000 objects and impressions), and some of them bear inscriptions identifying their owner.

It is difficult to identify the archaeological levels of the Akkadian period at sites in Lower Mesopotamia, due to the absence of a material culture and architecture that clearly distinguish it from the preceding Early Dynastic III period. Likewise, material that is thought to be Akkadian continues to be in use into the Ur III period. The existence of a characteristic pottery of the Akkadian Empire remains a matter of debate. Moreover, artistic developments occurred gradually during the Akkadian Empire period, so that the true break took place under Manishtusu and Naram-Sin of Akkad. The archaeological documentation from the Akkadian period in the southern Mesopotamian plain is very limited: a kind of manor house at Umm el-Jir (Mugdan), near Kish, whose tablets indicate that it served as an administrative center belonging to members of the royal family, and a partially excavated administrative building at Tell el-Wilayah, which also yielded objects and tablets from the period. The main constructions of this period have been identified at peripheral sites, reorganized after their conquest: Khafajah, Tell Asmar, Tell Suleimah, Tell Brak, Tell Leilan, Tell Beydar.

== Dating and periodization ==
The Akkadian period is generally dated to 2334–2154 BC (according to the middle chronology). The short-chronology dates of 2270–2083 BC are now considered less likely. It was preceded by the Early Dynastic Period of Mesopotamia (ED) and succeeded by the Ur III Period, although both transitions are blurry. For example, it is likely that the rise of Sargon of Akkad coincided with the late ED Period and that the final Akkadian kings ruled simultaneously with the Gutian kings alongside rulers at the city-states of both Uruk and Lagash. The Akkadian Period is contemporary with Early Bronze (EB) IV (in Israel), EB IVA and Early Jezirah (EJ) IV (in Syria), and EB IIIB (in Turkey).

=== Timeline of rulers ===
The relative order of Akkadian kings is clear, while noting that the Ur III version of the Sumerian King List inverts the order of Rimush and Manishtushu. The absolute dates of their reigns are approximate (as with all dates prior to the Late Bronze Age collapse c. 1200 BC).

Ruler		Middle chronology All dates BC	Family tree
Sargon		2334–2279	
Rimush		2279–2270	
Manishtushu		2270–2255	
Naram-Sin		2255–2218	
Shar-Kali-Sharri		2218–2193	
Dudu	Alabaster vase of Dudu of Akkad Louvre Museum AO 31549	2189–2168	
Shu-turul	Votive_hammer_of_Shu-turul	2168–2154	

== History and development of the empire ==
=== Pre-Sargonic Akkad ===
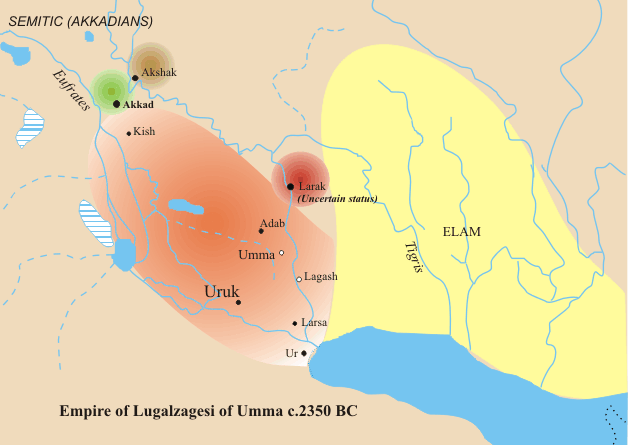
Akkad before expansion (in green). The territory of Sumer under its last king Lugal-zage-si appears in orange. Circa 2350 BC

The Akkadian Empire takes its name from the region and the city of Akkad, both of which were localized in the general confluence area of the Tigris and Euphrates Rivers. Although the city of Akkad has not yet been identified on the ground, it is known from various textual sources. Among these is at least one text predating the reign of Sargon. Together with the fact that the name Akkad is of non-Akkadian origin, this suggests that the city of Akkad may have already been occupied in pre-Sargonic times.

=== Sargon ===
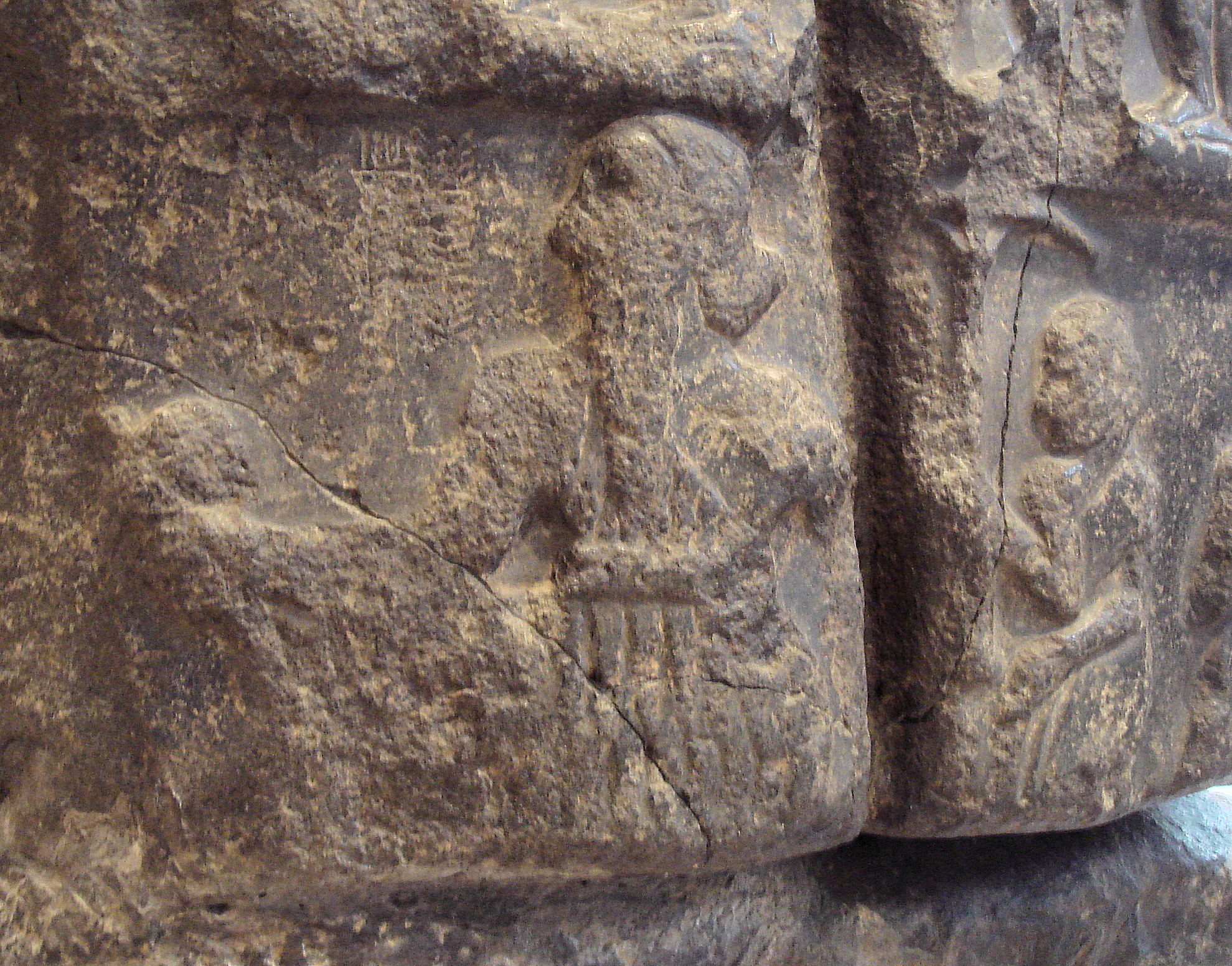
Sargon on his victory stele, with a royal hair bun, holding a mace and wearing a flounced royal coat on his left shoulder with a large belt (left), followed by an attendant holding a royal umbrella. The name of Sargon in cuneiform ("King Sargon") appears faintly in front of his face. Louvre Museum.

The Akkadian Empire was, above all, the work of a man who has gone down in history as one of the greatest kings of Mesopotamian history: Sargon. Much has been written about him in various texts of the later Mesopotamian tradition, to the point that it is often difficult to distinguish legend from reality.

One fact is consistent across several traditions: Sargon was a usurper. In any case, he is not known to have had a father or a predecessor on the throne of Akkad, which until then had been a marginal city. He therefore ascended the throne (around 2334 BC, or later around 2316, or even around 2285) under circumstances that remain unclear. Drawing on later legends, some historians have suggested that Sargon was a vassal of King Ur-Zababa of Kish, who successfully rebelled against him and thus became the ruler of the northern part of Lower Mesopotamia. Given the fictional nature of this legend and its late origin, such a scenario remains hypothetical.

In any case, Sargon appears to have shaken up the political situation in the region—which was usually under the control of the kings of Kish—and succeeded in establishing his dominance there during the early part of his reign. He then found himself facing the most powerful king in southern Mesopotamia, Lugal-zage-si, who reigned in Uruk. According to copies of his inscriptions dating from after his reign, Sargon defeated him (around 2300 BC, perhaps in 2292), bringing all of Lower Mesopotamia as far as the Persian Gulf under his control. The defeated king was captured, forced to wear a yoke, and paraded during Sargon’s triumphal procession in Nippur, the holy city of southern Mesopotamia. The other Sumerian cities were subjugated. Sargon installed governors loyal to his cause in several of the ancient city-states of Sumer, thereby establishing for the first time a vast kingdom encompassing the entire southern part of Mesopotamia, with Akkad—elevated to the status of capital—at its center.

After subjugating southern Mesopotamia, Sargon led expeditions towards the adjacent regions to the northwest and east. In Upper Mesopotamia, he likely defeated the kingdom of Mari, and perhaps also Ebla in Syria. However, the chronology of the conquests by the kings of Akkad to the west remains unclear, and it is not known whether the destruction documented at sites in the region was caused by the conquests of Sargon, Naram-Sin, or by conflicts between local kingdoms. An inscription by Sargon states that he traveled as far as Tuttul on the middle Euphrates, where he paid homage to the great syrian god Dagan, who is said to have then granted him dominion over the lands extending to the Mediterranean Sea.

Sargon waged wars to the east, on the Iranian Plateau. He claimed to have defeated Elam (notably in a year name) and the distant land of Marhashi (Parahshum). A year name also mentions his victory over Urua (or Arawa), a city located on the route between Mesopotamia and Elam. The land of Simurrum, located in the western Zagros Mountains north of the Diyala Valley, was also one of his conquests, commemorated in a year name. It is more doubtful that Sargon carried out conquests in the Persian Gulf, as far as the land of Magan (Oman), as has been suggested based on a hypothetical interpretation of a passage from a fragmentary inscription by his grandson Naram-Sin.

In any case, it is clear from these sources that Sargon undertook military campaigns much farther afield than the kings who preceded him, which made a strong impression on people. But at this stage, this clearly did not translate into attempts at lasting domination. The continuity between his reign and that of several kings who preceded him, such as Enshakushana and Lugal-zage-si, means that Sargon appears in many respects to be the last ruler of the era of the Early dynasties. But there are also many arguments for viewing Sargon’s reign as a turning point in Mesopotamian history, establishing a model that was replicated by many kings after him, often with reference to his deeds. He is someone who began to create something that did not exist before, and who was undoubtedly viewed as an extraordinary figure even in his own time.

However, his political enterprise was undoubtedly still in gestation at the time of his death, and it was up to his successors, who faced several revolts in the conquered countries, to consolidate it and make it long-term. His inscriptions, which proclaim his hegemonic ambitions, lay the foundations for Akkadian royal ideology, and his military campaigns set the course that his successors’ armies would follow once again.

=== Rimush and Manishtushu ===
Sargon died around 2279 BC (or 2229). Two of his sons succeeded him, Rimush and Manishtushu. It is usually considered that the former reigned before the latter, but it could be the other way around, as this is how the oldest known version of the Sumerian King List presents the order of succession of the kings of Akkad. Regardless of that, it appears that they are able to preserve the legacy left by their father. For the first time, the conquests of a great king are not lost upon his death.

Rimush, who is said to have reigned for nine years, faced a rebellion as soon as he ascended the throne. He resisted and subdued the rebels led by Kaku of Ur, who had rallied several cities to his cause (Adab, Lagash, Zabalam, Kazallu). He also waged campaigns against kingdoms on the Iranian Plateau (Elam, Awan, Marhashi). He may have been assassinated.

During his fifteen-year reign, Manishtushu also led campaigns into the Iranian Plateau (against Anshan, Sherihum) and into the Persian Gulf, as he claimed to have subjugated the land of Magan (Oman). He may also have been assassinated.

=== Naram-Sin ===
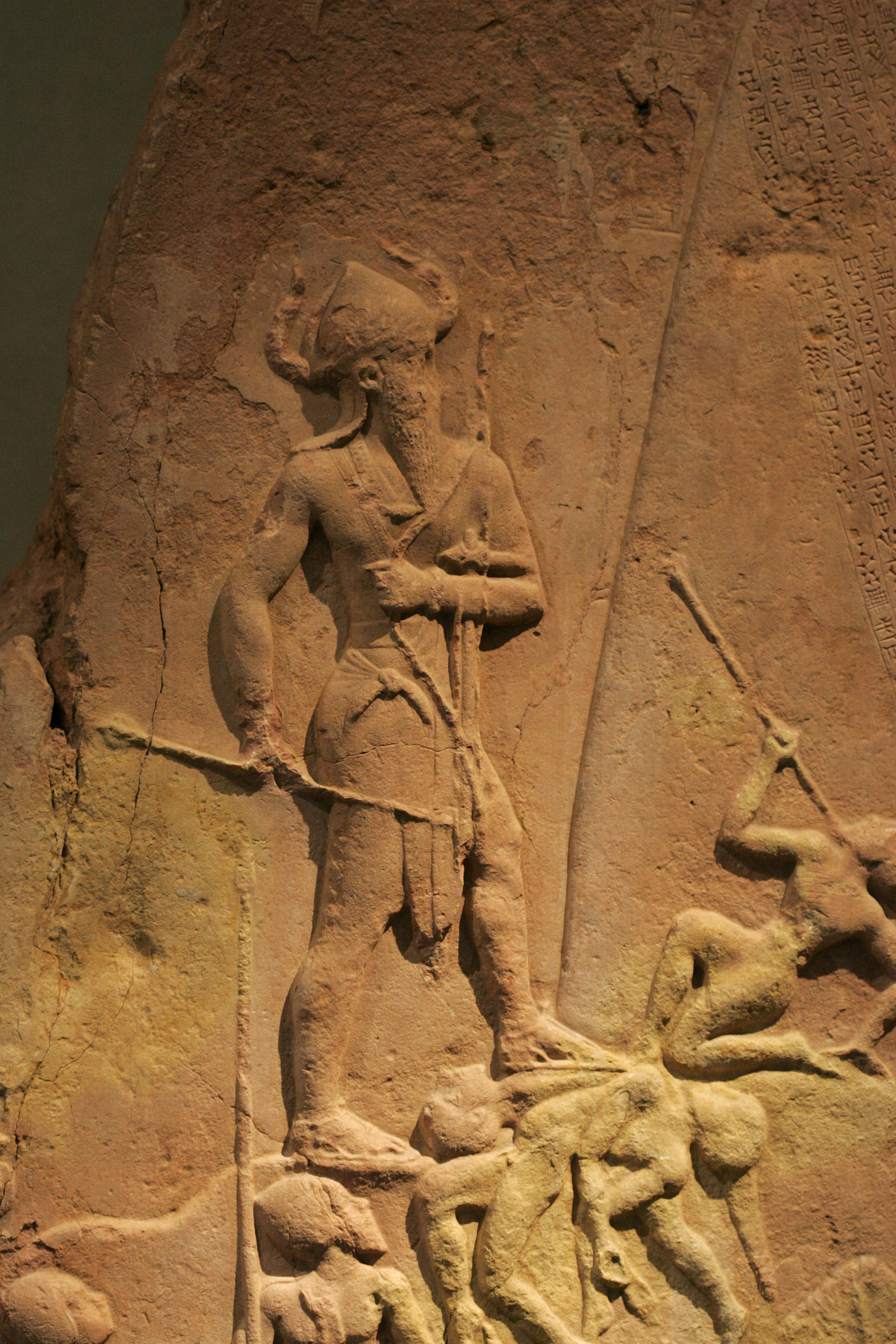
King Naram-Sin standing over Lullubian corpses. Victory Stele of Naram-Sin, detail.

Naram-Sin ascended the throne around 2254 BC (or 2202 BC) Like his grandfather Sargon, he became a major figure in Mesopotamian historical traditions, but he left a more negative image.

At some unspecified point during his reign, he had to confront a major rebellion in Lower Mesopotamia, led by at least two figures: Iphur-Kish in Kish, who rallied neighboring cities (Sippar, Eresh, Kazallu) and Amar-girid of Uruk, joined by other cities in the south (Ur, Lagash, Adab, Shuruppak, etc.). According to the texts and traditions relating to this great revolt, these uprisings were on the verge of success, but the Akkadian armies managed to quell them after several battles. This event appears to have been a turning point in Naram-Sin’s reign, and more broadly in the history of his kingdom. In particular, it is believed that the king was deified following this triumph and that he then launched major reforms aimed at consolidating the unity of his empire.

Naram-Sin was also a great conqueror. His reign was marked by expeditions into Upper Mesopotamia and northern Syria, likely continuing in the footsteps of his grandfather, although it is possible that he was the first Akkadian king to firmly subjugate this region. In any case, it was during his reign that permanent Akkadian administrative and military settlements were established outside of Lower Mesopotamia (Gasur, Nagar, Susa). Naram-Sin also commemorated his reaching the sources of the Tigris and Euphrates by naming a year after the event. One of his stelae was unearthed at Pir Hüseyin, near present-day Diyarbakır, in the upper reaches of the Tigris. It is possible that Naram-Sin went even further, but this requires confirmation. Naram-Sin is also said to have subjugated Magan.

The reign of Naram-Sin marked the moment when the Akkadian Empire "reached the heights of its power and internal development." It is often believed that it is only from that point on that it deserves to be called an “empire.” Notably, "there are signs in the wording of his inscriptions that this monarch had a complex relationship with his dynastic origins, eager to distinguish himself by redoing more perfectly all that had been done before and to reach out much further in the fulfillment of cosmocratic dreams." Naram-Sin transformed the kingdom of Akkad through his impressive military campaigns and reforms. His reign saw a strengthening of Akkadian imperial control over its provinces. Administrative practices were standardized at the central government level and disseminated throughout all subordinate administrative centers, which came under increasingly tight control by the royal administration.

But it is also clear that Naram-Sin was a highly divisive figure, who was undoubtedly hated by many, particularly in southern Sumer, which could be the result of the major changes he imposed on this region. This may explain his rather negative image in the Sumerian tradition as reflected in the Curse of Akkad.

=== The Fall of Akkad ===
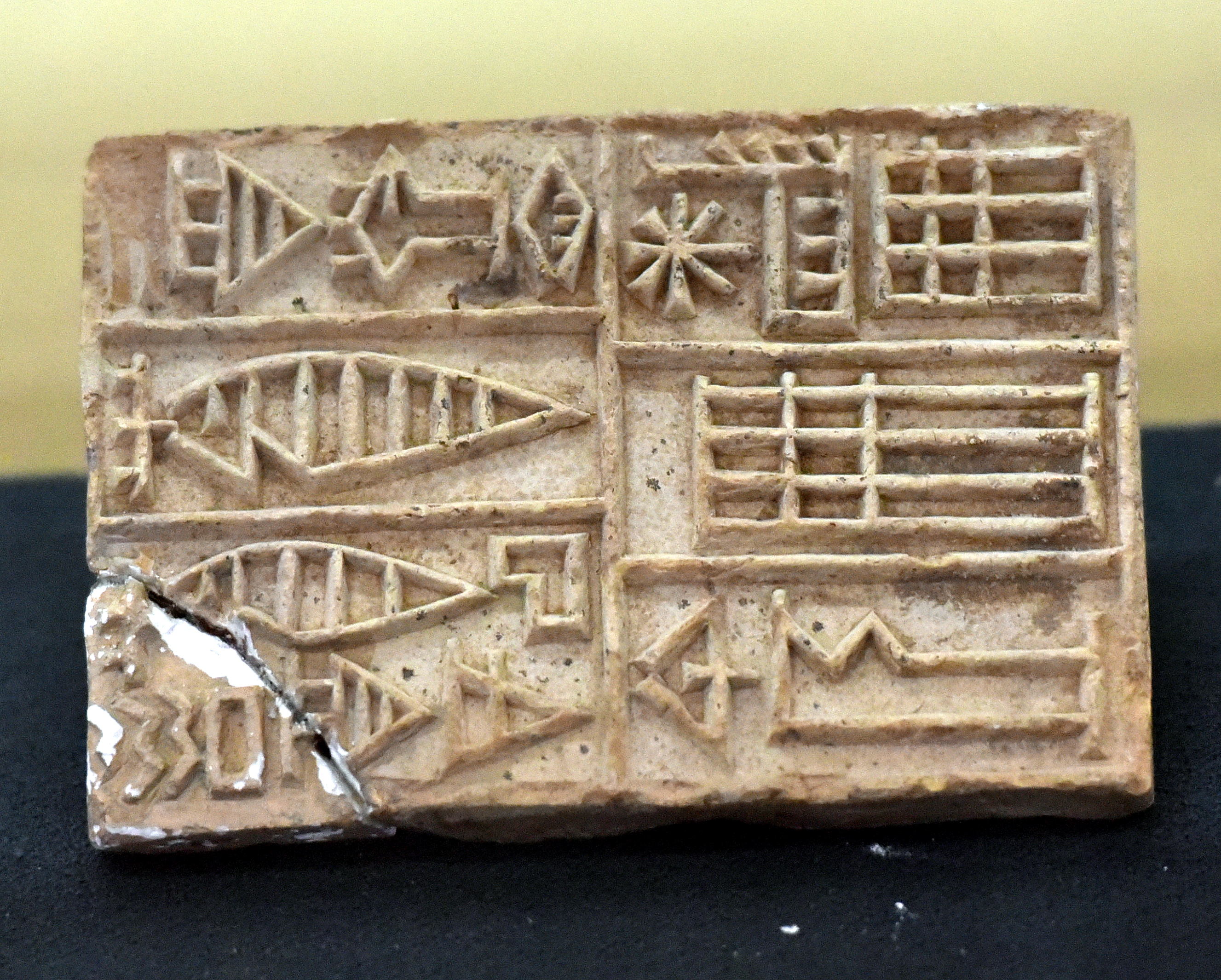
A brick stamp inscribed with the name of Shar-Kali-Sharri. Iraq Museum.

The reign of Shar-Kali-Sharri, son of Naram-Sin, who came to power around 2217 BC (or 2205, or 2165 BC), is the best documented in administrative records, but little is known about the political and military events of that time. This king is omitted from later accounts of the fall of Akkad, which refer only to his father. The few inscriptions dating from this reign bear witness to the decline of imperial ambitions.

This period saw the emergence of a new threat: the Gutians, a people considered "barbaric" by the Mesopotamians and originating from the western regions of the Zagros. The Gutians launched several raids into Mesopotamia during the final decades of the Akkadian Empire and ultimately settle in the vicinity of Adab. Mesopotamian tradition, as recorded in the Sumerian King List and the Curse of Akkad, holds them responsible for the fall of that state, marked by numerous acts of violence and impiety. The sources from this period also show the rise of other external threats: the Elamites in the East, and the Amorites in the West.

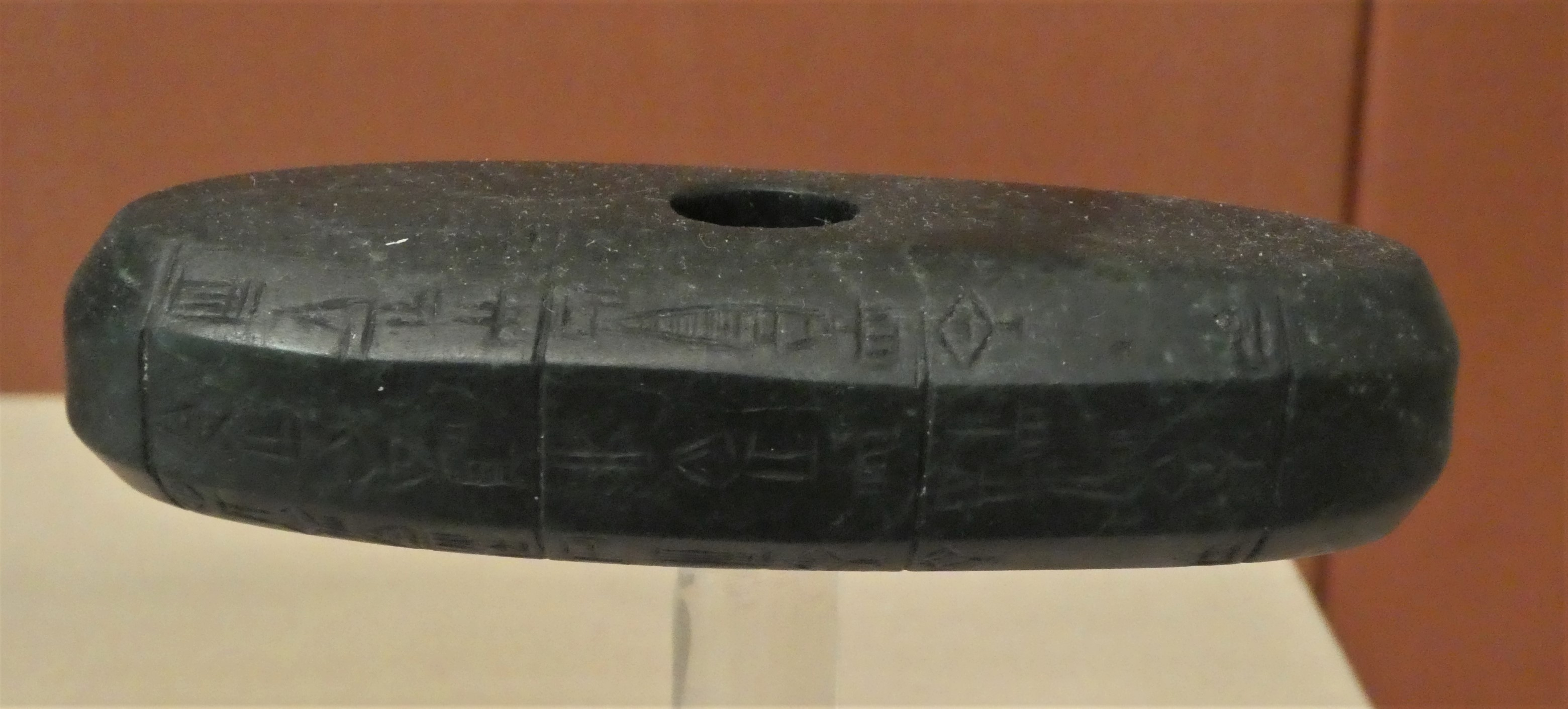
Mace head bearing an inscription of Shu-turul, one of the last known kings of Akkad. British Museum.

And yet, the kingdom of Akkad appears to have survived for several decades after the death of Shar-Kali-Sharri, which occurred around 2193 BC (or 2140 BC). Even though it was considerably reduced in size and was likely limited to northern Babylonia around Akkad and Kish, since the Sumerian King List attributes several successors to it. Of one of them, Dudu, a few votive inscriptions and references to military campaigns are known, which were likely intended to preserve what remained of his kingdom. His successor, Shu-turul, is known only from a handful of votive inscriptions. However, these two kings do not appear to have belonged to the dynasty of Sargon’s descendants.

The causes of the fall of the Akkadian Empire remain a mystery and a matter of debate. As mentioned earlier, the explanation attributed to invasions by external “barbarians”—the Gutians—as held by Mesopotamian tradition, is now viewed with some skepticism, though it has not been completely rejected. Other hypotheses suggest that a climate change, the 4.2-kiloyear event, affected sites in Upper Mesopotamia, contributing to this decline through the desertification of certain regions and population movements (particularly among the Amorites). In 2019, a study by Hokkaido University on fossil corals in Oman provides an evidence that prolonged winter shamal seasons led to the salinization of the irrigated fields; hence, a dramatic decrease in crop production triggered a widespread famine and eventually the collapse of the ancient Akkadian Empire.

But this remains highly debated. The chronology of the Akkadian Empire is very uncertain and that available evidence is not sufficient to show its economic dependence on the northern areas and others. Akkadian writings should not be taken literally to describe certain catastrophic events. The causes of the decline of settlements in the North may lie elsewhere, notably in social restructuring that favored a sedentary lifestyle, and be multifactorial; moreover, several important sites remained populated and active after the Akkadian period. More importantly, internal factors were also at play: during the century of their hegemony, the kings of Akkad were never able to quell the independence movements of the city-states subjugated by Sargon, which regularly revolted and were able to quickly regain their autonomy once the kings’ authority waned. At this stage, the empire was not a structure based on extensive political and economic integration. Its control over the outside world was often nominal at best, which explains how quickly it lost that control.

In any case, this seems to indicate that the fall of Akkad was gradual. It appears that the empire’s gradual decline gave rise to new ambitions, including those of the Gutian kings, but also of figures from various regions of the empire or its neighboring areas, who then declared their independence. This is evidenced in Susa, with king Puzur-Inshushinak, who led raids into Akkad; in Upper Mesopotamia with Tish-atal in Urkesh (Tell Mozan); or in the land of Sumer in Lagash with the “dynasty” of Gudea, and in Uruk with the kingdom of Utu-hegal, which gave rise to the Ur III dynasty founded by Ur-Namma.

== Government and society ==
=== The 'first empire' ===
With Akkad, for the first time in the history of the Middle East, a large state structure emerged that, for several decades, encompassed a group of former microstates. It is often seen as the 'first empire' of this part of the world, crafted by larger-than-life figures such as Sargon and Naram-Sin. Imperial development manifested itself through "administrative measures, such as metrological reform and the imposition of uniform royal standards, and cultural measures, such as reform of writing and script, the dissemination of images of the ruler from a central workshop, and the spread of the Akkadian language and record-keeping to Sumer, Iran, and northern Syria, prove that there was much more to the Akkadian Empire than heroic campaigns, expanded trade, and the accumulation of booty."

These developments gradually led to a shift in the conception of the ruler’s function. Previously confined to the framework of the city-state, the king’s role was limited in scope. With the establishment of a vast kingdom under the Akkadian dynasty, it gradually took on a new dimension. This was particularly evident during the reign of Naram-Sin, who developed a truly 'imperial' mindset. He called himself “King of the Four Quarters (of the Earth)” (šar kibrāt(im) arba'im), i.e. of the entire known world. That reflects an ambition for universal domination, unprecedented in the Mesopotamian world and later adopted by subsequent generations of rulers. He also innovated by deifiying himself. He added the determinative of the deity before his name. He had himself referred to as the “god of Akkad,” and a cult in his honor was established. In some depictions, he wears the horned tiara, an attribute of the gods. The king is thus divine in essence, even if he is not necessarily considered a full-fledged deity (this is a matter of debate). He is, in any case, above other men.

Historiography of this period has often focused on the question of to what extent it was justified to describe the Akkadian state as the 'first empire.' The answer will depend largely on the definition of 'empire' that is adopted, and on whether it is compared to what came before or what came after. Thus, if we focus on the fact that an empire is, like later Assyria, an entity constantly oriented toward territorial expansion leading to domination of the entire known world, we cannot consider the Akkadian Empire to be one. Furthermore, this state has emerged as both less innovative than long believed and as a short-lived entity whose authority was never firmly established or sustainably secured, even in the central provinces. It also lacked a feature often cited by archaeologists: the influence of the central region’s material culture on conquered and neighboring territories, since it appears to have been limited. According to some, the real change is to be found rather in the emergence of imperialism and an imperial ideology, even if this did not truly materialize on the ground through the formation of an integrated and enduring political structure.

Beyond this debate, although it did not arise out of nowhere, the political entity built by Sargon and his successors undoubtedly represents something new in Mesopotamian history, through its ambitions and achievements.

=== Army and warfare ===
Nasiriyah Victory Stele of Naram-Sin
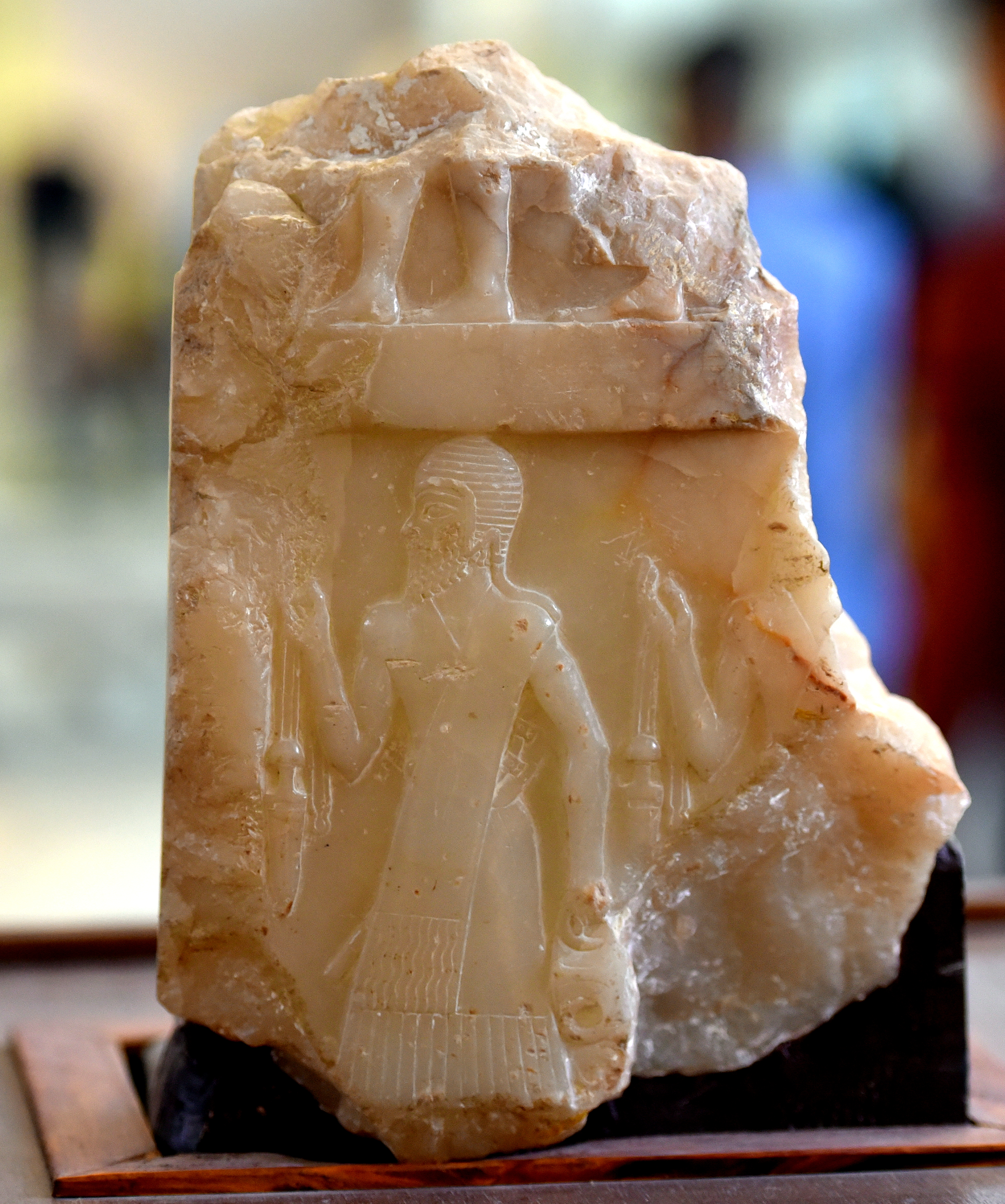
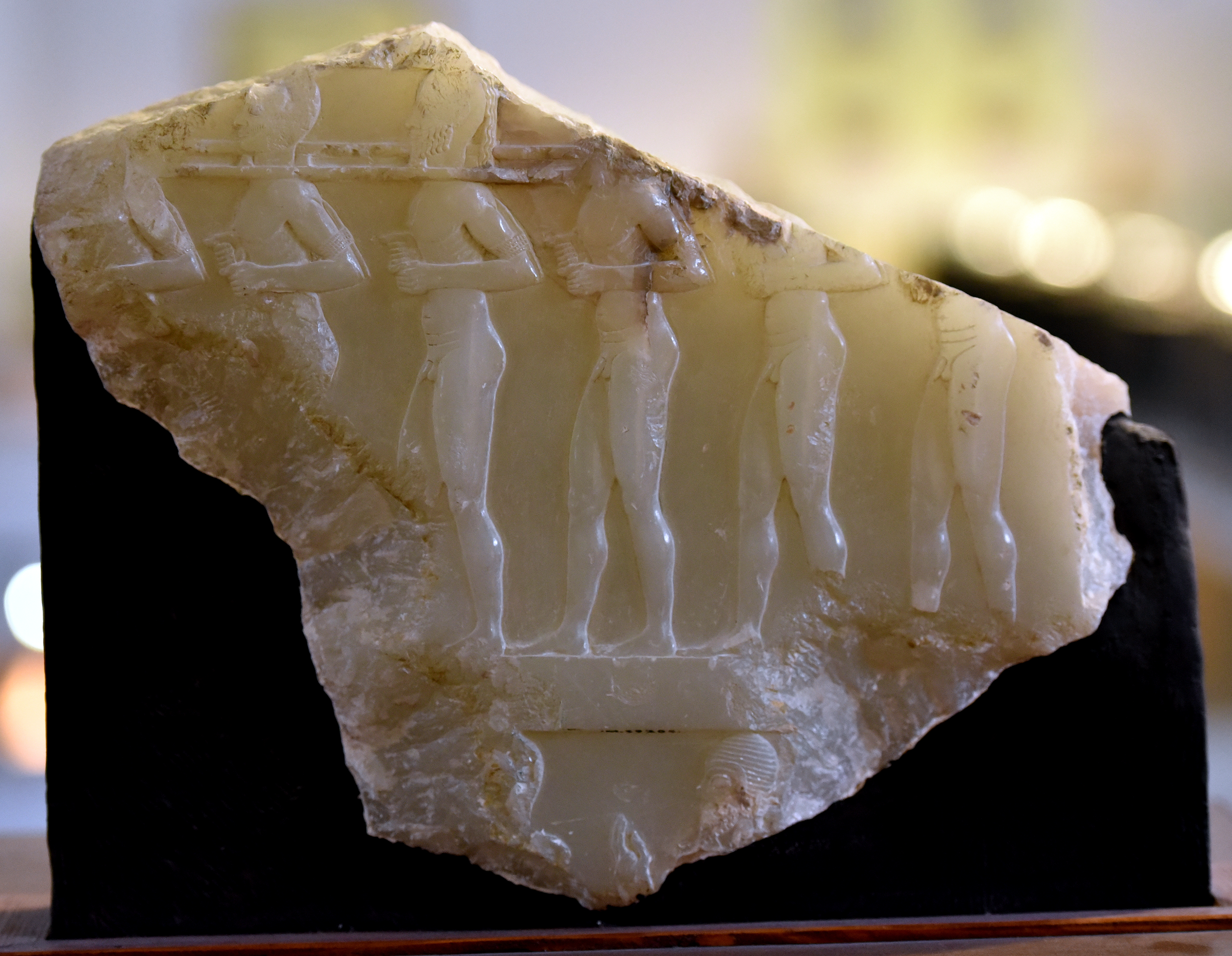
Soldier with sword, naked captives, on the Nasiriyah stele of Naram-Sin.

The army was the primary tool of domination for the Akkadian kings, whose power had a very pronounced military aspect. Inscriptions and images of the Akkadian kings, such as Naram-Sin’s victory stele, reflect a warrior ideology by emphasizing conflicts and military victories.

The king is the supreme commander of the armies, which he leads in person onto the battlefield. Little is known about the Akkadian military organization: at its head were “generals,” šakkanakkum (Sumerian šagina), who commanded hierarchically organized army corps. The commanders of these units may be the figures standing directly behind the king on the Victory Stele of Naram-Sin. One of Sargon's inscriptions mentions that he fed 5,400 men at his table every day; these are generally understood to be soldiers personally loyal to the king, forming a true professional army (a royal guard?). A Naram-Sin's inscription mentions the “Nine Regiments of Akkad,” which appear to have been the core of his army.

Iconographic depictions of soldiers from this period seem to indicate an evolution in soldiers’ weaponry and combat techniques compared to what is shown in the military scenes of the Early Dynastic Period (Standard of Ur and Stele of the Vultures from Girsu). Battle chariots appear to have lost importance in favor of the infantry. The infantry was equipped with lighter gear than before, which likely facilitated their mobility at the expense of their protection. The basic armament consisted of maces, daggers, and spears, as before, but also included the bow, which had previously been absent from military scenes. Analysis of the depictions seems to indicate the use of a composite bow, which had a long range and allowed for the implementation of new long-range combat tactics.

Military victories resulted in looting, the capture of enemies, and even their execution. The defeated soldiers are depicted on several monuments of the kings of Akkad, sometimes dead or dying, or begging for mercy, or at other times taken prisoner. The lengthy inscription on the Great Revolt of Naram-Sin repeatedly lists the enemy leaders who were captured and their soldiers who were killed by the hundreds or even thousands. The rebellious cities were destroyed, and Kish was deliberately flooded.

=== Royal family and elite ===
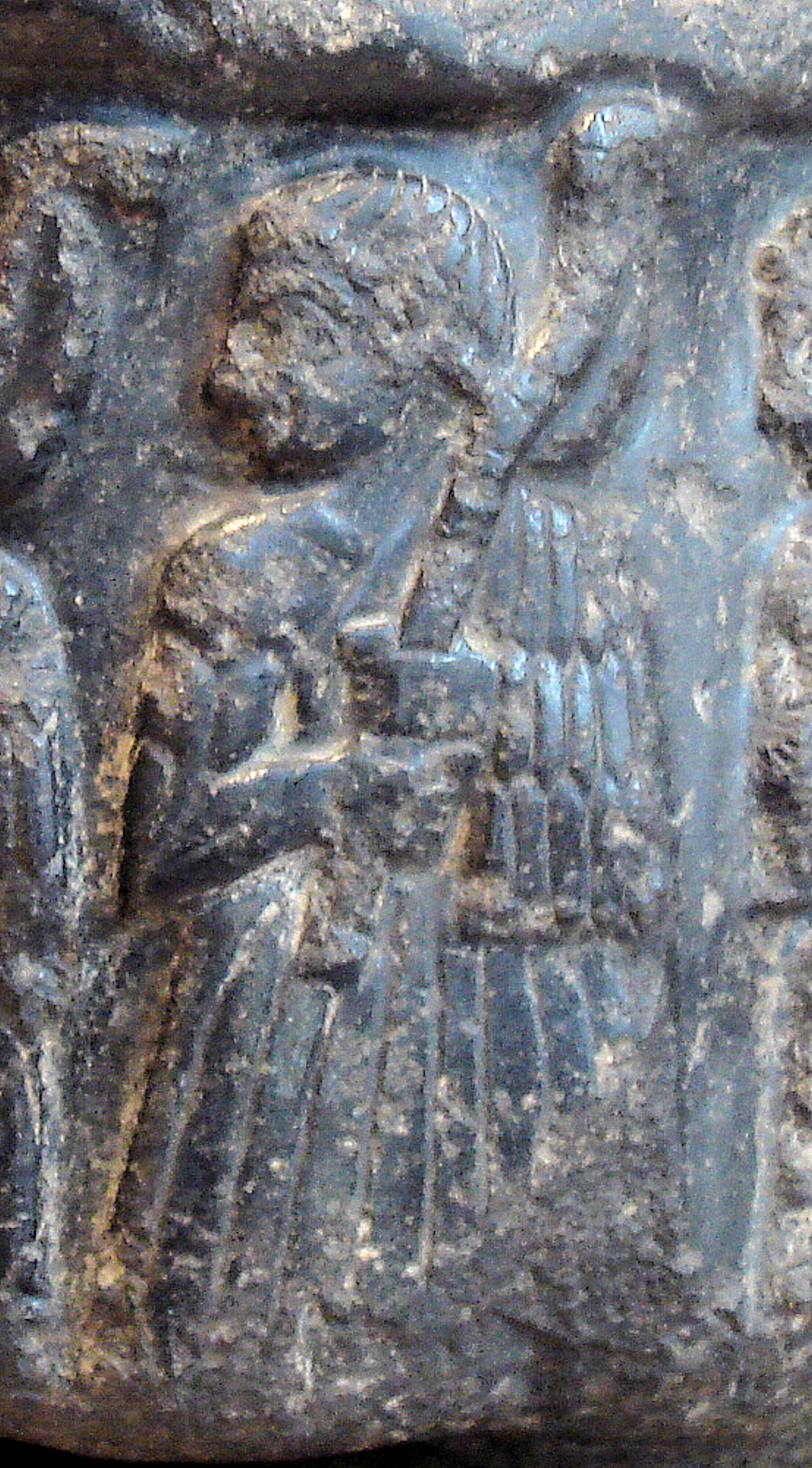
Akkadian official in the retinue of Sargon of Akkad, holding an axe.

The king stands at the top of his kingdom, from where responsibilities are then distributed among members of the civil and military administrations. It is unclear whether there is some kind of "council" assisting the king in making the most crucial decisions. He relies heavily on his family to rule, but more broadly, the kingdom is conceived as a kind of extended family in which he is the patriarch, granting and withdrawing offices, honors, and favors at will.

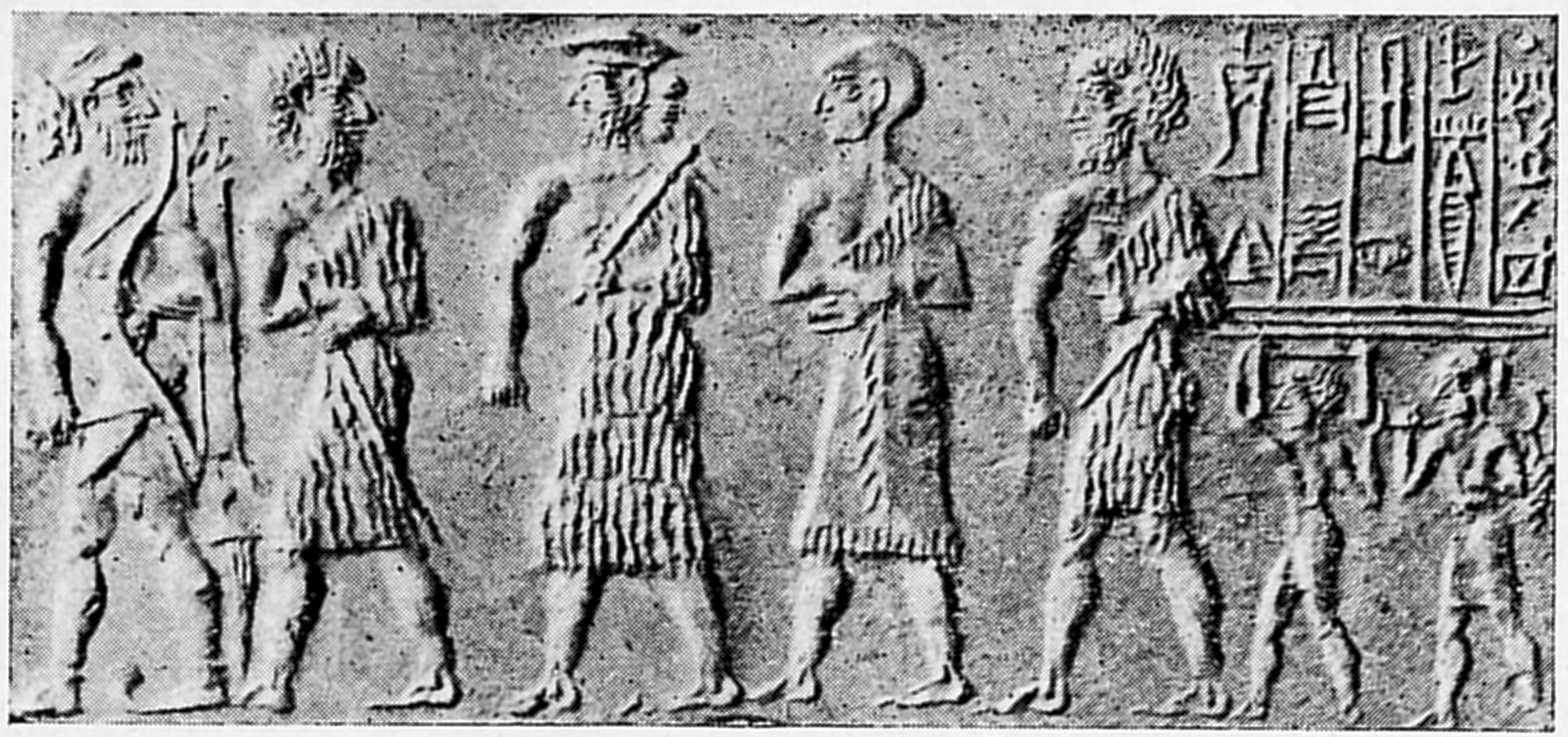
Cylinder seal of the scribe Kalki, showing Prince Ubil-Eshtar, probable brother of Sargon, with dignitaries (an archer in front, the scribe holding a tablet following the Prince, and two dignitaries with weapons).

From the very beginning of the empire, the royal family was involved in the exercise of power. However, it appears to have been plagued by internal tensions, as several later traditions report that Rimush and Manishtushu were assassinated, possibly at the instigation of members of the royal family. There is no evidence of such tensions during the reign of Naram-Sin, who relied heavily on his family to govern his empire. Princes were sometimes appointed as governors, such as Naram-Sin’s sons stationed in Marad, Tuttul, and Kazallu. Princesses were often consecrated as priestesses of the great temples of southern Mesopotamia: Enheduanna, daughter of Sargon (known for the poems attributed to her), in the temple of Nanna at Ur, Enmenanna, daughter of Naram-Sin, in the same temple, and her sister Tuta-napshum, high priestess of Enlil at Nippur.

The king governed surrounded by his loyal followers, an elite group that the inscription on the obelisk of Manishtusu refers to as the “sons of Akkad” (mār Akkade), a term that does not refer to their language or geographical origin. These high-ranking officials are associated not only with the exercise of power but also with the appropriation of resources from conquered lands. In particular, they receive estates taken from provincial agricultural lands, from which they are expected to draw the resources necessary to perform their duties. This serves as both a reward and an income. Administrative tablets identify several of them as holders of estate. The majordomo Yetib-Mer, for example, held lands in several provinces of the kingdom, including several thousand hectares in the two wealthy southern provinces of Umma and Lagash. This only reinforces these various figures’ dependence on the king and, with it, their loyalty. They lack a local power base, their estates are scattered across multiple locations, and they owe their success solely to the king or his family—that is, to personal connections. On their seals, they identify themselves first and foremost as “servants” of the king, the queen, a prince, or a princess, and they consecrate statues to the gods so that they may bestow their favors upon their royal masters.

Over time, this elite appears to have developed its own culture, a new way of life characteristic of the Akkadian state, drawing on the wealth accumulated through the empire’s exploitation. According to B. Foster, this is evident in their high-quality clothing, the use of cosmetics and jewelry, their participation in banquets where top-quality beer and wine were consumed, as well as their education. The qualities expected of elite men were physical strength and a strong character, while elite women were expected to be devoted to their families.

=== Akkadians and Sumerians ===
Southern Mesopotamia can be divided into two major regions that would later come to be known as Sumer and Akkad. The former, located in the south, was inhabited primarily by Sumerian speakers. The latter, situated in the north, was inhabited mainly by speakers of a Semitic language, Akkadian. While each region possessed its own distinct cultural characteristics, they coexisted for centuries and shared many cultural traits. The 'Akkadians' of this era were deeply influenced by "Sumerian" culture and, in any case, did not constitute an ethnic group in the modern sense of a people; rather, they were a collection of "people who had adopted the values, culture, loyalty, and way of life characteristic of the ruling elite of their time." Other peoples also lived in or alongside these regions such as the Elamites, Hurrians, and Gutians.

It has sometimes been attempted to view the revolts that swept through southern Mesopotamia as uprisings for Sumerian independence from Akkad. But the rebels originated from both Sumer and Akkad. These uprisings were first and foremost motivated by a desire to rid themselves of Akkadian control, which was resented by many, a resentment exacerbated by the centralizing tendencies, land confiscation, and the authoritarianism of the Akkadian kings. According to A. Westenholz, disapproval was nonetheless greater among the southern populations than among those in the north, judging by the fact that the southern cities resisted for longer. But it remains difficult to determine whether there was indeed an 'ethnic' opposition at this time between 'Sumerian' and 'Akkadian' elements, especially since in this particular case the revolt concerned the cities of both groups, albeit separately.

Nevertheless, the establishment of Akkadian domination was that of a predominantly Semitic population (heir to the so-called 'Kish tradition'). It had scribal traditions quite different from those of the Sumerian countries, which spread, along with administrative and legal practices, under the Akkadian kings. Akkadian became the preferred language for royal inscriptions and administration, without, however, eclipsing Sumerian. But there was apparently no obligation to write in Akkadian, since some important documents are in Sumerian, or bilingual in Akkadian and Sumerian. The Akkadian elite seems to have had no difficulty practicing bilingualism.

=== Provinces and estates ===
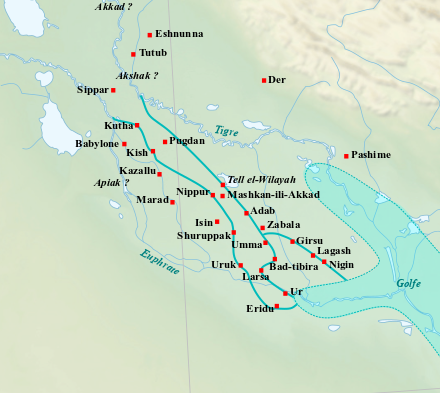
The main cities of southern Mesopotamia during the Akkadian period, with the approximate course of the rivers and the ancient shoreline of the Gulf.

From a territorial perspective, the Akkadian Empire can be divided into two parts: a 'center,' southern Mesopotamia (or Lower Mesopotamia), and a 'periphery,' in the neighboring regions. These two areas were administered differently.

The Akkadian dynasty is the first known attempt at a lasting unification of southern Mesopotamia. The impact of Akkadian rule is felt most strongly in this region. The administrative structures of the Akkadian state, however, are poorly documented and little understood. After Sargon’s conquest of Lower Mesopotamia, the former kingdoms that had divided the region among themselves were transformed into provinces, placed under the control of governors (ensi), and a portion of their resources, particularly their landholdings, was seized by the new regime and redistributed to its loyalists.

In the north (the land of Akkad), provinces and estates were often entrusted directly to members of the royal family. Geographical proximity to the capital strengthened ties with the central government. The situation in the southern provinces (Sumer) was different: governors were often of local origin and seem to have greater autonomy than those in the north, even though they were subject to the king’s orders, required to supply laborers, and had to pay taxes to the central government. Akkadian control over the southern provinces was also reflected in the creation of autonomous administrative centers, led by the king’s loyalists in accordance with the Akkadian administrative practices. It was a deliberate effort to isolate them from the rest of the provincial administration in order to weaken local structures and strengthen the influence of the central government, which also appears to have used them to support the garrisons it maintained there. These estates were established through the confiscation of land as early as previous reigns, but they are primarily documented from the reign of Naram-Sin onward and likely after the 'Great Revolt.'

Kings of Akkad also strengthened their control over the sanctuaries and, through them, their relationships with the major gods. This was achieved in particular by appointing several princesses and princes to the offices of high priestess/priest of major sanctuaries; the best-known example is that of Enheduanna, daughter of Sargon, made high priestess of the moon god Nanna in Ur. The temples possessed extensive estates, primarily in the region of Sumer and in the Diyala, despite their (relative) decline in comparison to royal estates. This is attested in particular by the archives of the Ekur of Nippur, the temple of the great god Enlil. This sanctuary also served a 'social welfare' role for isolated and destitute individuals (orphans, widows) whom it supported.

Laborers at these large institutions were either dependents or independent workers recruited on an occasional basis for specific tasks and paid in rations. More rarely, they were slaves, who did not constitute a significant part of the labor force.

The archives from this period also contain documents concerning local activities: trade in agricultural products, the buying and selling of fields and slaves, as well as loan agreements. The wealth of the notability engaged in these activities appears to have been linked to central authority. For example, in Umma, a man named Ur-Shara was in charge of livestock belonging to the palace. His wife, Ama-é, was a businesswoman who leased land from the palace and engaged in other private activities, especially loans.

=== Administrative Standards ===
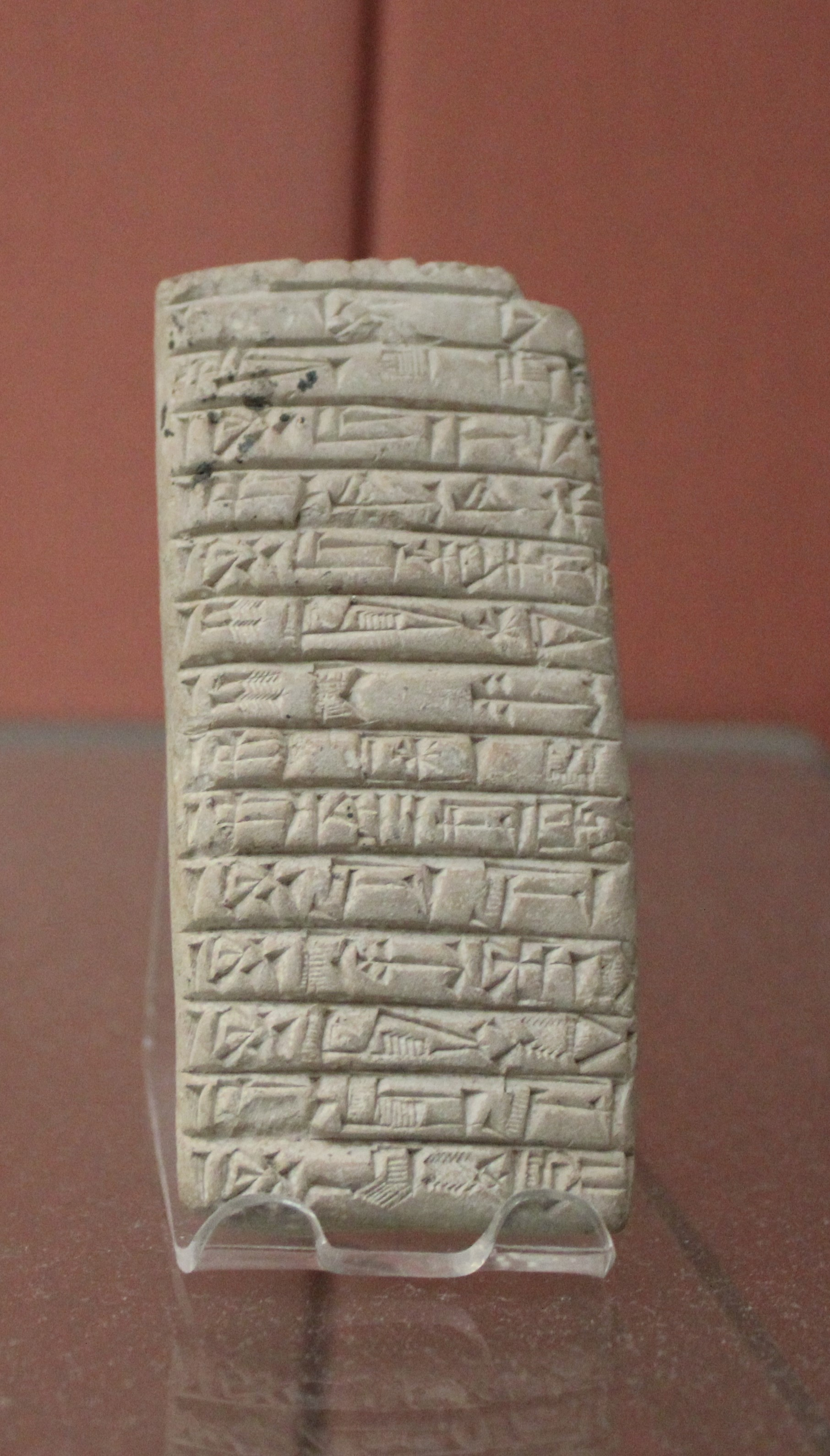
A tablet from the Akkadian archives of Girsu, illustrating reforms in writing: neat script and vertical lines on a rectangular tablet. British Museum.

The kings of Akkad gradually implemented a program aimed at administratively integrating the territories they had conquered into a new type of political structure. The archives from the reigns of Naram-Sin and Shar-Kali-Sharri show the spread of administrative practices, which can be found throughout the empire to varying degrees and clearly resulted from reforms and a desire for centralization.

This is reflected, in particular, in the use of 'Akkadian' units of measurement: a unit of volume called the kor or gur of Akkad (approximately 300 liters), serves as the standard in this system. It is used to measure the quantities of grain delivered to the royal administration and stored in its warehouses, which involves converting measurements from local systems that are often used to quantify the grain harvested in the fields. This drive toward standardization is also evident in weights and liquids, as well as in the ratios used to manage estates (for example, to estimate the area that a standard team of laborers could cultivate). Local institutions could continue their traditional practices for internal record-keeping, particularly in Sumerian regions, but they were required to conform to Akkadian practices when dealing with the royal administration. Akkadian administrative practices also involved using the Akkadian calendar.

The will to reform administrative practices is also evident in cuneiform writing, which underwent standardization, at least at the upper and middle levels of the royal administration. Script was affected by the reform: royal administrative documents were written in a style where the signs were more widely spaced and more carefully executed, particularly when produced by scribes serving a high-ranking official. The corpus of signs used also underwent changes. Some scribes adopted these new practices and consequently changed their writing style, likely as a means of gaining entry into more prestigious offices and thus advancing within the royal administration. Sealing practices were also affected by those changes.

=== Relations with the Periphery and the Wider World ===
Location of foreign lands for the Mesopotamians, including Elam, Magan, Dilmun, Marhashi and Meluhha.

The 'peripheral' regions are politically and demographically diverse and often distant from the center, which complicates control over them. Akkadian domination in these regions was sporadic and uneven: the Akkadian presence was very limited or even nonexistent during the first three reigns; it took shape primarily under Naram-Sin and relied on a network of Akkadian garrisons stationed at strategic locations (Susa, Tell Brak, Gasur) in order to control the major trade routes. The fact that Akkadian control manifested itself primarily through the occupation of places along these communication routes suggests that these ventures were also (and above all?) intended to control trade routes for goods prized by the empire’s elites, while leaving vast portions of territory outside their control.

Often, the rulers of Akkad seem to have favored diplomatic agreements with neighboring kingdoms, including by matrimonial alliances. For example, a tablet found in Susa records a peace agreement between Naram-Sin and a king of Awan, in what is now southwestern Iran and written in Elamite. The latter becomes a vassal of the former, obligating him to follow his political line, not to betray him, and to provide military assistance if necessary. In this same city, Akkadian rule is documented by Akkadian-style cuneiform tablets, and the material culture appears to reflect a greater influence from Lower Mesopotamia A stele unearthed at Tell Abu Sheeja in Iraq, near the Iraqi border, depicts a certain Ilu-rabi from the land of Pashime, within the Elamite sphere of influence, identified by a cuneiform inscription from the Akkadian period, which clearly corresponds to the person of the same name, governor of Pashime, mentioned on the Manishtushu obelisk.

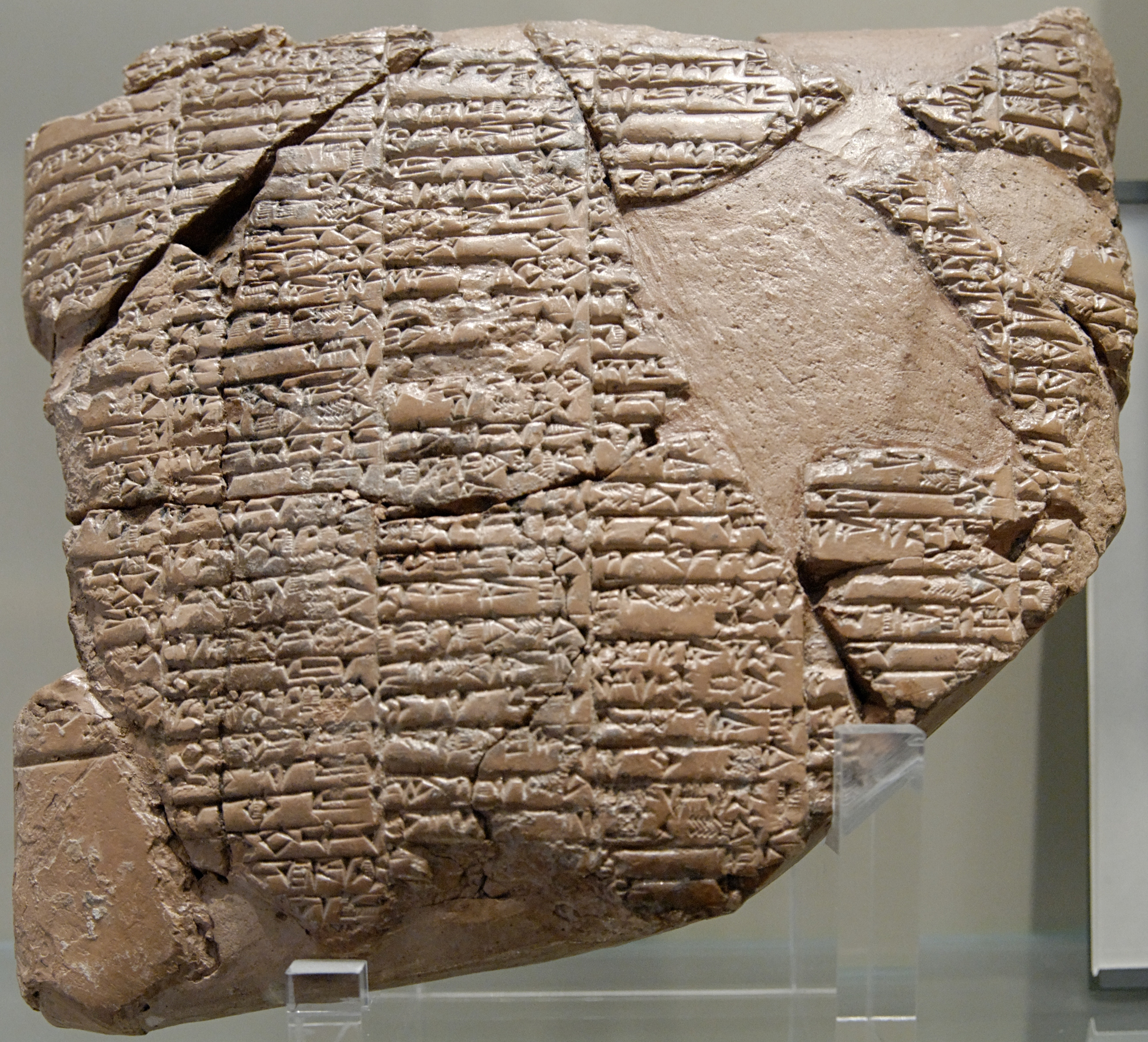
Alliance treaty between Naram-Sin and a king of Awan, c. 2250, Susa, Louvre Museum.

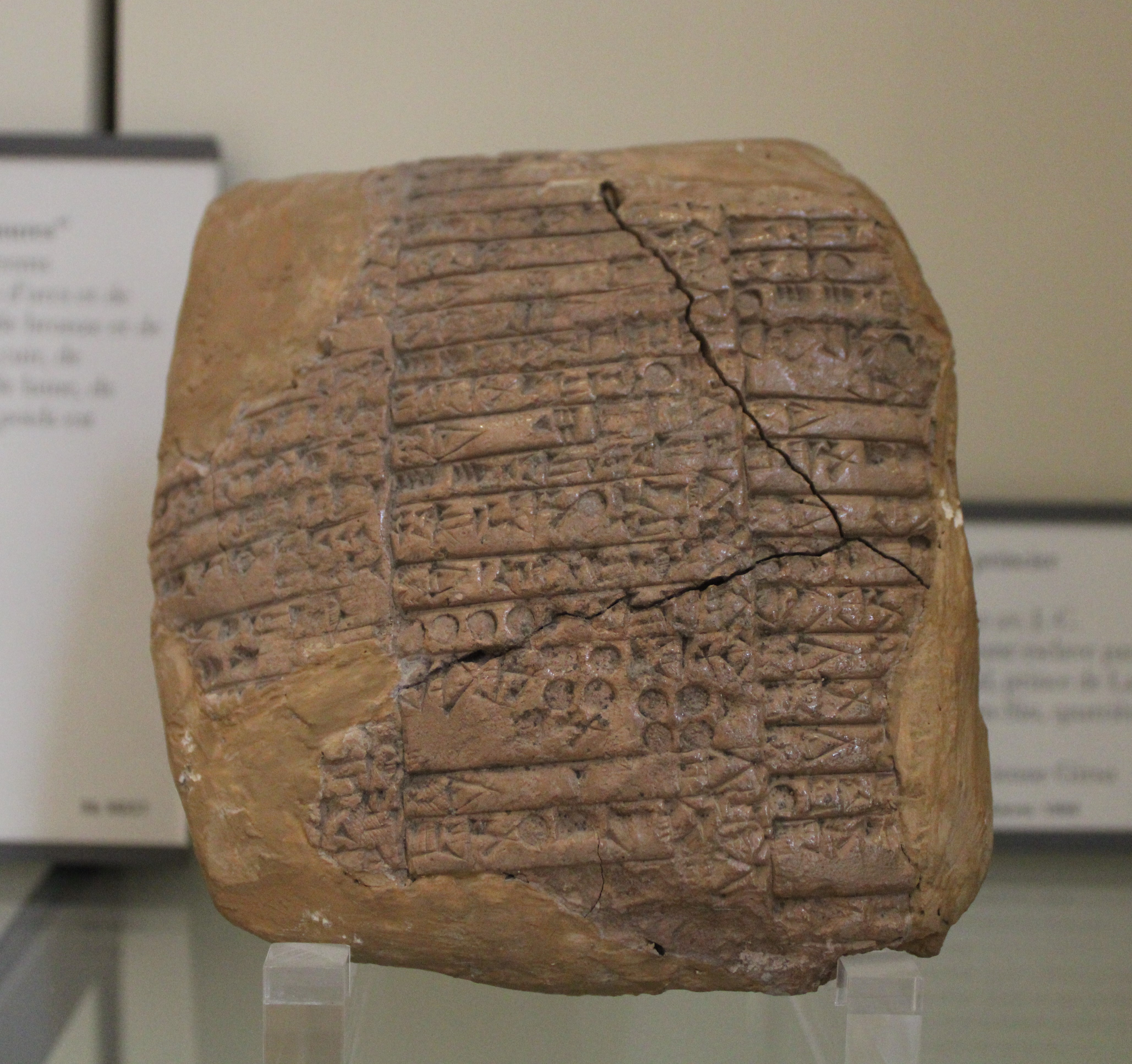
Administrative tablet recording deliveries of military equipment (bows, arrows, quivers, spears, helmets) to stewards. Susa, Louvre Museum.

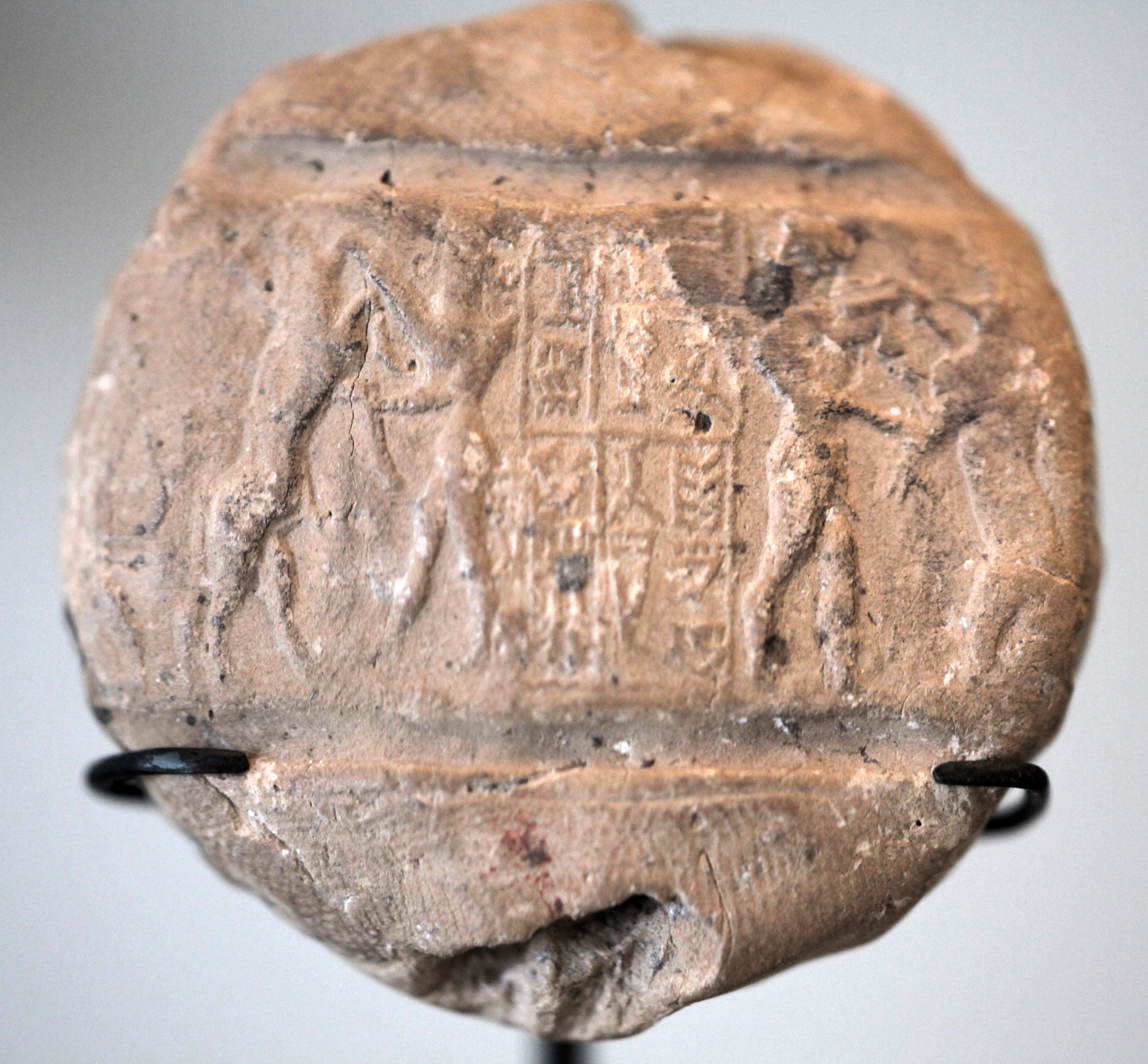
Impression of the cylinder seal of Liburbeli, cupbearer to Epirmupi, governor of Susa and Elam, likely during the reign of Shar-kali-sharri. Louvre Museum.

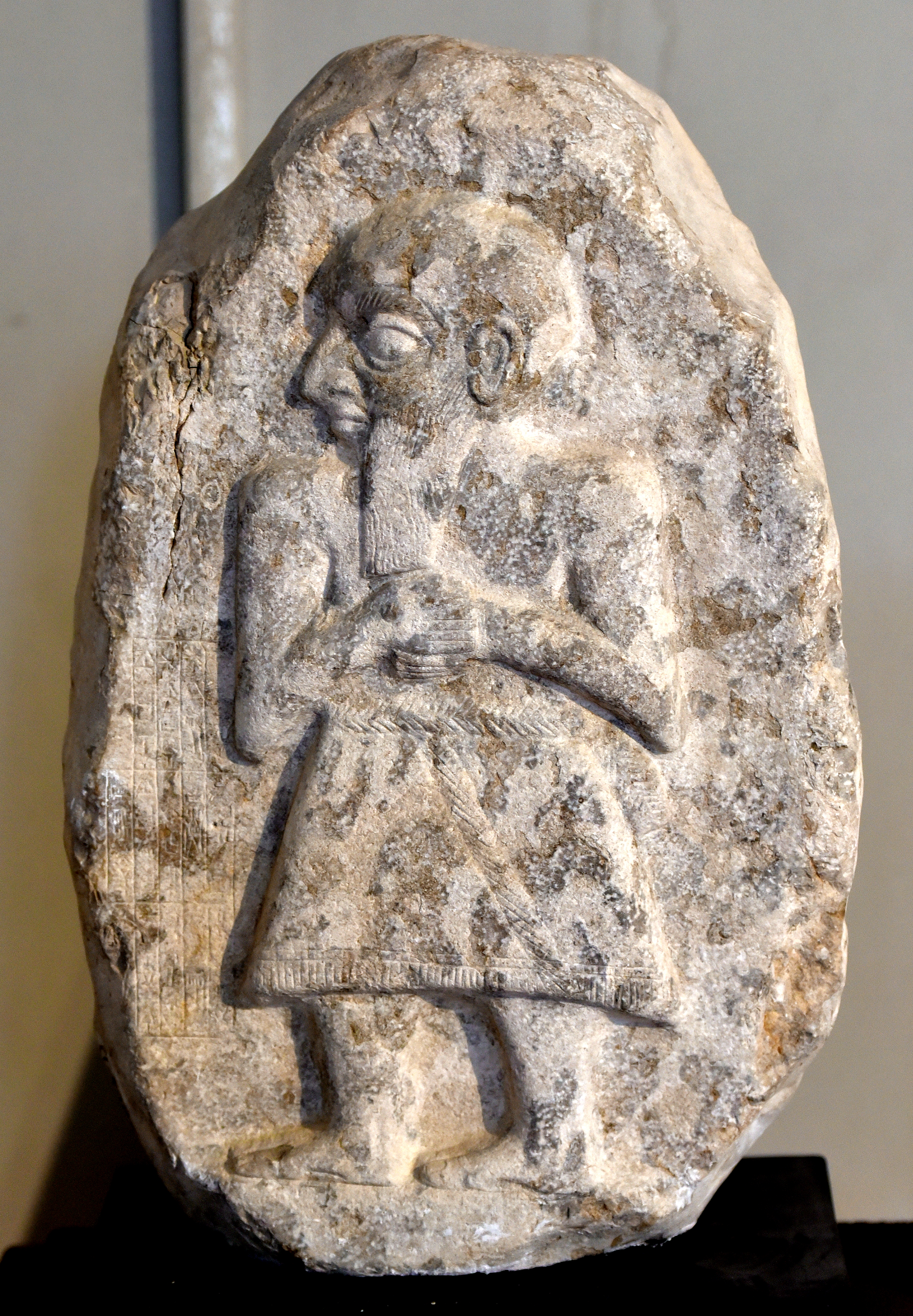
Stele of Ilshu-rabi of Pashime. National Museum of Iraq.

Archaeology provides evidence to Akkadian rule in Upper Syrian Mesopotamia. The most significant traces of Akkadian occupation have been found at Tell Brak, where a large building was excavated bearing foundation inscriptions in the name of Naram-Sin; it likely served as the residence of a local governor and was surrounded by other structures from the same period, indicating that the city was redeveloped after its conquest. Other buildings from the Akkadian period and artifacts attesting to occupation by this empire—or at least to diplomatic relations with it—have been found in the same region at Tell Leilan, Tell Beydar, Tell Mozan, Mari, and Tell Munbaqa. Thus at Mozan, ancient Urkesh, seals bearing the name of a daughter of Naram-Sin seems to indicate that she had been married to the local Hurrian king.

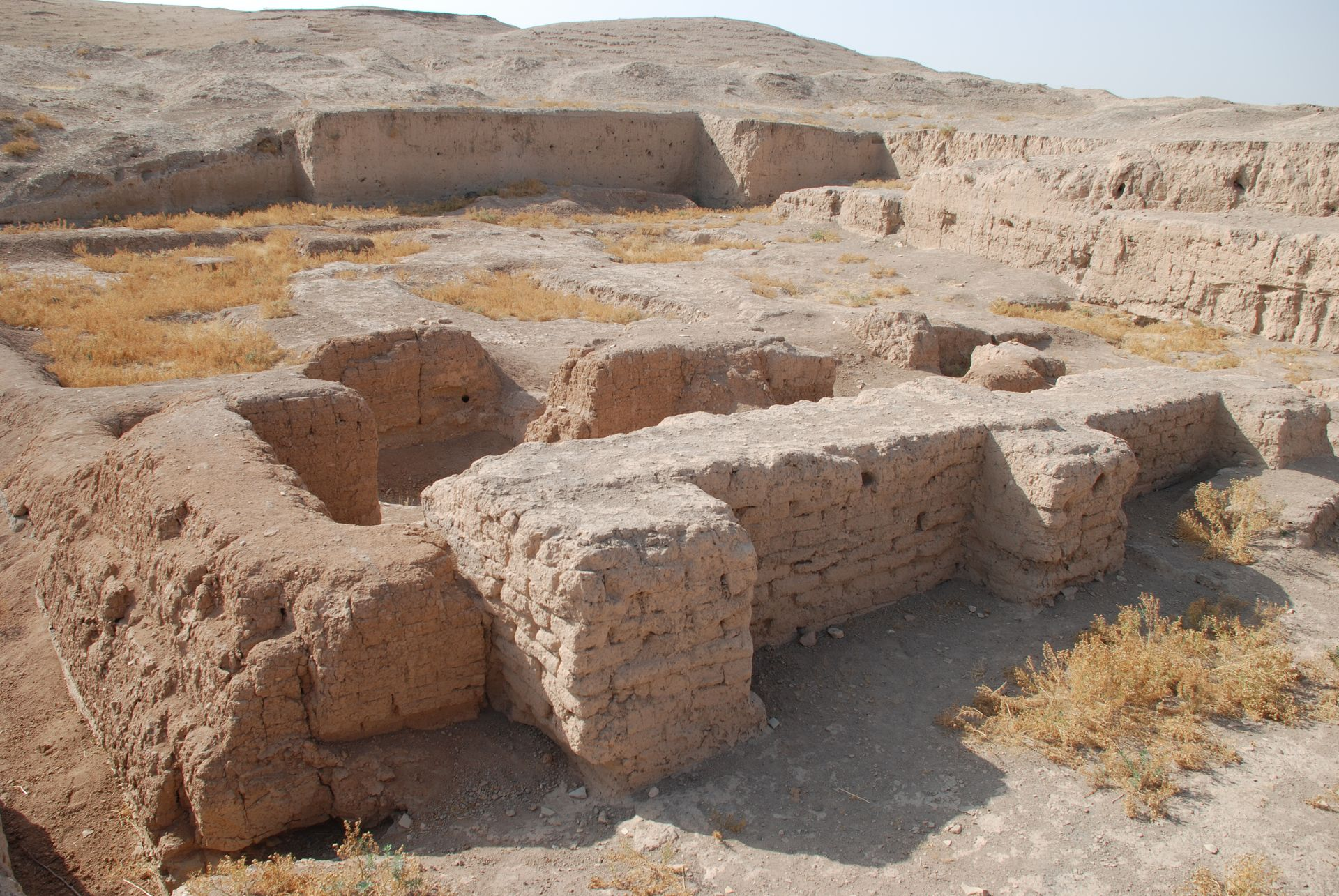
Ruins of a structure dating to the reign of Naram-Sin at Tell Brak in Syria.

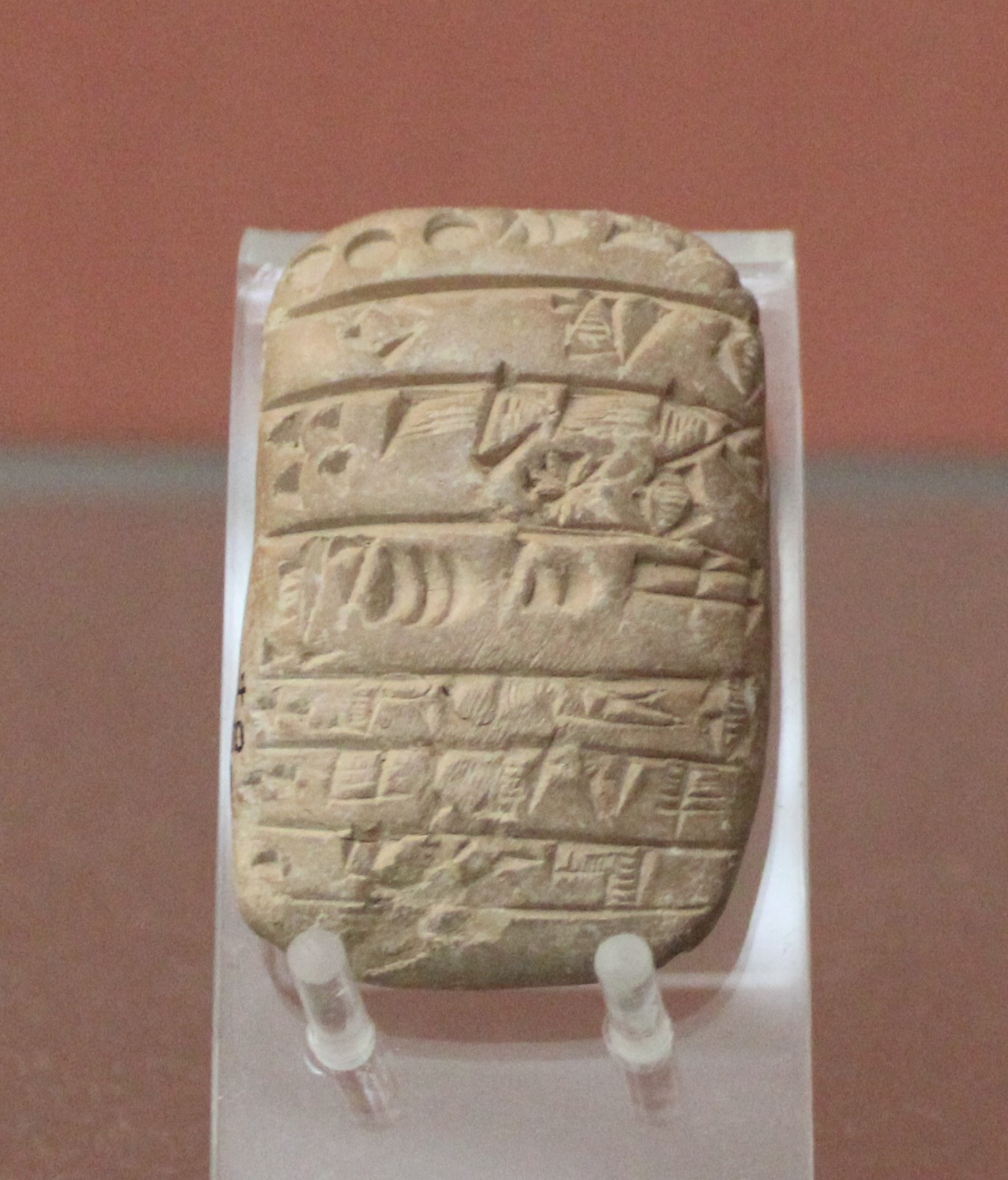
Akkadian administrative tablet from Tell Brak: list of laborers. British Museum.

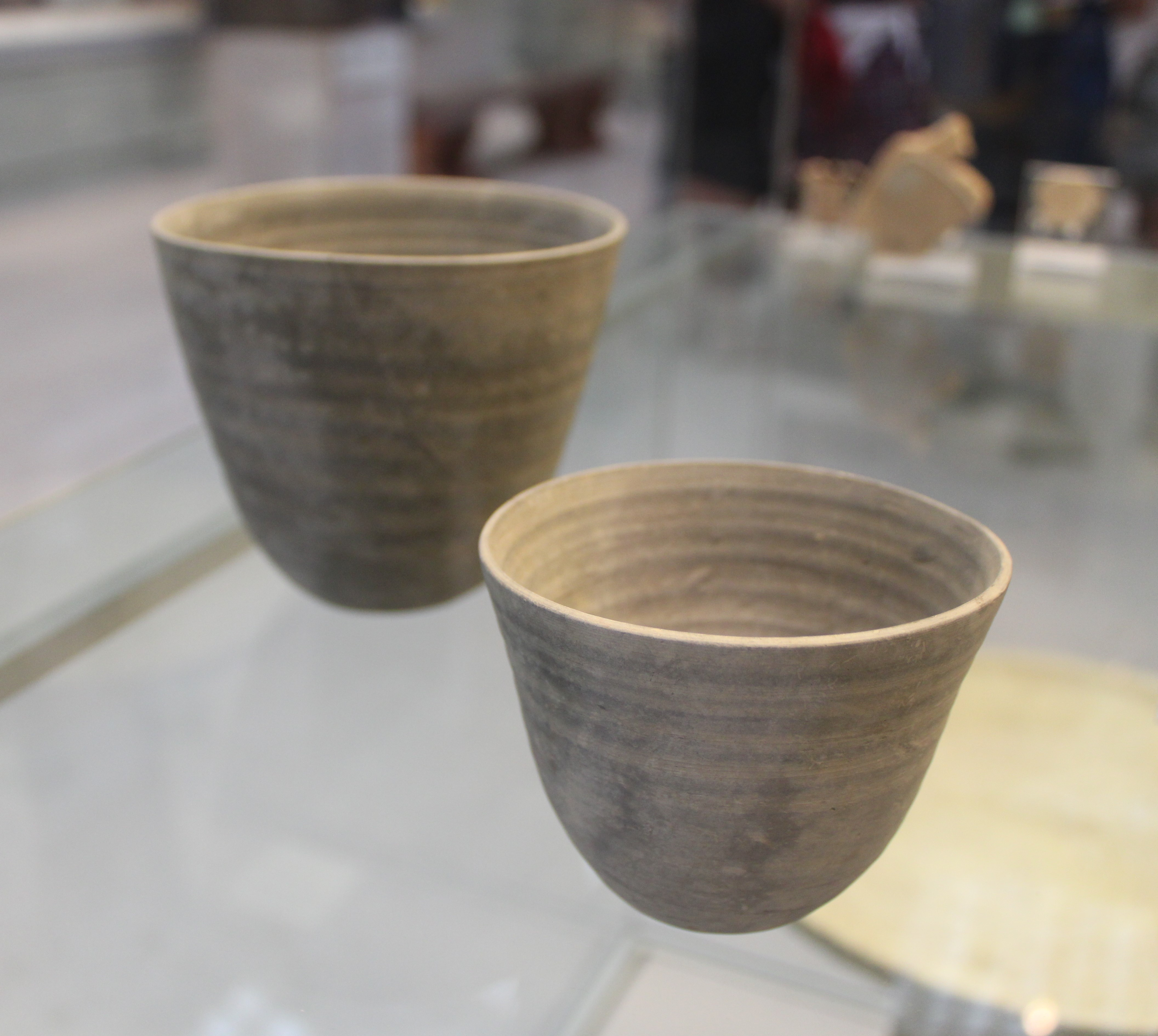
Pair of cups, in stoneware, luxury ware used by the elite of the Akkadian Empire. Tell Brak, British Museum.

For the eastern part of Upper Mesopotamia, evidence of Akkadian rule comes primarily from the tablets of Yorghan Tepe, then known as Gasur (later Nuzi). These are the archives of an estate managed by an administrator named Zuzu, possibly a subordinate of a member of the Akkadian royal family, regarding distribution of land in exchange for services from palace dependents or tenants, as well as the distribution of rations to laborers.

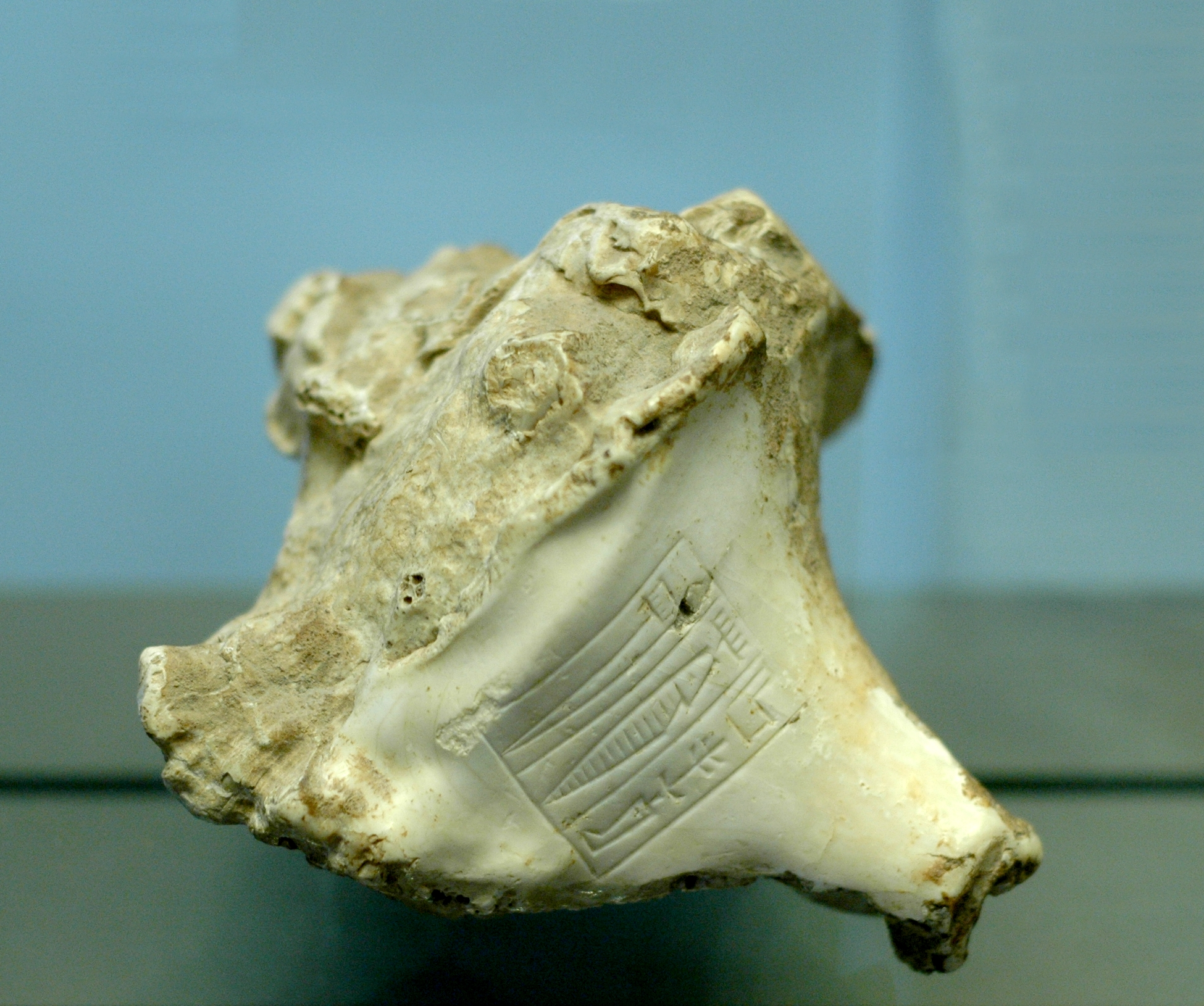
Sea shell of a murex bearing the name of Rimush, king of Kish, c. 2270 BC, Louvre, traded from the Mediterranean coast where it was used by Canaanites to make a purple dye.

International trade developed during the Akkadian period. It was very active toward the Iranian Plateau, as well as the Persian Gulf, extending as far as Oman (Magan) and the Indus Valley (Meluhha), regions rich in raw materials for which the Mesopotamians had a high demand (metals, stones). Sargon was the first Mesopotamian ruler to make an explicit reference to the region of Meluhha, which is generally understood as being the Balochistan or the Indus area. However, it is not clear what they exported in return: likely grain, textiles, and perfumed oils.

"Sargon, the king of Kish, triumphed in thirty-four battles (over the cities) up to the edge of the sea (and) destroyed their walls. He made the ships from Meluhha, the ships from Magan (and) the ships from Dilmun tie up alongside the quay of Agade. Sargon the king prostrated himself before (the god) Dagan (and) made supplication to him; (and) he (Dagan) gave him the upper land, namely Mari, Yarmuti, (and) Ebla, up to the Cedar Forest (and) up to the Silver Mountain"

— Inscription by Sargon of Akkad (ca.2270–2215 BC)

== Culture and ideology ==
=== Exaltation of kingship ===
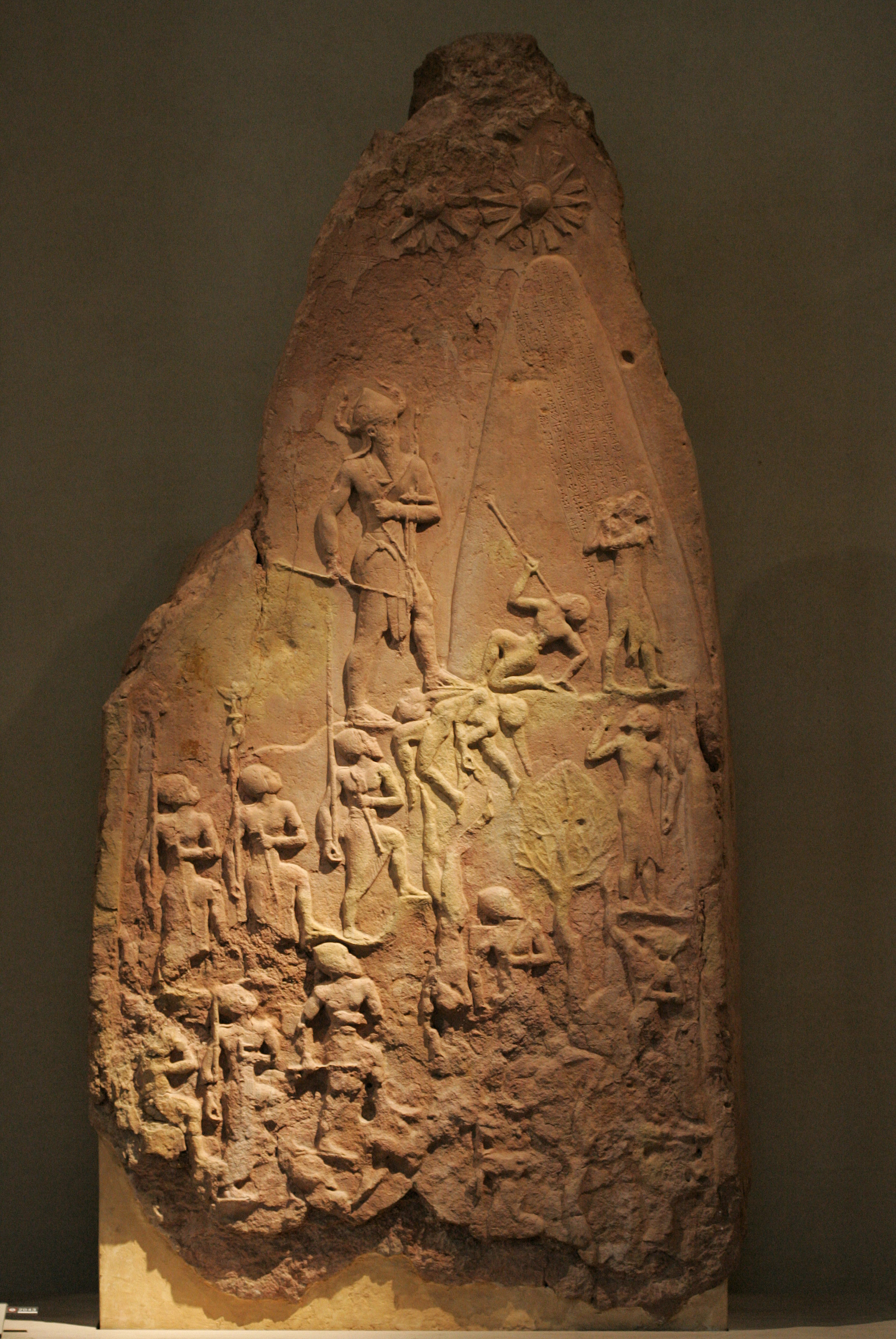
Victory Stele of Naram-Sin, celebrating victory against the Lullubi. Brought back from Sippar to Susa as war prize in the 12th century BC. Louvre Museum.

The establishment of a new type of monarchical power, centered on a heroic and conquering royal figure, gave rise to new artistic and literary expressions of royalty that served as propaganda and celebrated the monarchy and the supremacy of the victorious ruler, particularly emphasizing the figure of the warrior king. To this end, the forms of art and literature developed during the period of the Early dynasties were reshaped, giving rise, in particular, to a new style of royal art with innovative visual codes. It had a lasting influence on Mesopotamian art, particularly the visual expression of kingship.

In connection with this new imagery, the kings of Akkad also described their exploits (especially military ones) in increasingly lengthy inscriptions, written in elegant calligraphy, in Sumerian and, increasingly, in the Akkadian language, on stelae and statues depicting them. These inscribed monuments were distributed throughout the empire to demonstrate the universal nature of their rule, as well as to propagate their omnipotence and their worldview. "Text and image worked together to perpetuate and legitimize the centralized authority of the Akkadian order, whose ruler dominated the material realm and linked kingship to heaven.". These monuments were often placed in temples, not as votive offerings perpetually repeating the king’s prayer before the divine statue, as they were previously, but as symbols of his earthly authority and his special relationship with the gods.

=== Sculpture ===
Stone sculpture (particularly in diorite) and metal sculpture (using lost-wax casting) underwent significant development during the Akkadian period. The Akkadian dynasty developed its own visual identity, derived from the traditions of the Early dynasties, which is particularly evident in the carving of royal monuments, characterized by their size, their placement in public and sacred spaces, and also a more naturalistic style. Due to its artistic quality and, in particular, its attention to anatomical detail, the sculpture of this period is among the most realistic in Mesopotamian history. It foreshadows that of the Neo-Sumerian period, known for the statues of King Gudea of Lagash. But it is in the subject matter that the most profound changes occurred. The king became the central figure, replacing the deities.

This is particularly evident in royal portraits, such as the copper alloy head from Nineveh depicting a king (Manishtushu? Naram-Sin?). It is remarkable for the attention to detail typical of the period in the depiction of the king’s hair and beard. It embodies several of the characteristic features of the representation of the sovereign in Mesopotamian iconography since the 4th millennium BC: the headband, the long, finely combed beard, and the bun tied at the nape of the neck. Fragmentary diorite statues of Manishtushu, depicted him seated or standing, also illustrate the development of this art.

Stelae depicting the victorious king killing or capturing his enemies are known as early as the reign of Sargon and continued under his successors. The most remarkable is the Victory Stele of Naram-Sin, which commemorates this king’s victorious campaign against the Lullubi, a people of the Zagros region. It clearly depicts the exaltation of the god-king, wearing the horned tiara characteristic of the deity. Towering over his soldiers and the defeated enemies, he is the focal point of the composition. He directs his gaze toward astral symbols located at the top of the stele, evoking the divine presence; this vertical composition contrasts with traditional, horizontal representations. The depiction of the king is idealized, presenting the viewer with a body considered perfect, which exudes an impression of power and vigor.

Enheduanna’s alabaster disk, meanwhile, indicates that official art also focused on women of the royal family: Sargon’s daughter, priestess of Ur, she is depicted in a ritual scene.

The diorite obelisk of Manishtushu, on the other hand, is a monument that does not feature any pictorial representation but demonstrates the achievements of calligraphic art during this era.

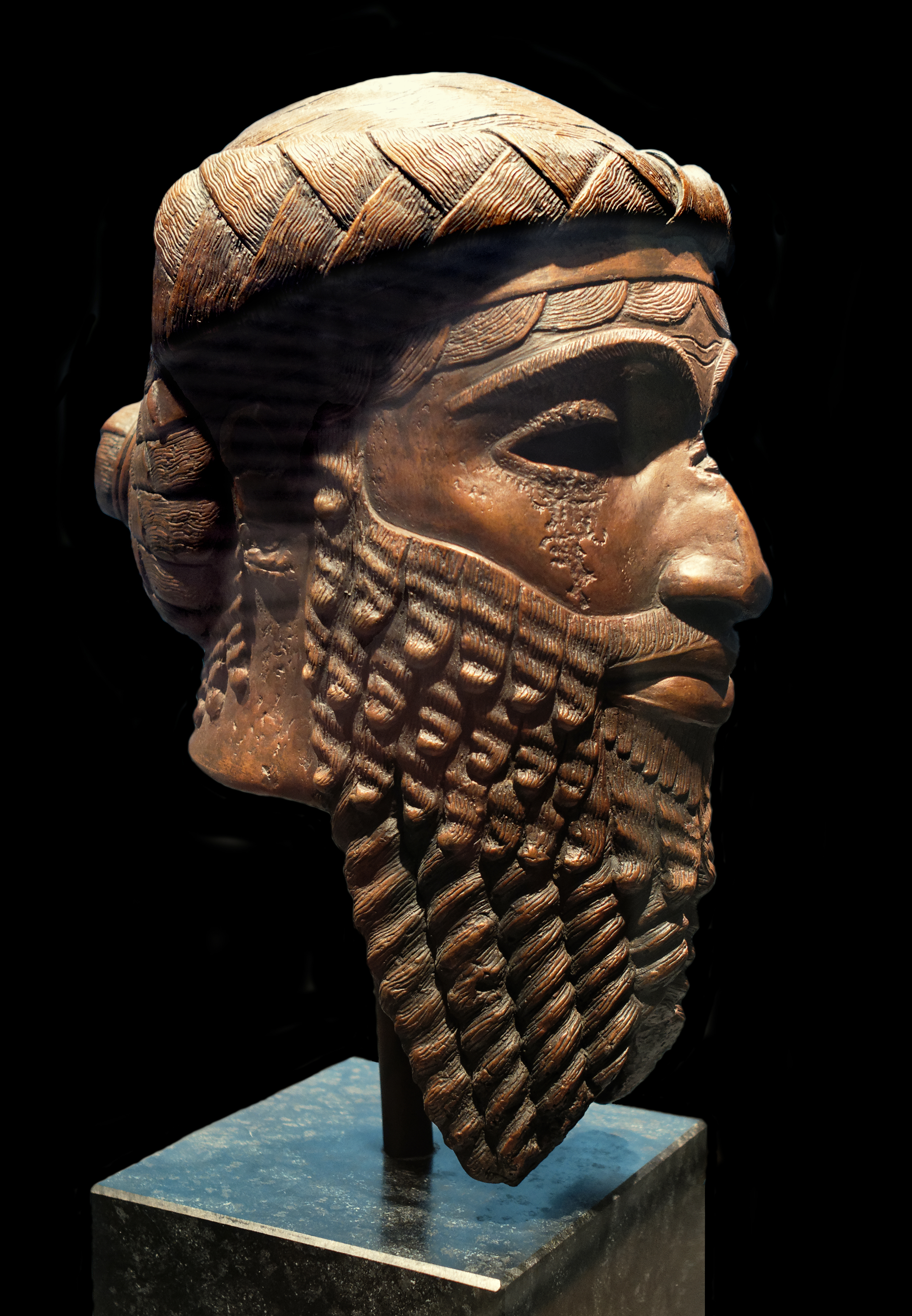
Copper alloy (or bronze) head of an Akkadian ruler, discovered in Nineveh in 1931 (copy).

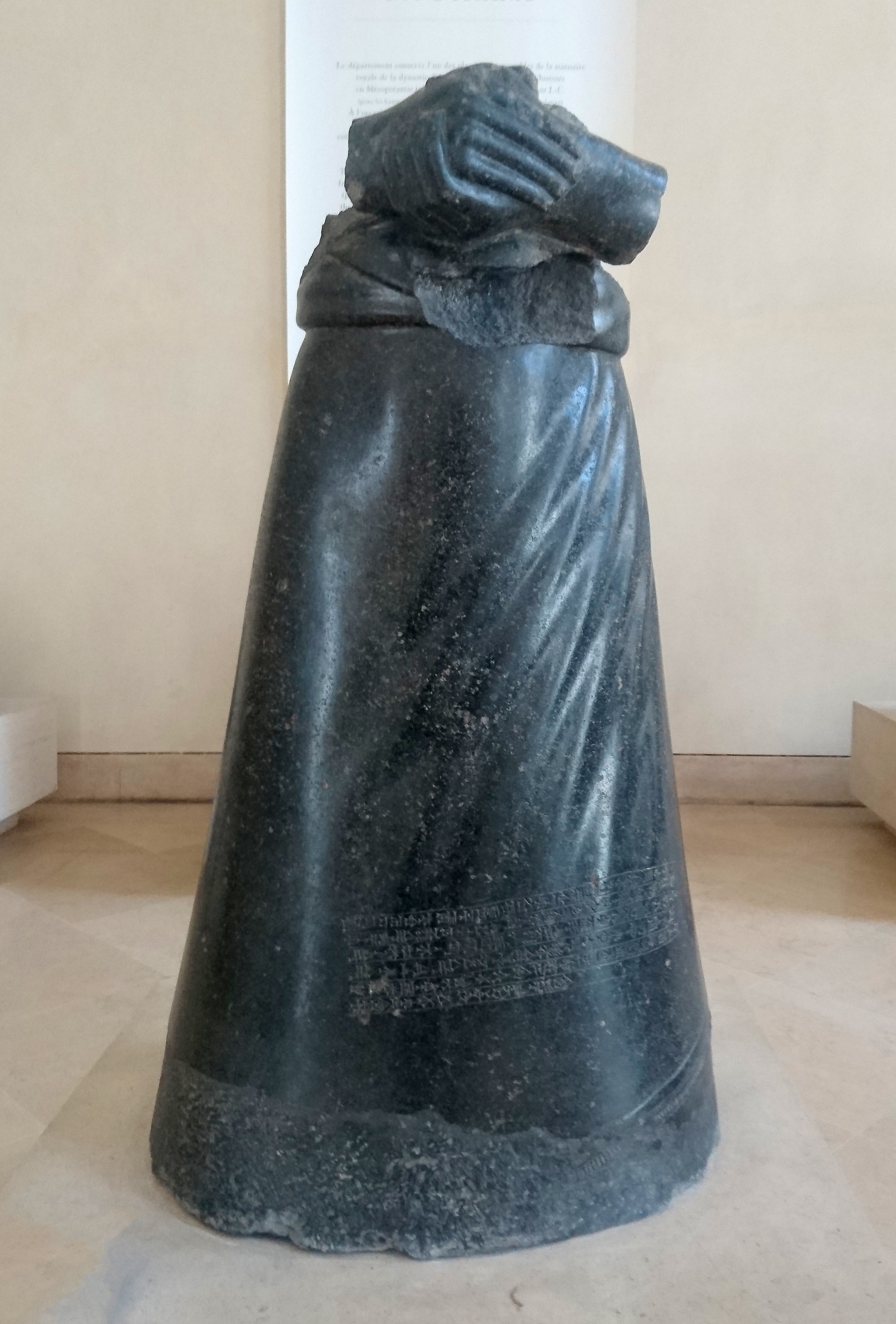
The Manishtushu statue. Louvre Museum.

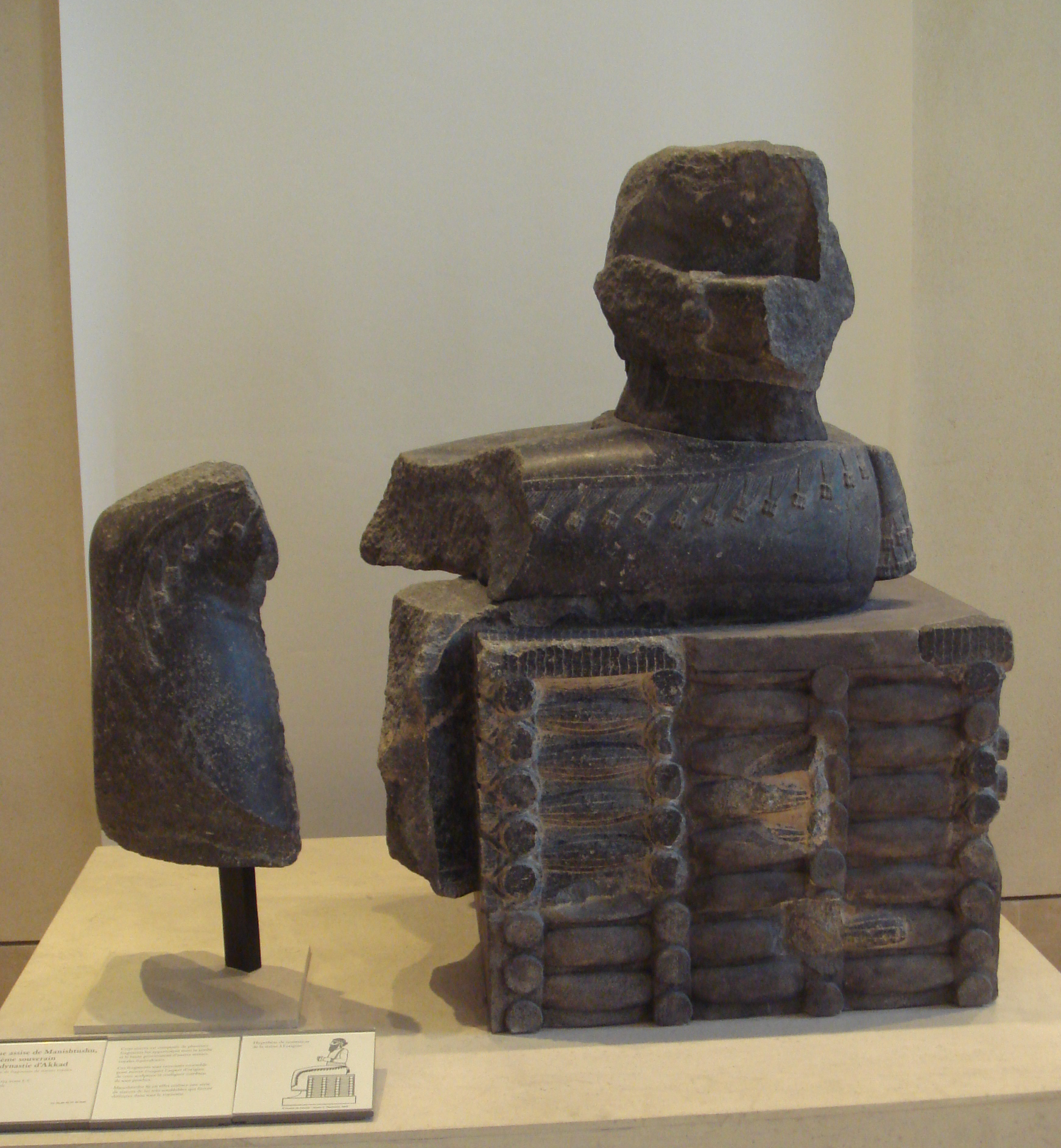
Throne of Manishtushu. Louvre Museum.

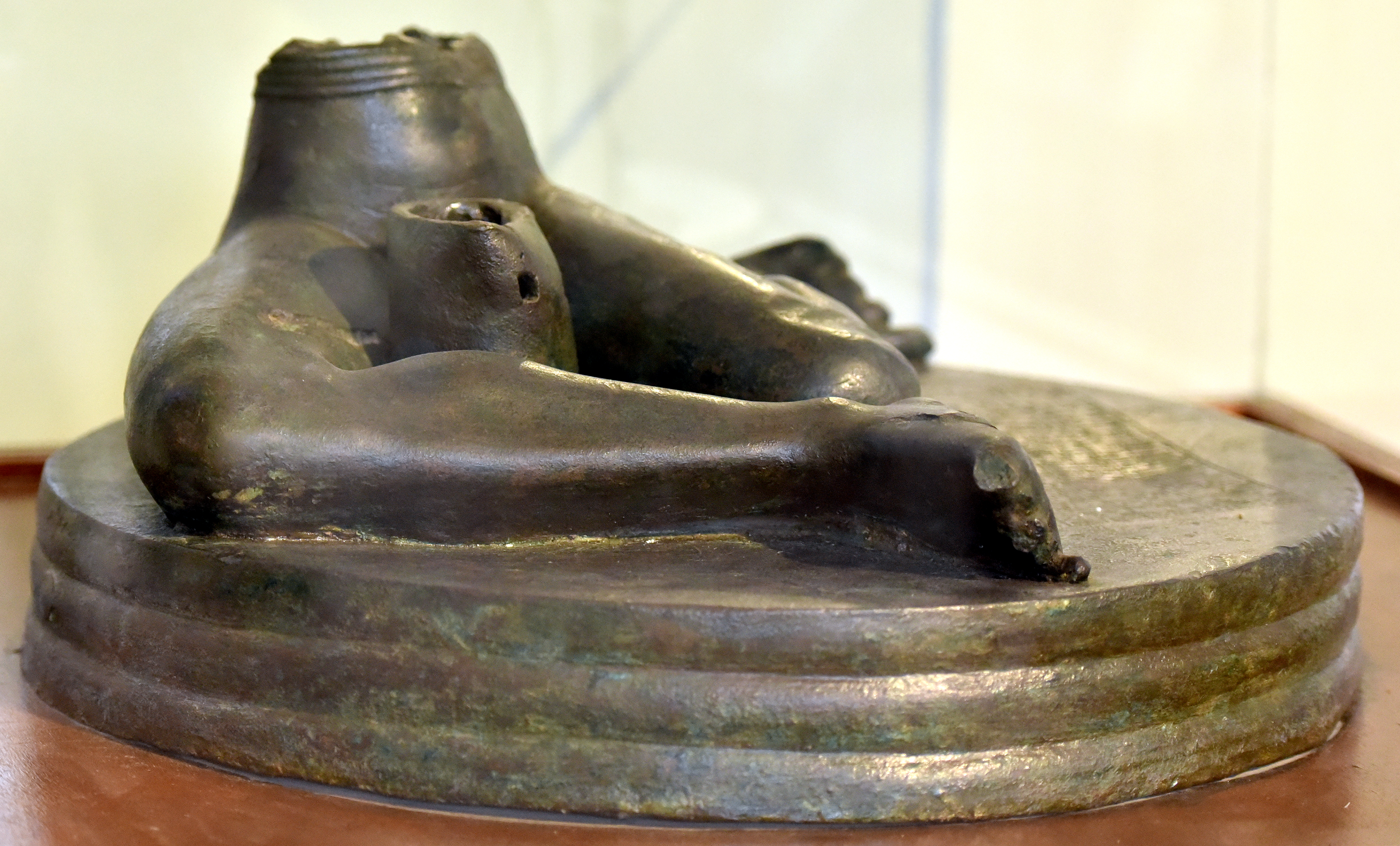
The Bassetki statue, reign of Naram-Sin, another example of Akkadian low wax technique.

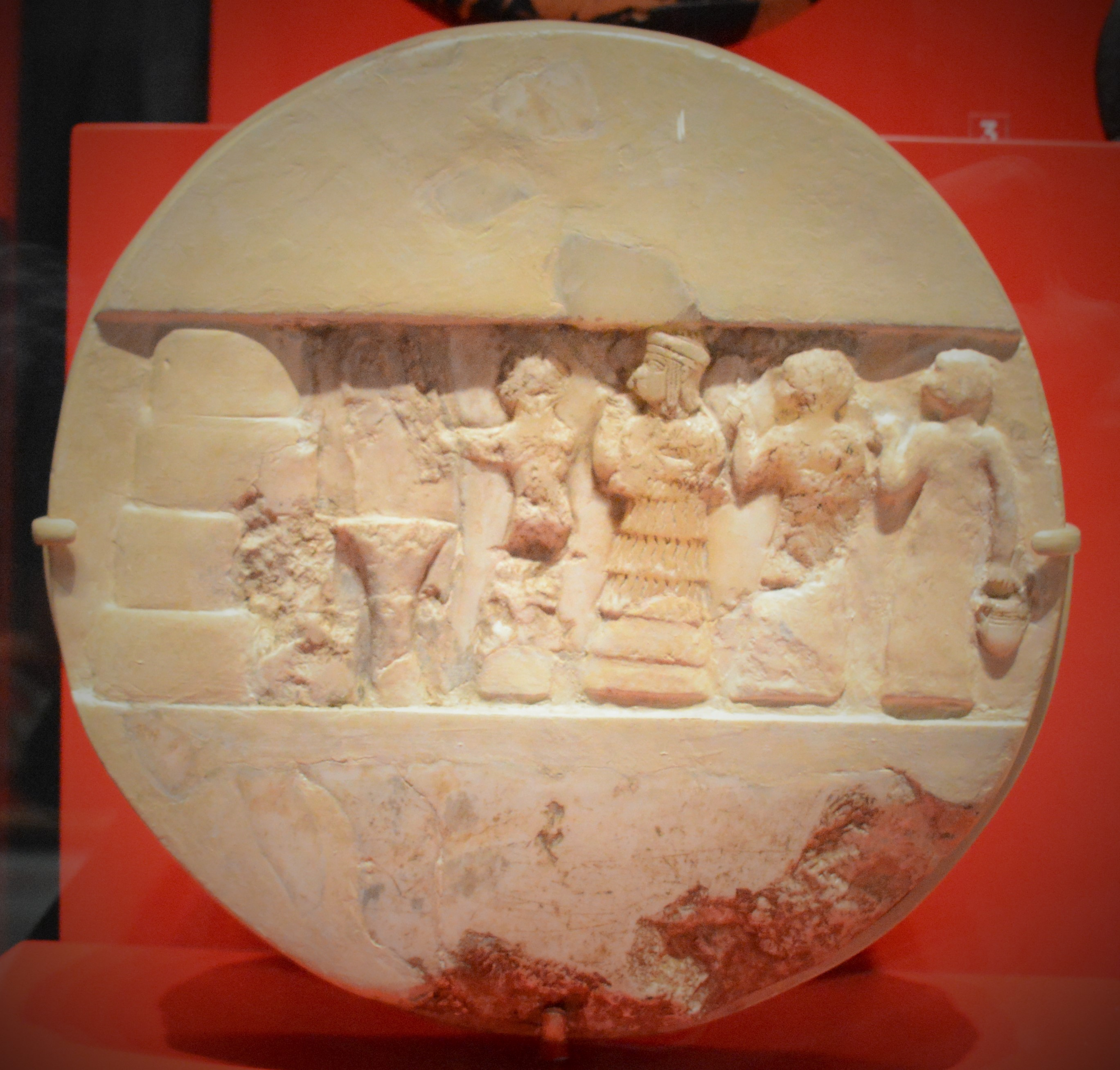
The Disk of Enheduanna (restored), showing the high priestess standing in worship as what has been interpreted as a male priest pours a libation.

=== Seals ===
The Akkadian period finally saw the development, in the field of glyptics, of a religious art form depicted on the cylinder seals of the kingdom’s important figures, very often carved from chlorite. The glorification of the monarchy is entirely absent from this type of medium, but the desire to standardize religious themes may have stemmed from the government and its centralizing tendencies. In any case, it is through these sources that we have the most information about religion during this period, given that inscriptions are rather scarce on this subject.

While this art draws inspiration from certain themes of earlier periods, it is also highly innovative and, in this regard as well, aims for greater detail and naturalism in the depiction of figures. Some scenes depict deities, with characteristic visual attributes: there appears to be an effort to distinguish them more clearly from one another than in the past. The most commonly depicted are: Enki/Ea, the god of wisdom and sweet waters, often accompanied by his vizier Ushmu, the two-faced god; the sun god Utu/Shamash; and the great goddess Inanna/Ishtar. A major theme is that of a battle featuring a hero or deity confronting a real or imaginary animal. One of the most remarkable seals of the period is that of Ibni-sharrum, scribe of Shar-Kali-Sharri: two nude figures named lahmu, watering two buffaloes, with the scene arranged symmetrically around the cartouche bearing the name and title of the seal’s owner

The end of this period also saw the emergence of a type of scene that would later become very popular, particularly among members of the royal administration: the presentation (or intercession) scene, in which a human is depicted before a deity, to whom he is sometimes introduced by another deity. This type of scene is clearly derived from banquet scenes, widespread during the era of the Early dynasties. The reasons for the transition from one to the other are discussed, and may be linked to the political changes of the Akkadian era..

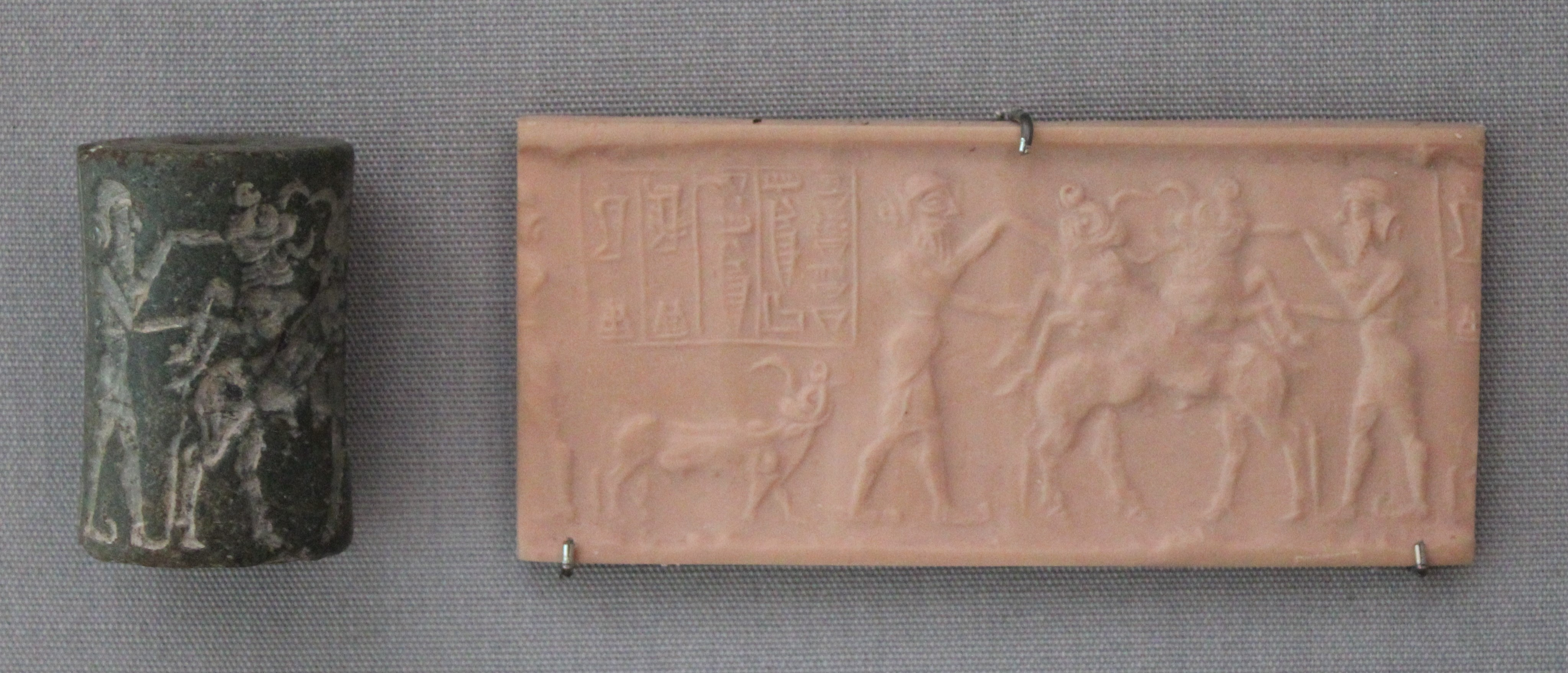
Cylinder seal of a servant of Bin-kali-sharri, son of Naram-Sin, featuring an impression depicting two heroes battling bulls. British Museum.

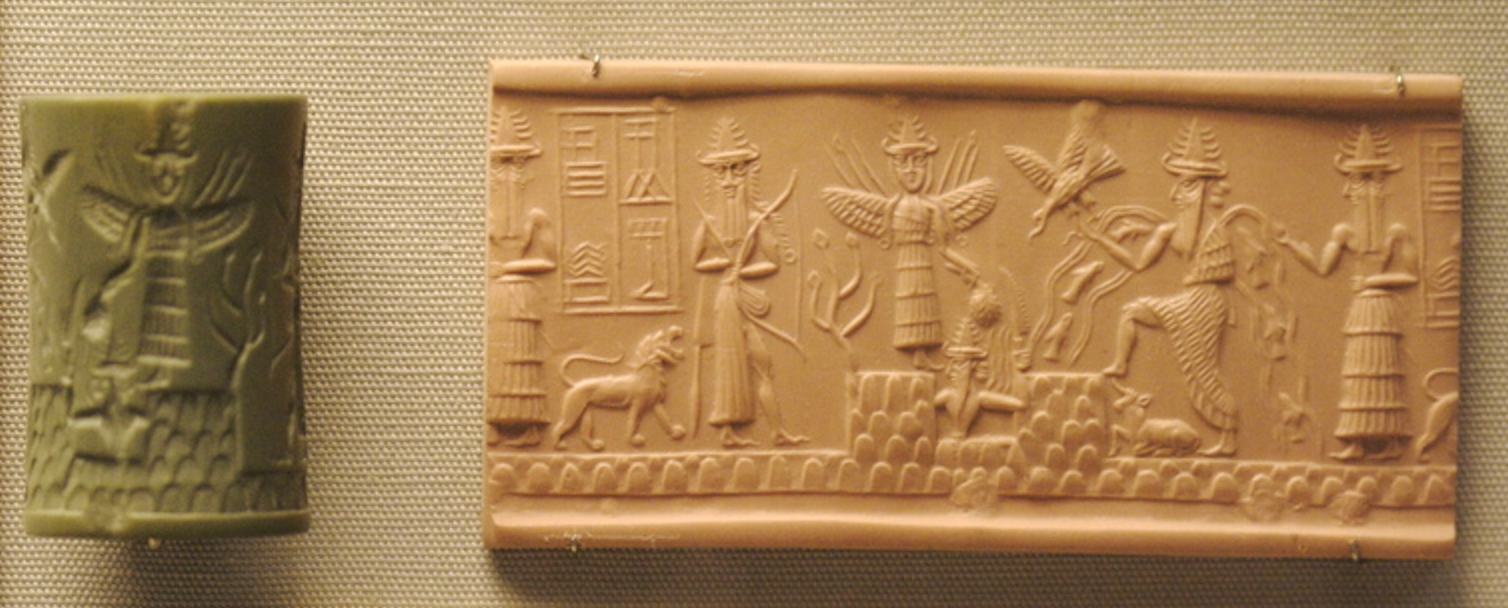
Inscription "Adda, the scribe", hunting god with bow and an arrow, Ishtar with weapons rising from her shoulders, emerging sun-god Shamash, Zu bird of destiny, water god Ea with bull between legs, two-faced attendant god Usimu with right hand raised.

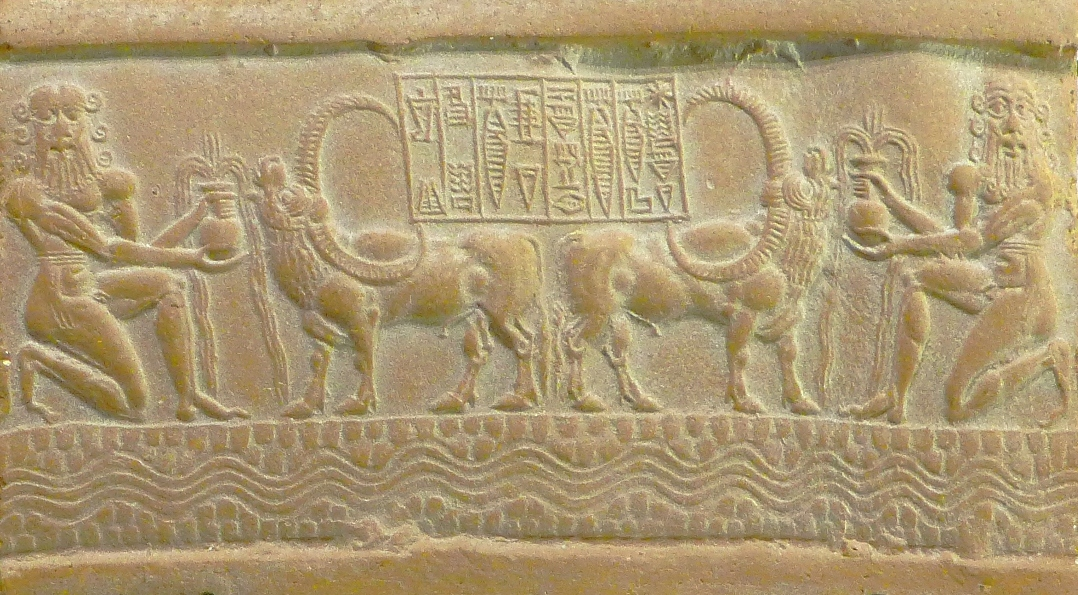
Impression of the cylinder seal of Ibni-sharrum, scribe of Shar-Kali-Sharri, a masterpiece of Akkadian seal engraving. Louvre Museum.

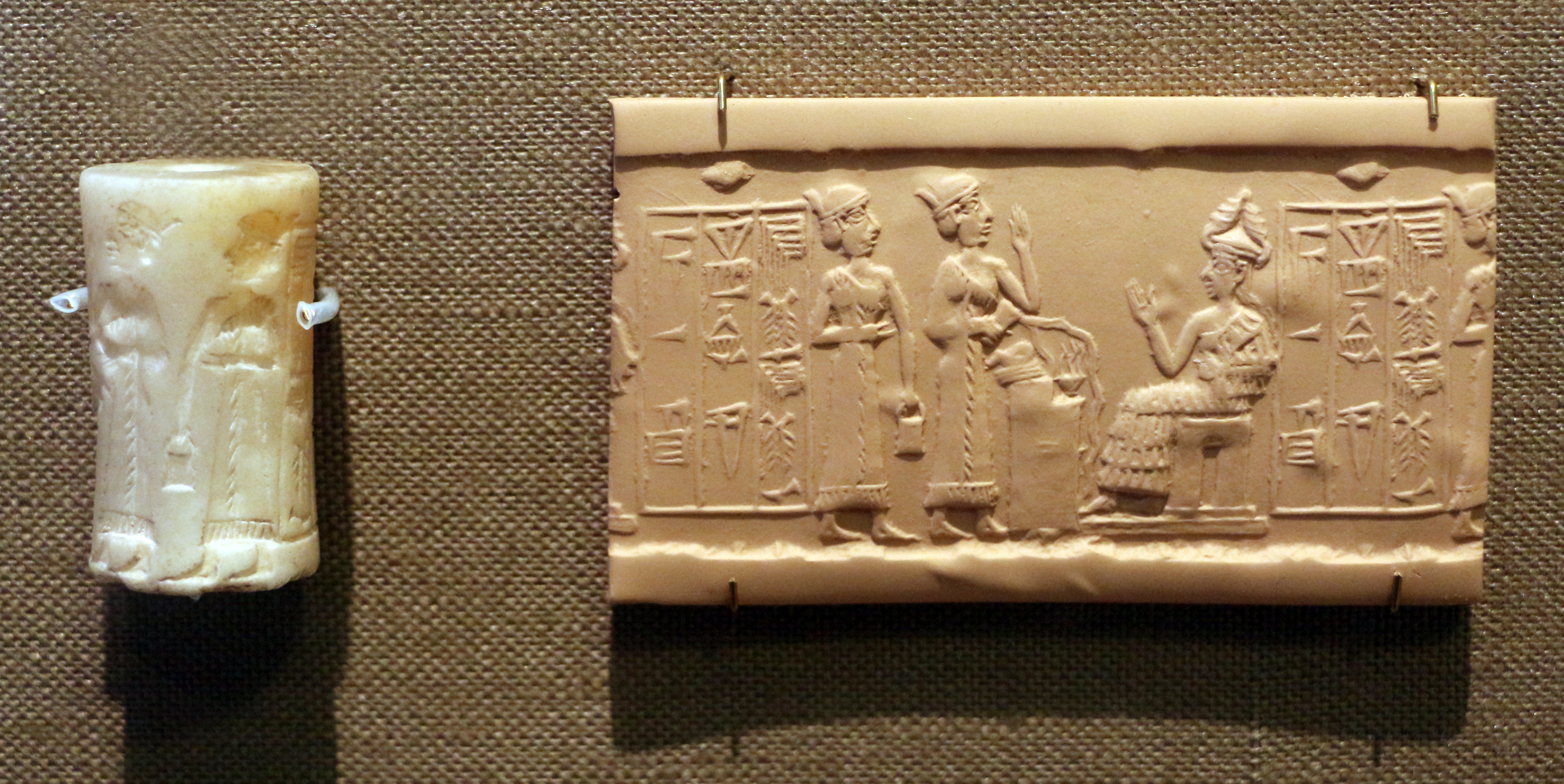
A cylinder seal depicting a scene in which a devotee is presented before a goddess. Oriental Institute, Chicago.

=== Gods of kingship ===
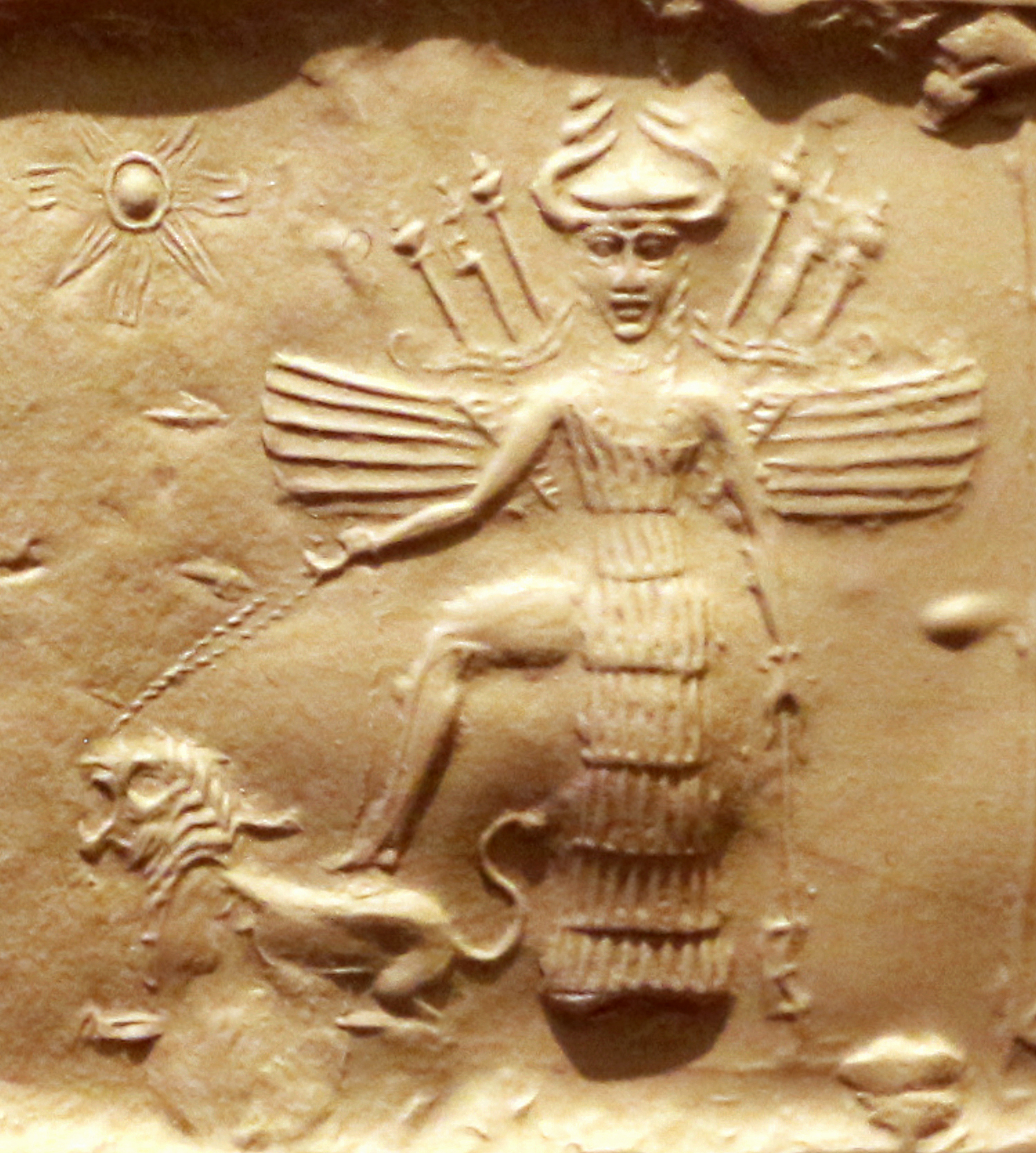
Goddess Ishtar on an Akkadian seal, 2350–2150 BC

In keeping with ancient Mesopotamian tradition, the ruler presented himself as the chosen one of the gods, seeking to fulfill their will. The great deity patronizing the Akkadian dynasty was Ishtar (Inanna to the Sumerian people), the goddess of love and war. She had a great temple in the kingdom’s capital, Akkad, in a place called Ulmash, where her warlike aspect seems to have been particularly emphasized; Naram-Sin mentions her in several of his inscriptions as Ištar Annunītum, which can be translated as “Ishtar of the Battle.” But the provider of kingship remains the great god Enlil, whose sanctuary is located in Nippur. Yet, shifts in royal religious ideology can be identified, beyond the deification of the king. The Akkadian period saw a reorganization of divine society: previously structured primarily around city-states, the pantheon began to coalesce into a unified system, a move that, once again, aimed to consolidate imperial unity through religious ideology. This may have been accompanied by a more extensive syncretism between the deities of the land of Sumer and those of the Semitic-speaking regions that would later be known as the land of Akkad, but this point remains controversial.

=== Enheduanna: the first poet? ===
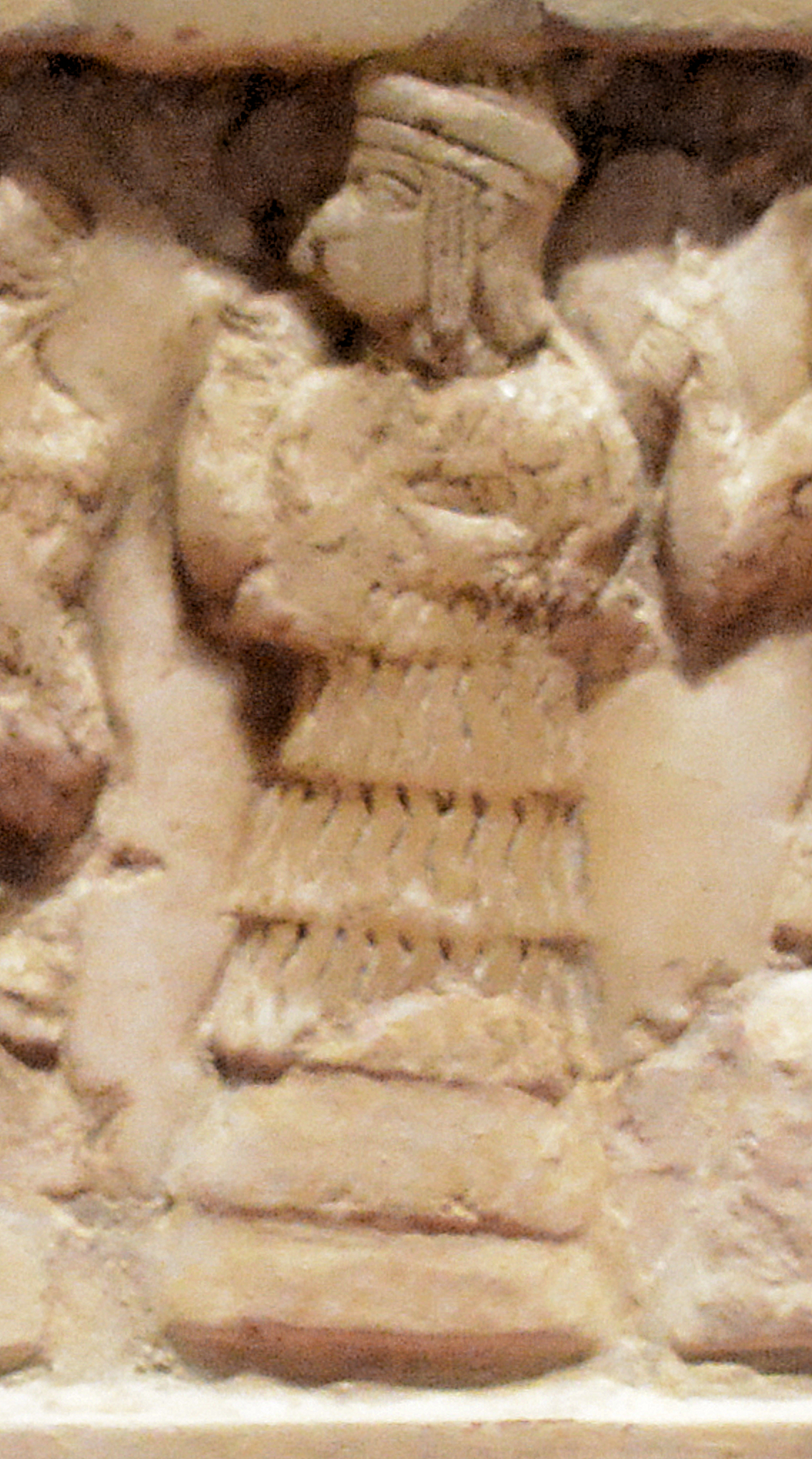
Enheduanna, daughter of Sargon of Akkad, circa 2300 BC

Enheduanna, daughter of Sargon of Akkad and high priestess of the moon god Nanna in Ur, was regarded by scribes of the Old Babylonian period (2004-1595 BC) as the author of several hymns that they copied during their school studies. Among these works, written in Sumerian, are two hymns to the goddess Inanna (Ishtar), The Exaltation of Inanna (or Queen of All Cosmic Powers) and Passionate(?) Inanna, in which she speaks in the first person and recounts, among other things, having endured difficult times during her city’s revolt against Akkadian rule. A third work, the Temple Hymns is dedicated to several temples and their occupants—the deities to whom they were dedicated. Modern historians debate whether these works were actually written by Enheduanna or are later, apocryphal, compositions attributed to her because she belonged to the prestigious Akkadian dynasty. Several of them believe that she is indeed the author of these poems, particularly because they could reflect Akkadian royal ideology (the role of Ishtar, the unity of the kingdom). She would thus be the oldest known poet and named author. But since no manuscripts are preserved from her lifetime, this remains a matter of debate.

=== Technology ===
A tablet from the periods reads, "(From the earliest days) no-one had made a statue of lead, (but) Rimush king of Kish, had a statue of himself made of lead. It stood before Enlil; and it recited his (Rimush's) virtues to the idu of the gods". The copper Bassetki Statue, cast with the lost wax method, testifies to the high level of skill that craftsmen achieved during the Akkadian period.

== Legacy and Reception ==
The Akkadian Empire had a profound impact on the history of Mesopotamia. The old system of city-states gave way to a new form of state whose mission was universal domination. The kingdom of the Third Dynasty of Ur, established a few decades after the fall of Akkad, stood in the tradition of this 'first empire.' From that point on, the kings of Akkad—first and foremost Sargon and Naram-Sin—became heroic figures who served as models for the Mesopotamian royal ideology that they themselves had helped to shape. However, they were viewed in opposite ways: the former became the example to follow, symbolizing the empire’s rise to power, while the latter became the example to avoid, symbolizing its excessive pride and decline.

During the Old Babylonian Empire (1894-1595 BC), scribes copied inscriptions from Akkadian rulers, and several 'historical' omen texts refer to (partly imaginary) events related to the Akkadian period: for example, an “omen of the fall of Akkad,” or an omen regarding Naram-Sin’s siege of a city called Apishal. This period was chosen for its evocative significance for kingship. Over the course of the next centuries, several rulers adopted the title 'King of Akkad,' positioning themselves as successors to their illustrious predecessors. Sargon and Naram-Sin were also the objects of a cult, likely beginning as early as the Ur III period. Their statues were still venerated under the rule of the Achaemenid Persians (6th-5th century BC). Shortly before that, priests from Sippar during the preceding period created a forged deed of donation purportedly granted by Manishtushu to their temple (the 'cruciform monument').

The kings of Akkad were also the subject of more elaborate narrative texts, legends that further mythologize them. Sargon inspired a vast body of literature, which was sometimes overinterpreted by modern historians because few inscriptions and texts from his reign have survived. It is difficult to figure out to what extent these accounts, which are attested up to the end of the Neo-Assyrian period (8th-7th century BC), are faithful to historical reality. This is the case with the most famous of them, the Autobiography of Sargon, which recounts how Sargon was abandoned at birth by his mother (a priestess who was forbidden to have children), who placed him in a wicker basket on the Euphrates, on which he drifted all the way to Kish, where he was taken in by a well-digger, before later being supported by the goddess Ishtar, who helped him seize power. Several tales recount his martial exploits, notably the one titled Sargon, King of Battle. It describes a campaign—likely legendary—that he is said to have waged in Anatolia against the city of Purushanda. A copy in Hittite was found in Hattusha, the capital of the Hittites, as well as an Akkadian version of the tale in Tell el-Amarna, in Egypt, demonstrating that the legend of Sargon resonated beyond Mesopotamia.

Perhaps as early as the beginning of the Ur III period, but certainly by the beginning of the 2nd millennium BC, scribes in royal circles felt the need to justify the fall of Akkad with a theological explanation, and retrospectively placed it during the reign of Naram-Sin. They proceeded to compose a text in Sumerian, referred to by modern historians as the Curse of Akkad It recounts that Naram-Sin lost the support of the gods and that the greatest among them, Enlil, denied him permission to rebuild his temple in Nippur. In a fit of rage, Naram-Sin had the temple destroyed and thus brought upon himself the curse of the gods, who condemned his kingdom to destruction, with the Gutians serving as the unwitting agents of divine punishment. This explanation for the fall of Akkad served to legitimize the power of the kings of Ur. It is this image of a proud and sinful king that Mesopotamian tradition has forged regarding Naram-Sin. It is also found in the Legend of Kutha, in which the king refuses to heed the bad omens regarding a battle he is about to wage, and subsequently loses. But he ultimately prevails in battle when the omens are favorable to him. The great revolt that took place during his reign also gave rise to a literary tradition.

"...Enlil brought out of the mountains those who do not resemble other people, who are not reckoned as part of the Land, the Gutians, an unbridled people, with human intelligence but canine instincts and monkeys' features. Like small birds they swooped on the ground in great flocks. Because of Enlil, they stretched their arms out across the plain like a net for animals. Nothing escaped their clutches, no one left their grasp. Messengers no longer traveled the highways, the courier's boat no longer passed along the rivers. The Gutians drove the trusty (?) goats of Enlil out of their folds and compelled their herdsmen to follow them, they drove the cows out of their pens and compelled their cowherds to follow them. Prisoners manned the watch. Brigands occupied the highways. The doors of the city gates of the Land lay dislodged in mud, and all the foreign lands uttered bitter cries from the walls of their cities ..."

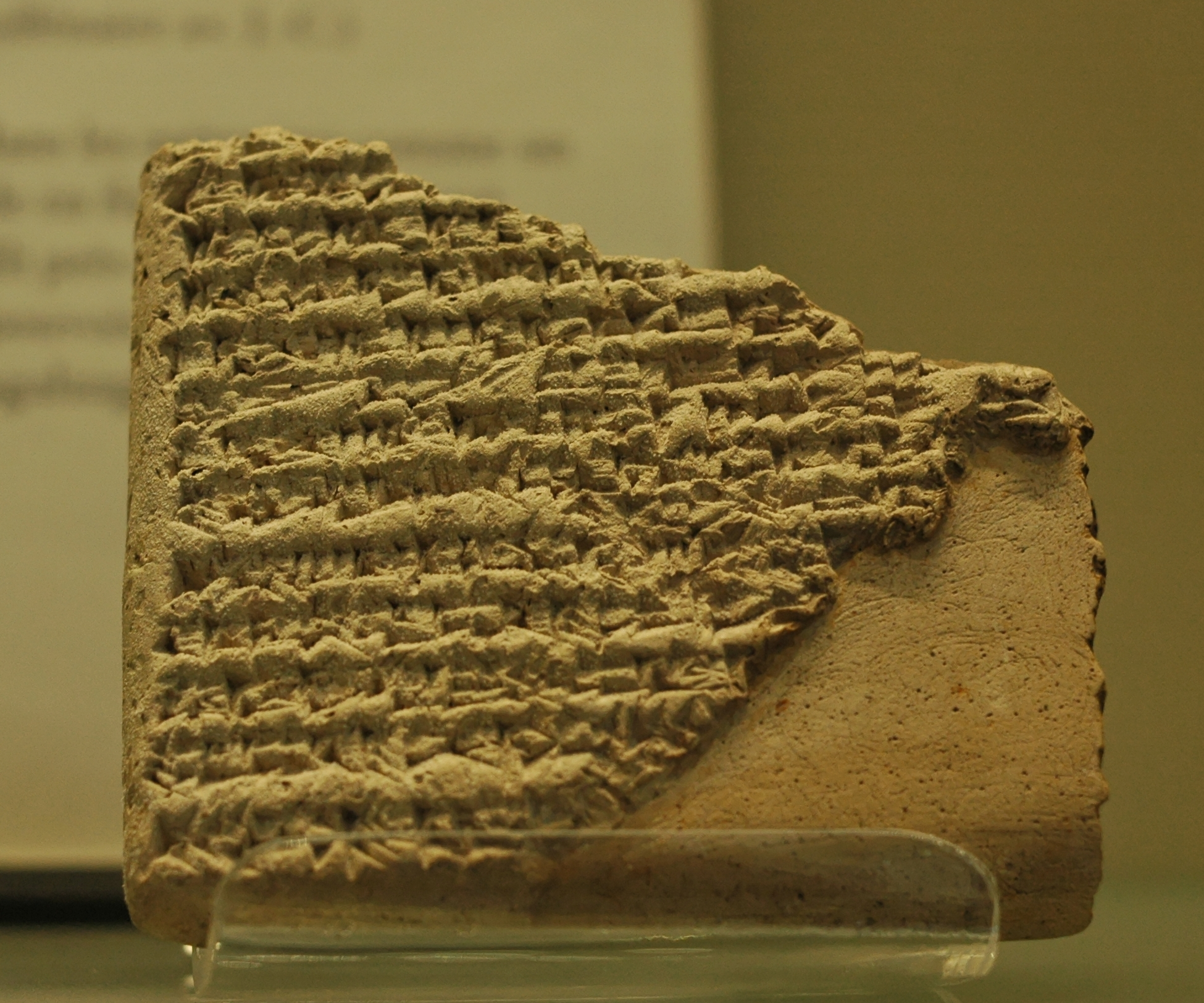
Tablet from the Old Babylonian period (early 2nd millennium BC): legend of the birth of Sargon of Akkad. Louvre Museum.

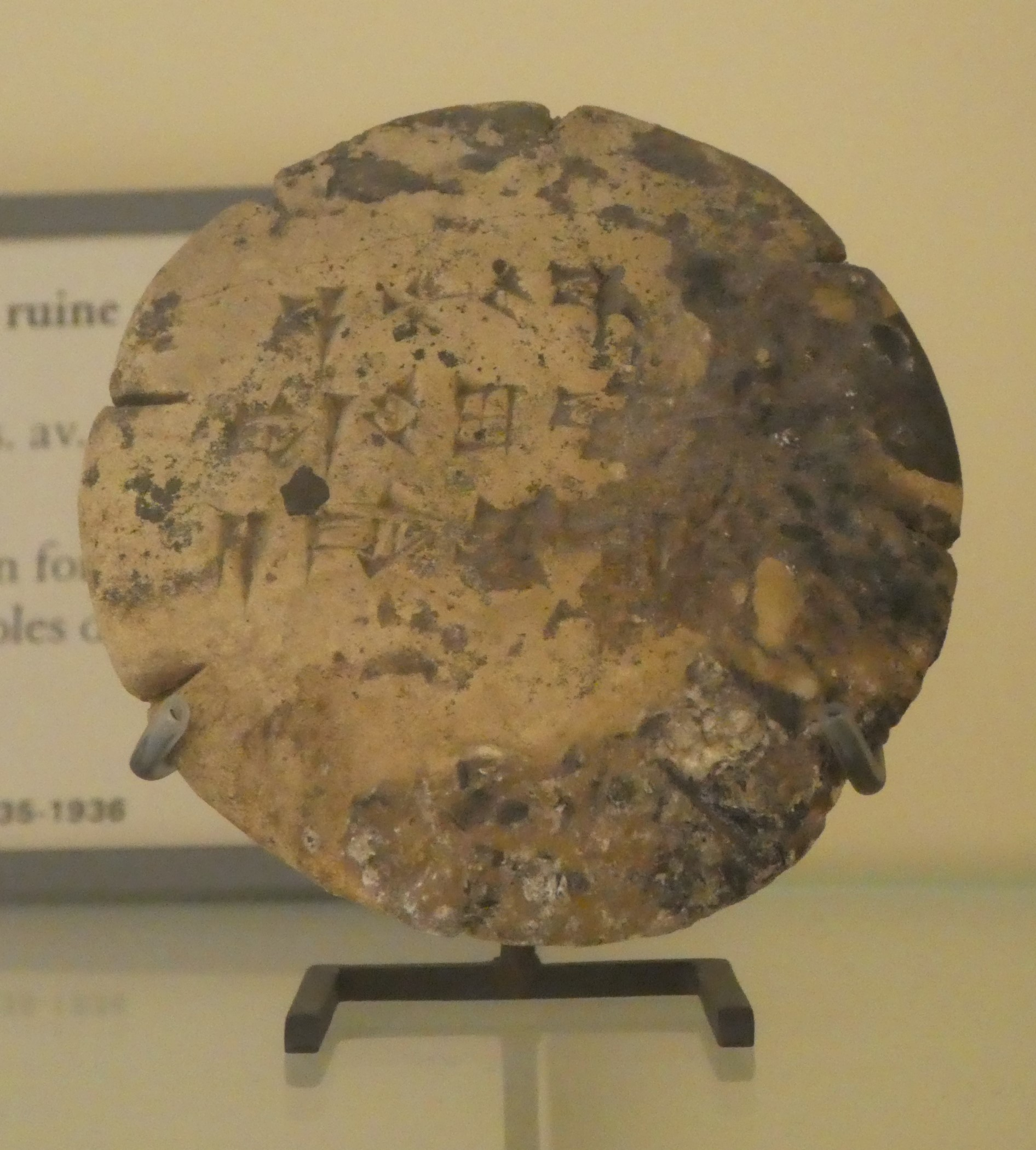
Tablet recording an “omen of the fall of Akkad,” following a hepatoscopy consultation at Mari, Syria. Early 18th century BC, Louvre Museum.

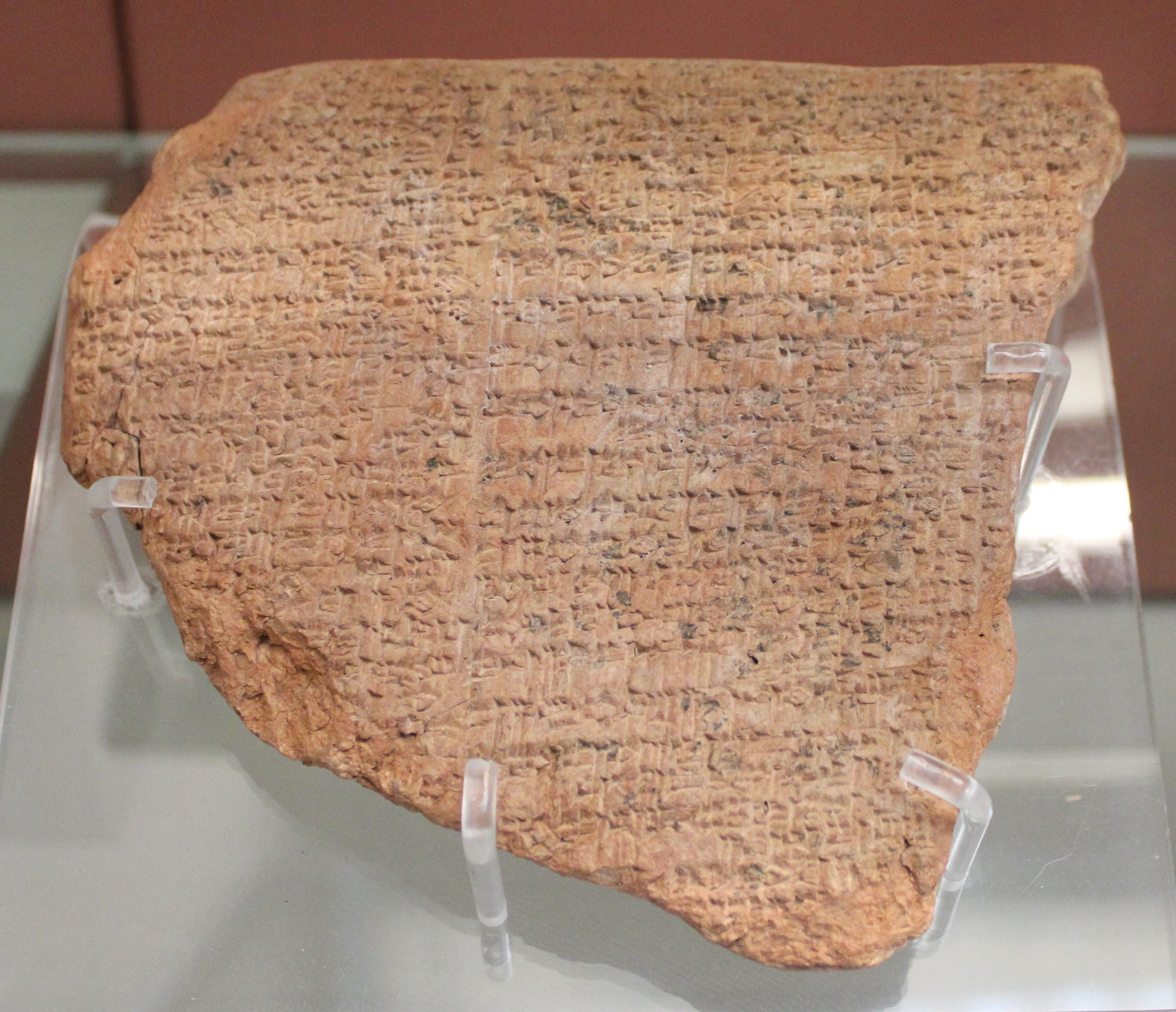
Account of the capture of Apishal by Naram-Sin. Early 2nd millennium BC, British Museum.

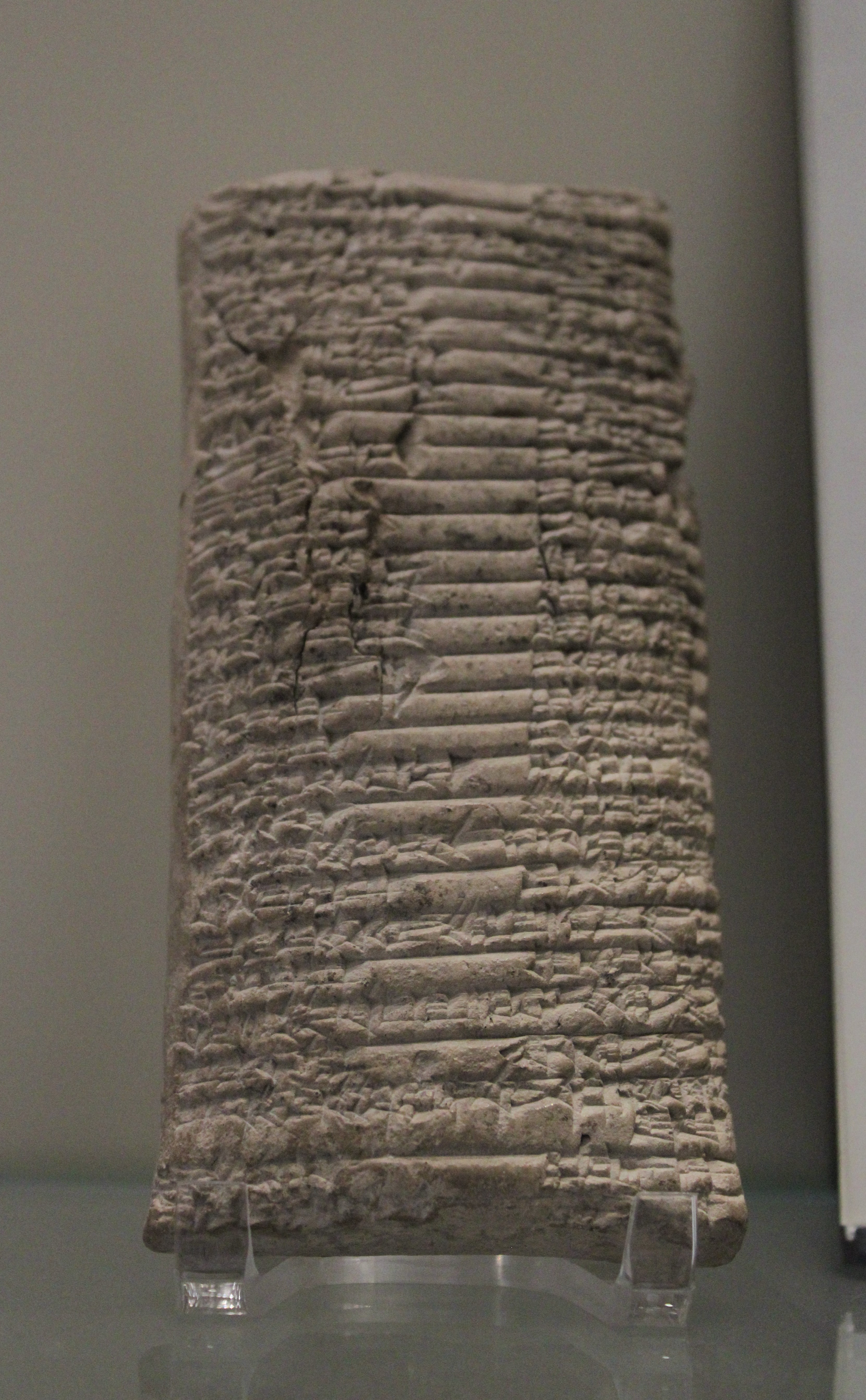
Account of the Curse of Akkad. Early 2nd millennium BC, Louvre Museum.

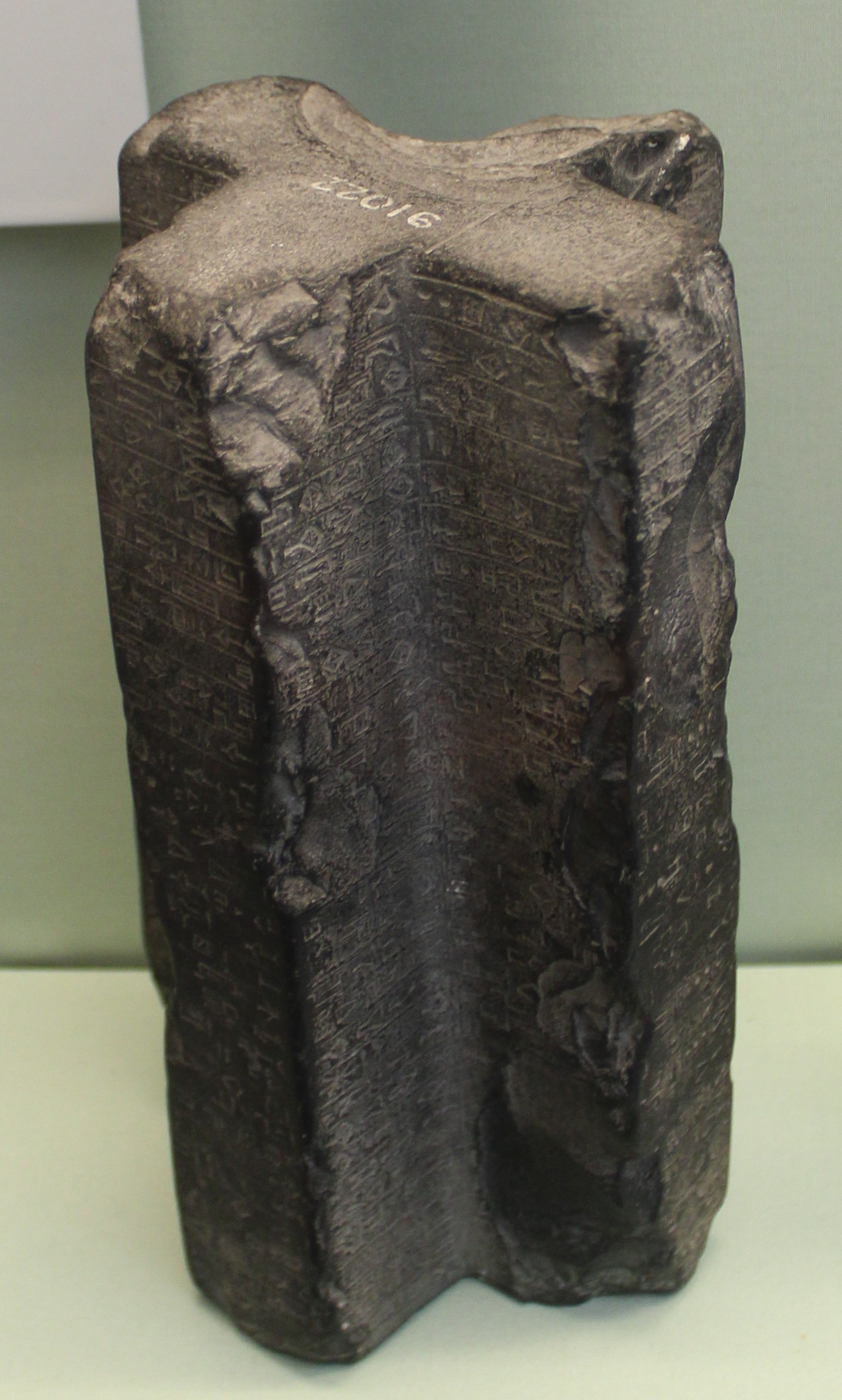
“Cruciform Monument of Manishtushu,” a forged donation charter made around 700–500 BC. British Museum.

== See also ==
- List of cities of the ancient Near East
- List of Mesopotamian deities
- History of Mesopotamia
- List of Mesopotamian dynasties

== Bibliography ==
=== Mesopotamian civilization, Sumer and Akkad ===
- Aruz, Joan, ed. (2003). Art of the First Cities: The Third Millennium B.C. from the Mediterranean to the Indus. New York: Metropolitan Museum of Art.
- Bahrani, Zainab (2017). Mesopotamia: Ancient Art and Architecture. London: Thames & Hudson.
- Crawford, Harriett, ed. (2013). The Sumerian World. London and New York: Routledge.
- Liverani, Mario (2014). The Ancient Near East: History, Society and Economy. London: Routledge.

=== Overviews ===
- Foster, Benjamin R. (2016). The Age of Agade: Inventing empire in ancient Mesopotamia. Londres and New York: Routledge / Taylor & Francis Group.
- Lafont, Bertrand (2017). "Akkad, l'empire charismatique (2330-2100)". Mésopotamie: De Gilgamesh à Artaban (3300-120 av. J.-C.). Mondes anciens (in French). Paris: Belin. pp. 165–199.
- McMahon, Augusta (2012). "The Akkadian Period: Empire, Environment, and Imagination". In Daniel T. Potts (ed.). A Companion to the Archaeology of the Ancient Near East. Blackwell companions to the ancient world. Malden and Oxford: Blackwell Publishers. pp. 649–667.
- Michalowski, Piotr (2020). "The Kingdom of Akkad in Contact with the World". In Karen Radner, Nadine Moeller and Daniel T. Potts (ed.). The Oxford History of the Ancient Near East, Volume I: From the Beginnings to Old Kingdom Egypt and the Dynasty of Akkad. New York: Oxford University Press. pp. 686–764.
- Schrakamp, Ingo (2020). "The Kingdom of Akkad: A View from Within". In Karen Radner, Nadine Moeller and Daniel T. Potts (ed.). The Oxford History of the Ancient Near East, Volume I: From the Beginnings to Old Kingdom Egypt and the Dynasty of Akkad. New York: Oxford University Press. pp. 612–685.
- Westenholz, Aage (1999). "The Old Akkadian Period: History and Culture". Mesopotamien: Akkade-Zeit und Ur III-Zeit. Orbis Biblicus et Orientalis. Freiburg and Göttingen: Universitätsverlag Freiburg Schweiz and Vandenhoeck & Ruprecht. pp. 17–118.
- Steinkeller, Piotr (2021). "The Sargonic and Ur III Empires". In Peter Fibiger Bang, C.A. Bayly and Walter Scheidel (ed.). The Oxford World History of Empire. Oxford: Oxford University Press. pp. 43–72.

=== Specialized studies ===
- Amiet, Pierre (1976). L'art d'Agadé au musée du Louvre (in French). Paris: Éditions des Musées nationaux.
- Liverani, Mario, ed. (1993). Akkad: The First World Empire: Structure, Ideology Traditions. Padova: Sargon srl. ISBN 978-8-81120-468-8
- Eppihimer, Melissa (2019). Exemplars of Kingship: Art, Tradition, and the Legacy of the Akkadians. Oxford: Oxford University Press.

=== Texts ===
- Frayne, Douglas R. (1993). The Sargonic and Gutian Periods (2334–2113). Toronto: University of Toronto Press.
- Westenholz, Joan Goodnick (1997). Legends of the Kings of Akkade. Winona Lake: Eisenbrauns.
