= Pig stele of Edessa =

Ancient Roman inscription

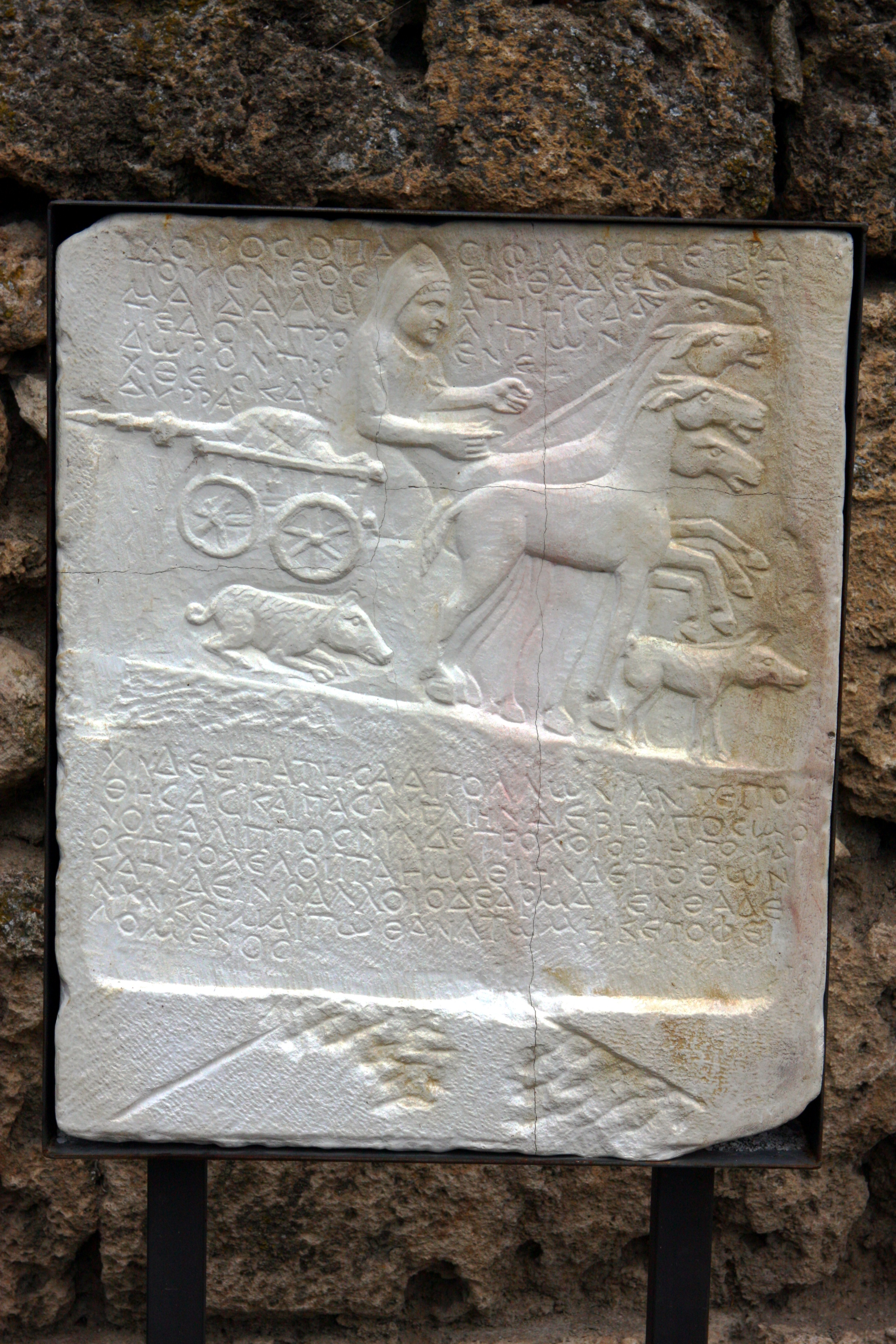
A copy of the stele in Edessa

The pig stele of Edessa is a Roman-era illustrated Greek funerary stele from the town of Edessa, Macedonia. The relief depicts a man on a four-wheeled chariot with four horses and two pigs, one under the wheel and one under the horse hooves. The inscription is dated to the second or third century CE and reads:

== Text ==
Translation

A pig, friend to everybody
a four-footed youngster
here I lie, having left
behind the land of Dalmatia,
offered as a gift,
and Dyrrachion I trod
and Apollonia, yearning
and all the earth I crossed
on foot alone unscathed.
But by the force of a wheel
I have now lost the light,
longing to see Emathia
and the chariot of Phallos
Here now I lie, owing
nothing to death anymore

Greek text

χοῖρος ὁ πᾶσι φίλος,
τετράπους νέος,
ἐνθάδε κεῖμαι
Δαλματίης δάπεδον προλιπὼν
δῶρον προσενεχθείς
καὶ Δυρράχιν δὲ ἐπάτησα
Ἀπολλωνίαν τε ποθήσας
καὶ πᾶσαν γαίην διέβην
ποσὶ μοῦνος ἄλιπτος
νῦν δὲ τροχοῖο βίῃ
τὸ φάος προλέλοιπα
Ἠμαθίην δὲ ποθῶν
κατιδεῖν φαλλοῖο δὲ ἅρμα
ἐνθάδε νῦν κεῖμαι
τῷ θανάτῳ μηκέτ' ὀφειλόμενος

== Analysis ==
In antiquity, Greek and Latin epitaphs for animals, either real or in jocular fiction, constitute a traditional Hellenistic poetic theme. Epigrams in the seventh book of the Greek Anthology commemorate a dolphin, a cicada, a partridge, a swallow, a jay, an ant, a grasshopper, a rabbit, a horse, and, most famously, a Maltese toy-dog. The funerary relief of Edessa is unique in antiquity in commemorating a pig and a traffic accident.

While the inscription is noteworthy for its description of the Via Egnatia and information on Phallic processions, the main controversy concerns the interpretation of the word CHOIROS, inscribed like the rest of the poem in Greek majuscule. Is the inscription about a pig (choiros) or a man named Choiros? Choirilos is attested as a name, as are other personal names such as Choiron, Choirothyon ("pig-sacrificer"), Choiridion, Choirine (-a), Choiro, Choiris (female) and around twenty males were named Choiros.

If the inscription refers to an actual pig the story might be reconstructed as follows: A pig-merchant, engaged in business on the Via Egnatia, bought pigs from Dalmatia and conveyed them on a chariot. At Edessa, a pig fell off the chariot and was crushed under the wheel. An artist and poet created the relief and epitaph, either commissioned by the merchant or on their own. The information that the pig travelled on foot alone steadily would be intended humorously; so too the comment that it longed to see the Dionysiac Phallic processions, if indeed pigs were sacrificed there. Another possible reconstruction is that pigs, bought in Dalmatia, were walking down a road in Edessa, led by a priest for the Dionysiac festival, when a chariot or the Phallic chariot crushed one. This may explain the fact that two pigs are depicted.

If the inscription refers to a man named Choiros we might interpret it thus: A slave freed (as an offered gift) at Dalmatia, traveled alone on the Via Egnatia to his friends or relatives. At Edessa, he died in a chariot accident. Artists who heard the story made the relief and poem, playing on his name. In Christian funerary steles, a certain Pontius Leo had a lion depicted on his epitaph and a little pig was added to that of a child named Porcella.

A third line of interpretation might see the poem and stele as a purely fictional creation.

== Metre ==
The inscription is composed in dactylic hexameters (lines 1–6), with scriptio plena (line 3 δὲ ἐπάτησα Ἀπολλωνίαν = δ' ἐπάτησ' Ἀπολλωνίαν) and containing some awkward or missing features (particularly in line 3, where apparent short υ is to be read in Δυρράχιν unless emended as below to omit καὶ and read Δυρράχιον; and short o with long ι in Ἀπολλωνίαν, so emended below to Ἀπολωνίαν). There are missing syllables in line 5 (either u u - immediately before or after τὸ φάος, or at the end of the line as shown below). There is an apparent attempt at ending the verse with an elegiac couplet (6–7, dactylic hexameter followed by dactylic pentameter), but this would only be metrically successful and preserve the intended sense with deletions as shown below; as it stands the dactylic pentameter is distorted by the addition of a medial choriamb (τῷ θανάτῳ).

With metrical division of the lines, the inscription may be laid out as follows:

χοῖρος ὁ πᾶσι φίλος, τετράπους νέος, ἐνθάδε κεῖμαι

Δαλματίης δάπεδον προλιπὼν δῶρον προσενεχθείς,

[καὶ] Δυρράχι(o)ν δ' ἐπάτησ' Ἀπολ[λ]ωνίαν τε ποθήσας

καὶ πᾶσαν γαίην διέβην ποσὶ μοῦνος ἄλιπτος

νῦν δὲ τροχοῖο βίῃ τὸ φάος προλέλοιπα (u -)

Ἠμαθίην δὲ ποθῶν κατιδεῖν φαλλοῖο δὲ ἅρμα

[ἐνθάδε] νῦν κεῖμαι [τῷ] θανάτῳ μηκέτ' ὀφειλόμενος.

Choiros ho pasi philos, tetrapous neos, enthade keimai

Dalmatiēs dapedon prolipōn dōron prosenechtheis,

[kai] Dyrrachi(o)n d' epatēs' Apol[l]ōnian te pothēsas

Kai pasan gaiēn diebēn posi mounos aliptos

Nun de trochoio biē to phaos proleloipa [word missing?]

Ēmathiēn de pothōn katidein Phalloio de harma

[Enthade] nun keimai [tō] thanatō mēket' opheilomenos.

Notes:

Line 4: ἄλιπτος = ἄληπτος (hard to catch; so uncaught, unscathed)

Line 5: one might add to this line e.g. ταπεινός (tapeinos, "wretched").

== Bibliography ==
- G. Daux, "Epitaphe métrique d'un jeune porc, victime d'un accident," Bulletin de correspondance hellénique 94 (1970), 609–618.
- Supplementum epigraphicum graecum, Volume 26 edited by H W Pleket Page 182 (1976)
- Athens annals of archaeology, Volumes 3-4 Page 84 (1970)
- Opuscula romana, Volume 28 By Svenska institutet i Rom Page 47 2003
- Commentary by Photis Petsas mostly in Greek and following summary in English, under the Society for Macedonian Studies.
