= Stone of Terpon =

Ancient artifact discovered in France

The Stone of Terpon or Pebble of Antibes (Galet d'Antibes) is an ancient artifact excavated near the seawall of Antibes, France (the ancient Antipolis) in 1866. The stone is held in the Musée d’Histoire et d’Archéologie adjacent to that same seawall in Antibes. The stone's inscription has been dated to between 450 and 425 BC, and the object may once have marked the entrance to a brothel.

The inscription was dedicated by Terpon, servant of Aphrodite.

== Inscription ==
The stone is formed in a phallic shape (23" long, 8" thick, 73 lbs.), with a carved inscription in Ionic Greek reading:

ΤΕΡΠΩΝ ΕΙΜΙ ΘΕΑΣ ΘΕΡΑΠΩΝ
ΣΕΜΝΗΣ ΑΦΡΟΔΙΤΗΣ
ΤΟΙΣ ΔΕ ΚΑΤΑΣΤΗΣΑΣΙ ΚΥΠΡΙΣ
ΧΑΡΙΝ ΑΝΤΑΠΟΔΟΙΗ

In standard Greek orthography the text would read:

Τέρπων εἰμὶ θεάς θεράπων σεμνῆς Ἀφροδίτης
Τοῖς δὲ καταστήσασι Κύπρις χάριν ἀνταποδοίη.

It forms a distich in dactylic hexameter:

Tĕr-pōn — —	ei-mĭ thĕ- — U U	ās thĕră- — U U	pōn sĕm- — —	nēs ă-phrŏ- — U U	dītēs — —

tois dĕ kă- — U U	tăs-tē- — —	sā-sĭ kŭ- — U U	prīs khărĭn — U U	ănt-ă-pŏ- — U U	doi-ē — —

The inscription can be roughly translated as: "I am Terpon, servant of noble Aphrodite, may Kypris return grace to those who set up (the stone)."

== Catalog references ==
- L.H. Jeffery: Local Scripts of Archaic Greece (LSAG), no. 288.03
- H. Roehl, Inscriptiones Graecae antiquissimae (IGA), no. 551
- H. Roehl, Imagines Inscriptionum Graecarum antiquissimarum, edition 3 pp. 31 no. 52
- Carmina Epigraphica Graeca, no. 400.
