= Choerilus =

Choerilus may refer to:

- Choerilus (playwright), Greek writer of tragedies
- Choerilus of Iasus, Greek epic poet
- Choerilus of Samos, Greek epic poet
