= American Council =

American Council may refer to:

== Linguistics ==
- American Council of Teachers of Russian, an organization that has to advance research development in Russian and English language
- American Council on the Teaching of Foreign Languages, a national organization dedicated to the teaching of languages

== Religion ==
- American Anglican Council, a conservative organization within the Episcopal Church in the US
- American Council of Christian Churches, a militant fundamentalist organization set up in opposition to the Federal Council of Churches
- American Muslim Council, an Islamic organization that has been investigated for links to terrorism

== Science ==
- American Chemistry Council, an industry trade association for American chemical companies
- American Council on Science and Health, an advocacy organization founded in 1978 by Elizabeth Whelan

== Other fields ==
- American Council for Cultural Policy, a group of wealthy and politically influential antiquities dealers, collectors and lawyers
- American Council on Education, a non-profit lobbying organization for higher education in the US and which administers the GED Test
- American Council of Learned Societies, a private non-profit federation of sixty-eight scholarly organizations
- American Council of Life Insurers, a Washington-based lobbying and trade group for the life insurance industry
- American Council of the Blind, a nationwide organisation in the US
- American Council of Trustees and Alumni, an education organization
- American Council on Alcohol Problems, a federation of 37 state affiliates promoting the reduction of alcohol advertising
- American Foreign Policy Council, a non-profit organization dedicated to bringing information to those who make foreign policy
- American Pie Council, the only organization committed to preserving America's pie heritage
- American Plastics Council, a major trade association for the U.S. plastics industry
