= Mask of Warka =

Mask possibly depicting Inanna

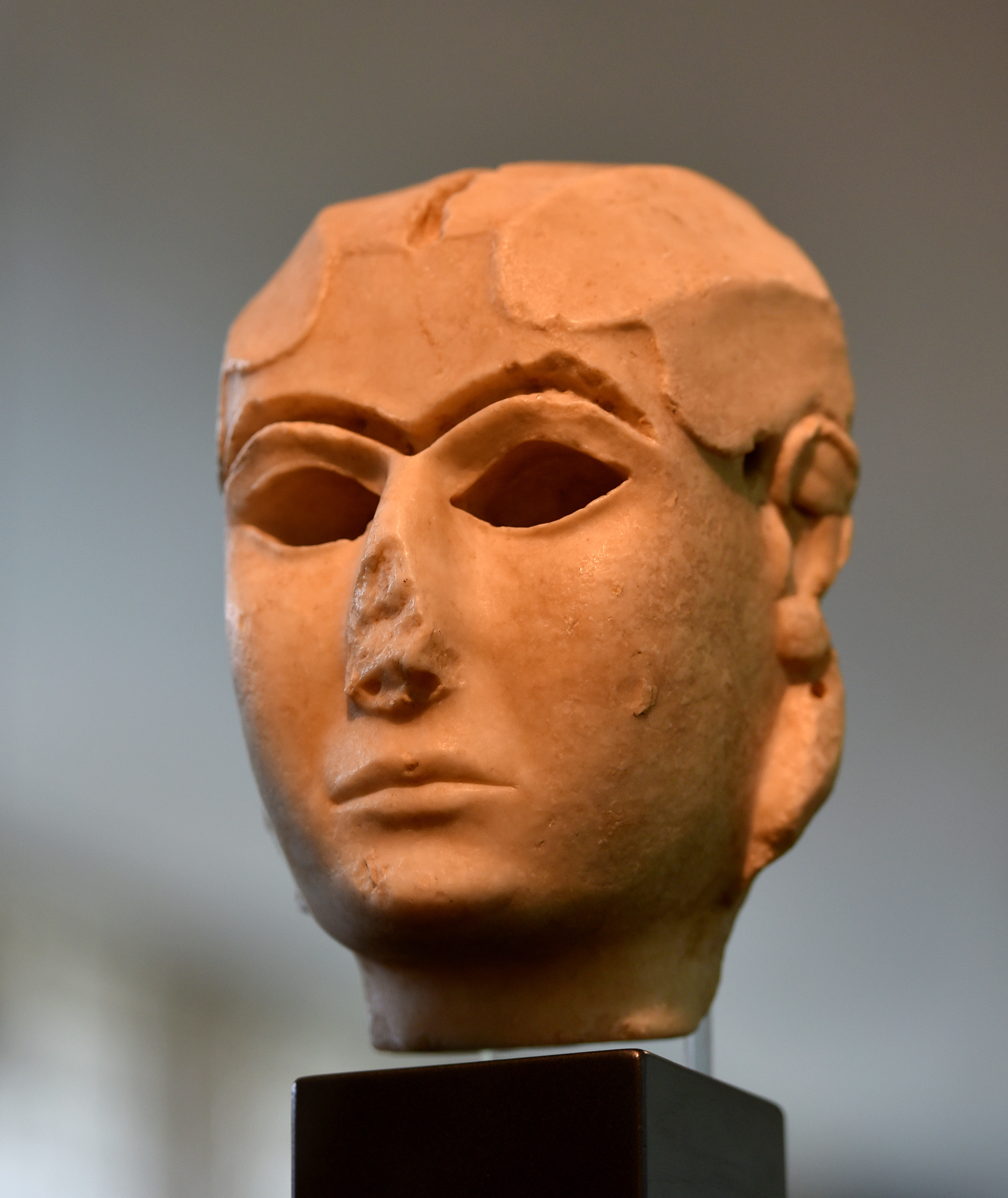
- Mask of Warka, National Museum of Iraq
- Created: 3200–3000 BC
- Present location: National Museum of Iraq, Iraq

Location

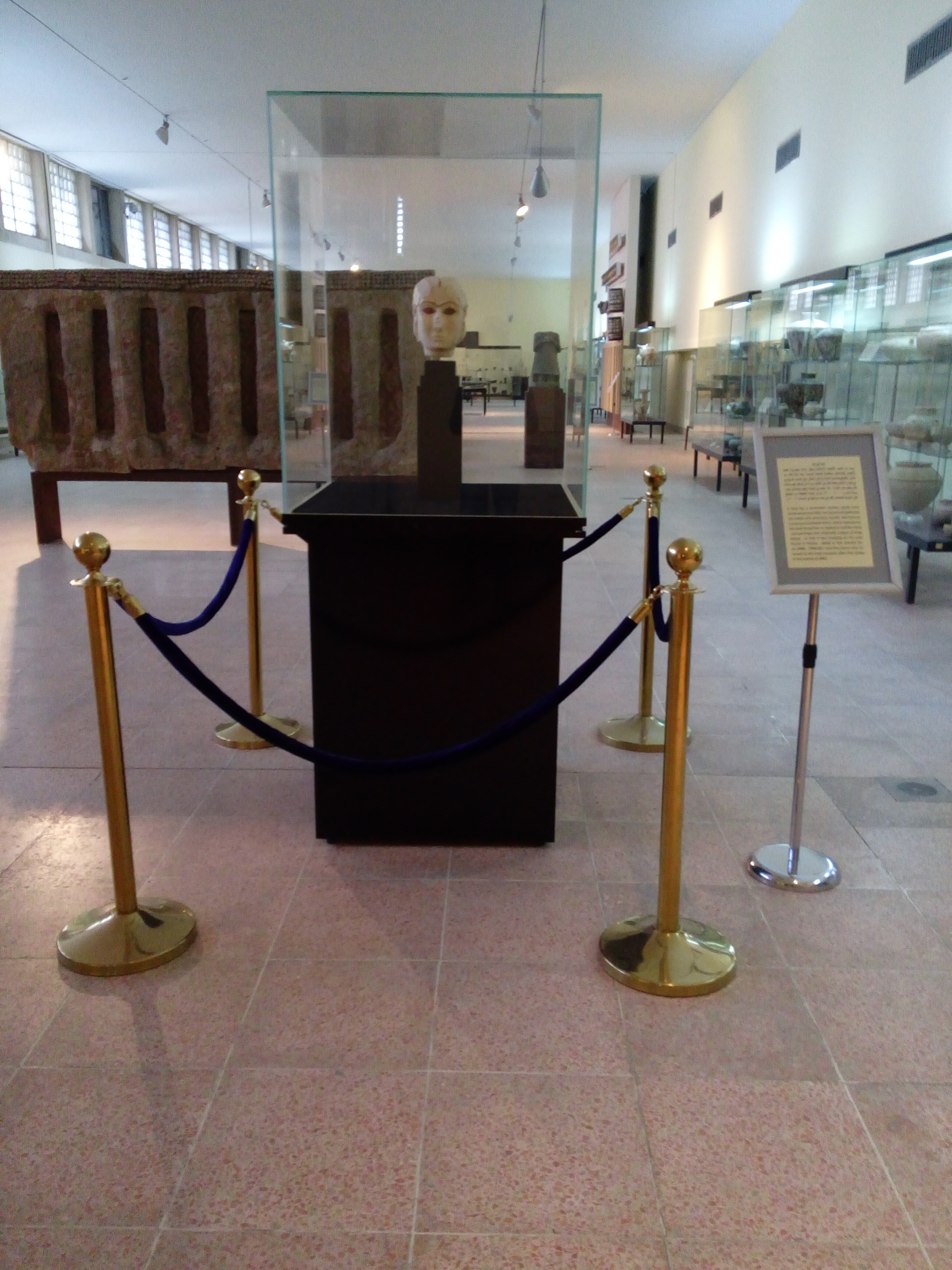
The Mask of Warka in the National Museum of Iraq today

The Mask of Warka (named after the modern village of Warka located close to the ancient city of Uruk), also known as the Lady of Uruk dating from 3100 BC, is one of the earliest known representations of the human face. The carved white marble female face is probably a depiction of Inanna. It is approximately 20 cm (8 inches) tall, and was probably incorporated into a larger wooden cult image, though it is only a presumption that a deity is represented. It is without parallels in the period. It is in the National Museum of Iraq, having been recovered undamaged after being looted during the United States invasion of Iraq in 2003.

It could depict a goddess. Inanna has been suggested. Shells may have served as the whites of the eyes, and a lapis lazuli, a blue semi-precious gemstone, may have formed the pupils.

== Description ==
The Mask of Warka is unique in that it is the first accurate depiction of the human face. Previous attempts, like the Tell Brak Head, were not anatomically accurate, and featured exaggerated noses and ears. At 21.2 centimetres (8.3 in) tall, the mask was most likely originally part of a whole, life sized statue, probably made of wood, with the exposed areas of "skin" (arms, hands, feet, and most obviously the head) being the only ones made of the much rarer white marble. The back of the head would have been covered with bitumen and then colored metal — most likely either gold leaf or copper. This combination would have then extended over the forehead in waves. This hairpiece would have been attached to the Mask with metal studs, which could possibly have been engraved. The hollowed out eyes and eyebrows bear traces of an ancient inlay, perhaps shell and lapis lazuli. Perforations at the ears indicate that the image once wore jewelry. Parts of the eyebrows and hair were also emphasized with colored inlays.

The back of the head is flat, with drill holes for attachment.

== Discovery ==
The Mask of Warka was discovered on 22 February 1939 by the expedition of the German Archaeological Institute, led by Dr A. Nöldeke, in the city of Uruk south of modern Baghdad. The Mask was found in the Eanna (or Ianna) district of the city — so named for the goddess Inanna to whom the temples are dedicated.

== Theft and recovery ==
When the United States invaded Iraq in 2003, the National Museum of Iraq (where the Mask of Warka was stored) was looted. The Mask is thought to have been taken between April 10 and 12 of that year, along with forty other pieces, including the Warka Vase and Bassetki Statue.

The effort to recover these artifacts was spearheaded by Marine Reserve Colonel Matthew Bogdanos, who started an investigation with his team on April 21. However, it was the 812th Military Police Company (Combat Support) USAR, out of Orangeburg, New York, that recovered the Mask just before October. According to Bogdanos, an informant, an individual, an Iraqi, walked into the museum with a tip that he knew where antiquities were being held or hidden, without identifying the mask. Acting on that information, members of the investigation who were still in Baghdad went to that location, conducted a reconnaissance, and then conducted a raid. The results of the raid were ultimately good, but Bogdanos explains that hopes were not initially high. "Initially they didn't find the Mask, but they found the owner of the farm – it's a farm in northern Baghdad – and after interviewing the farmer, he admitted that he did in fact have an antiquity, in this case the Mask, buried in the back of his farm. The investigators went behind the farm and uncovered the Mask exactly where he had placed it, and it is intact and undamaged."

== See also ==
- Art of Mesopotamia
- Warka Vase

== Gallery ==
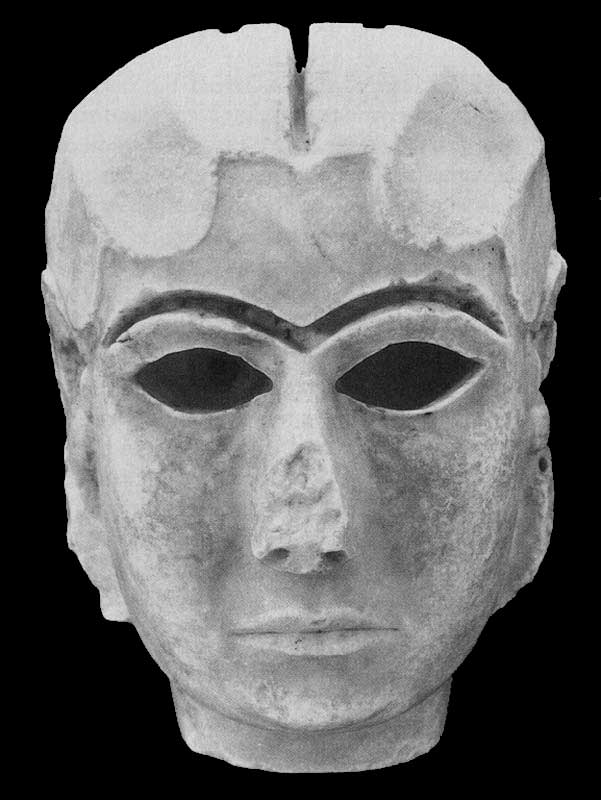
Mask of Warka

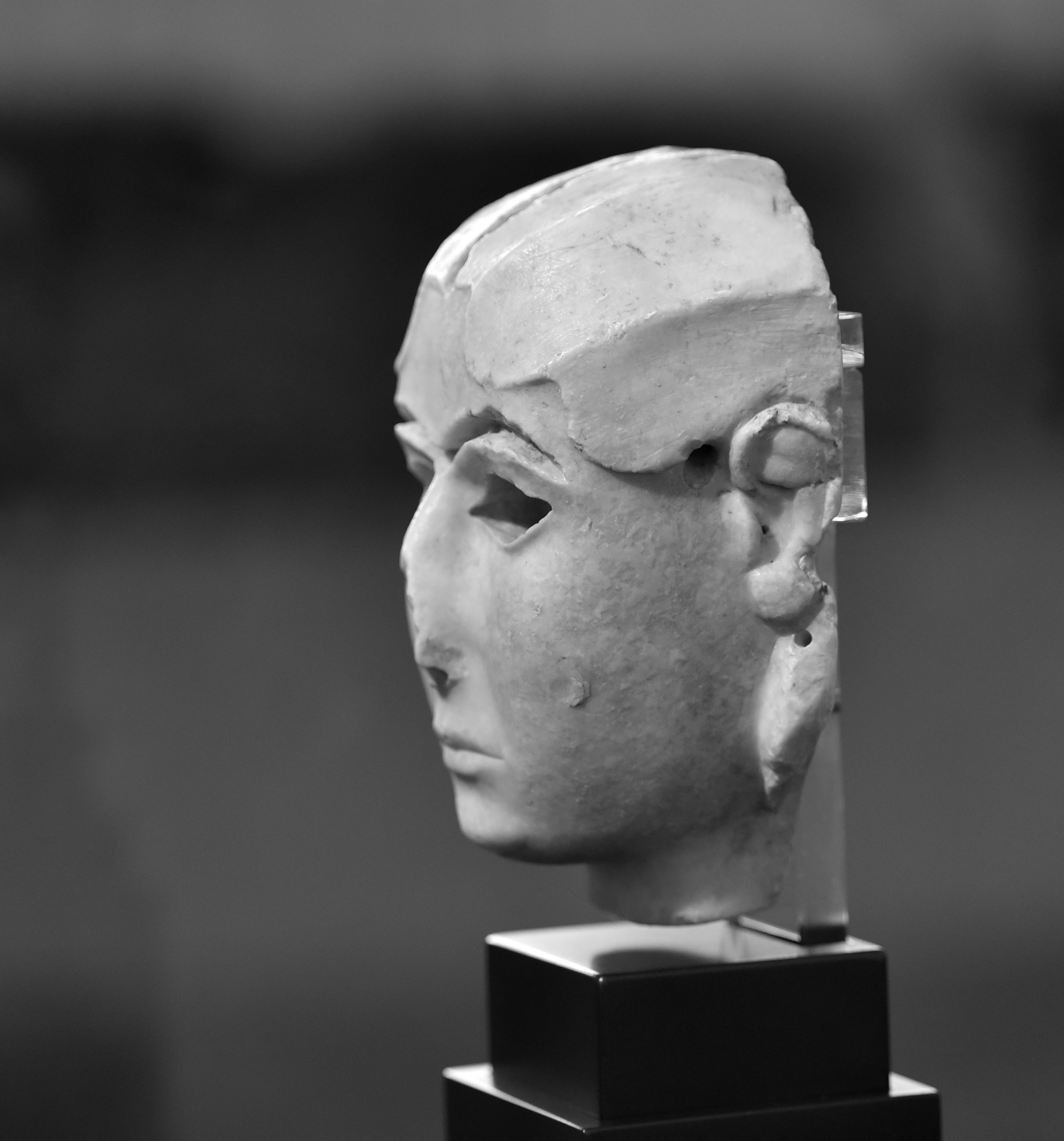
The Mask of Warka, in profile, the Iraq Museum in Baghdad

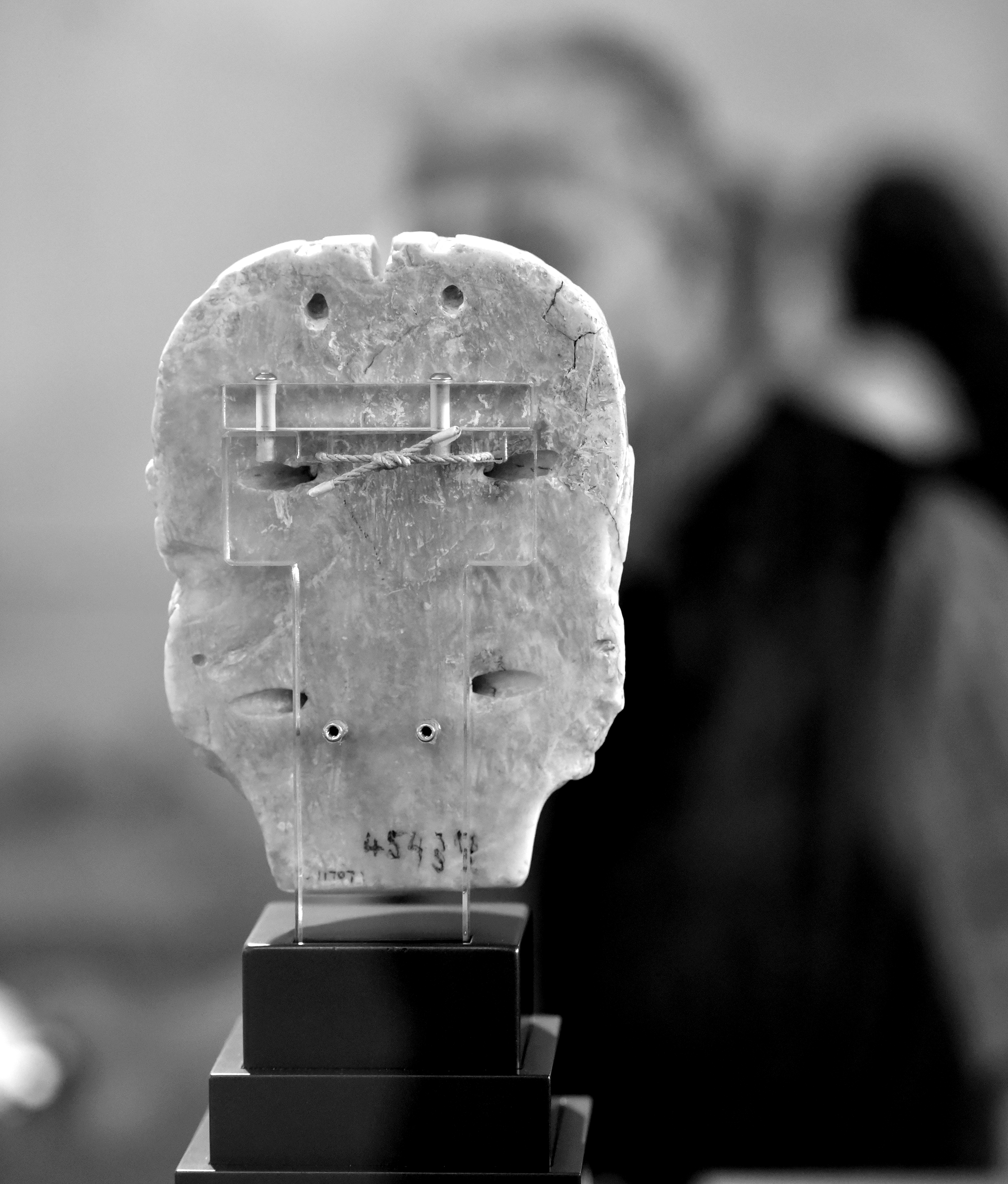
The Mask of Warka at the Iraq Museum in Baghdad, back view

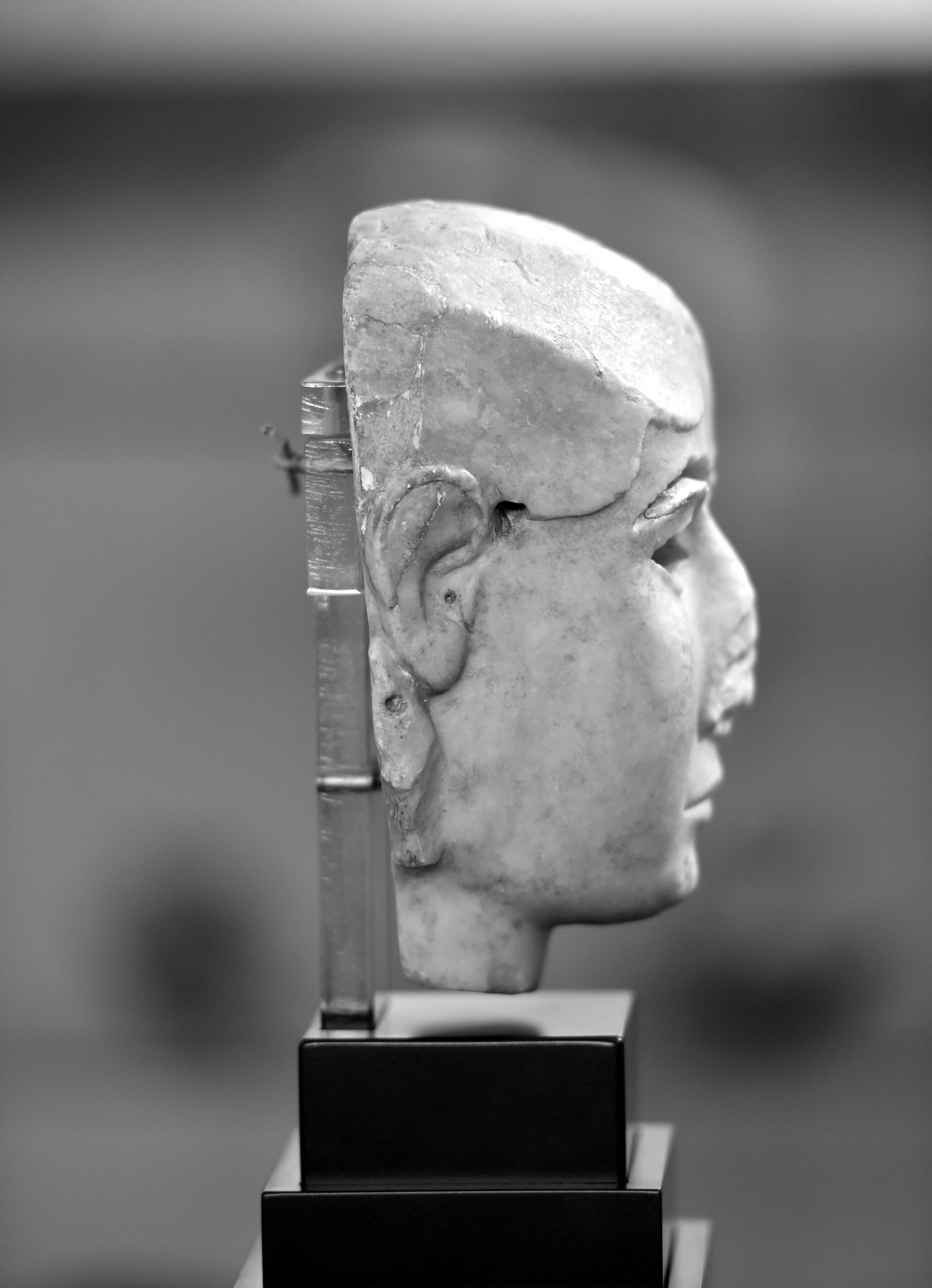
The Mask of Warka at the Iraq Museum in Baghdad, in profile

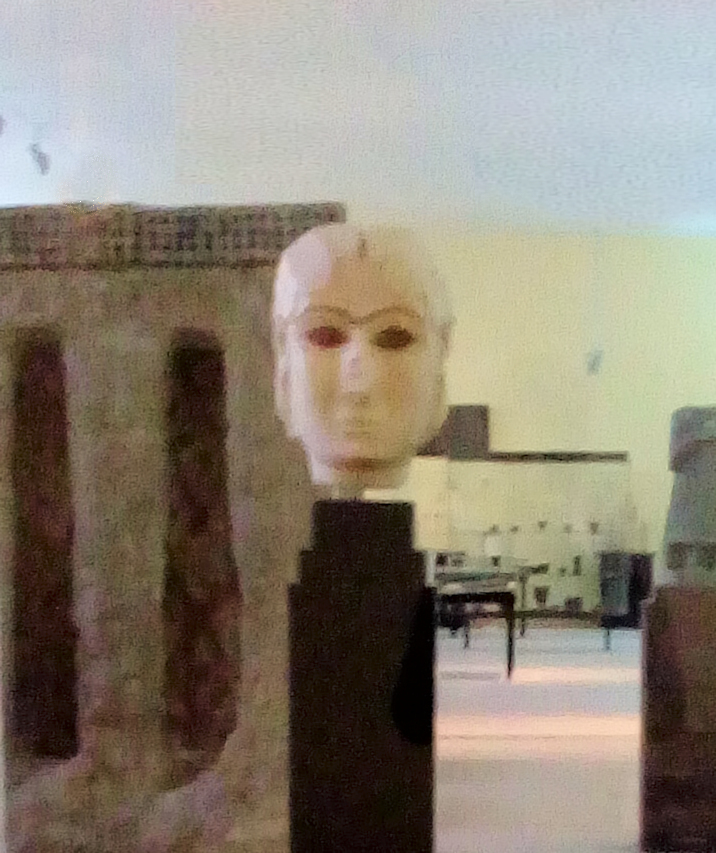
Warka Mask in Iraq National Museum
