= Iraq Museum =

National museum of Iraq

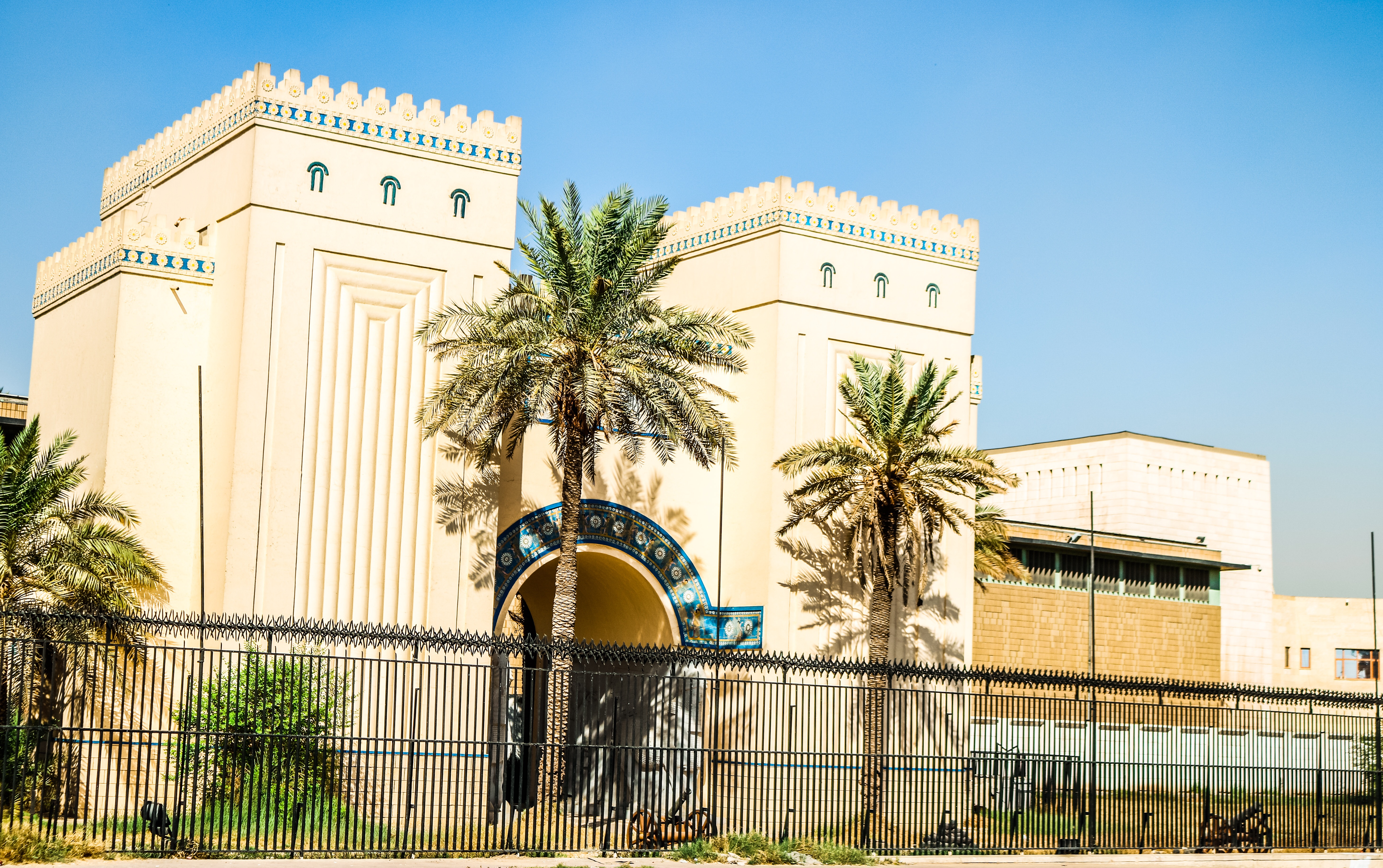
- Established: 1926; 100 years ago
- Location: Baghdad, Iraq
- Coordinates: 33°19′43″N 44°23′09″E
- Collection size: 170,000 – 200,000
- Visitors: Open
- Director: Luma Yas al-Duri
- Website: theiraqmuseum.com

The Iraq Museum (Arabic: المتحف العراقي) is the national museum of Iraq, located in Baghdad. The Iraq Museum contains relics from the Mesopotamian, Abbasid, and Persian civilizations. It was looted during and after the 2003 Invasion of Iraq. Despite international efforts, only some of the stolen artifacts have been returned. After being closed for many years for restoration, the museum officially reopened in February 2015. The director is Luma Yas Jasim al-Duri.

== Foundation ==
After World War I, archaeologists from Europe and the United States began several excavations throughout Iraq. In an effort to keep those findings from leaving Iraq, Gertrude Bell (a British traveller, intelligence agent, archaeologist, and author) began collecting the artifacts in a government building in Baghdad in 1922. On 14 June 1926, the Iraqi government moved the collection to a new building and established the Baghdad Antiquities Museum, with Bell as its director. Bell died later that year; the new director was Sidney Smith.

In 1966, the collection was moved again, to a two-story, 45,000-square-meter (480,000-square-foot) building in Baghdad's Al-Ṣāliḥiyyah neighborhood in the Al-Karkh district on the east side of the Tigris River. It is with this move that the name of the museum was changed to the Iraq Museum. It was originally known as the Baghdad Archaeological Museum.

Bahija Khalil became the director of the Iraq Museum in 1983. She was the first woman director and she held that role until 1989.

== Collections ==
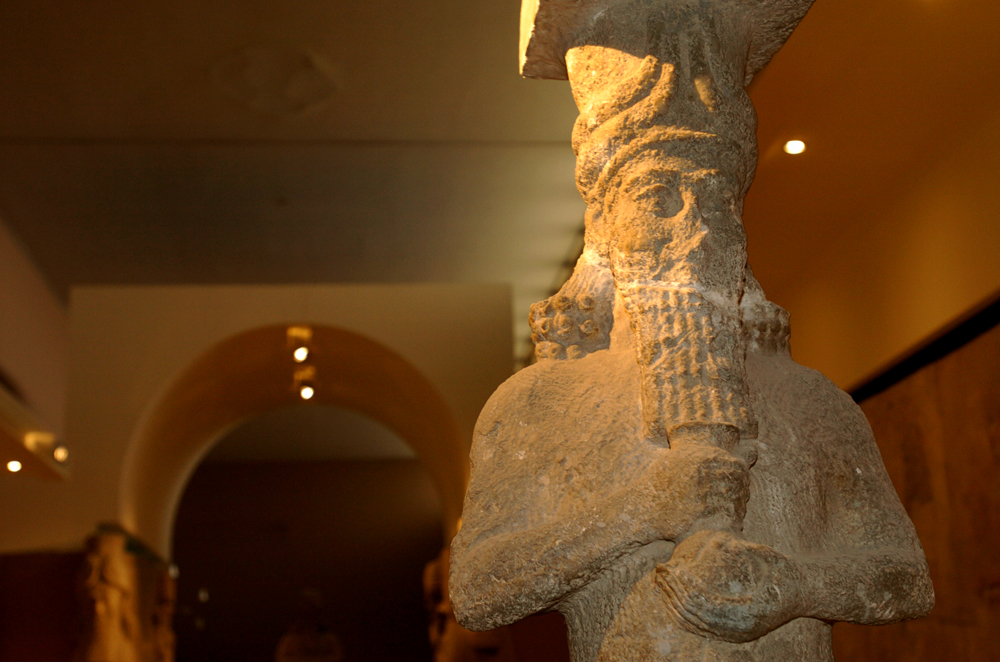
Exhibit during renovations in 2007

Due to the archaeological riches of Mesopotamia, the museum's collections are considered to be among the most important in the world, and it has a fine record of scholarship and display. The British connection with the museum — and with Iraq — has resulted in exhibits always being displayed bilingually, in both English and Arabic. It contains important artifacts from the over 5,000-year-long history of Mesopotamia in 28 galleries and vaults.

The collections of The Iraq Museum include art and artifacts from ancient Sumerian, Assyrian and Babylonian civilizations. The museum also has galleries devoted to collections of both pre-Islamic and Islamic Arabian art and artifacts. Of its many noteworthy collections, the Nimrud gold collection—which features gold jewelry and figures of the precious stone that date to the 9th-century BCE—and the collection of stone carvings and cuneiform tablets from Uruk are exceptional. The Uruk treasures date to between 3500 and 3000 BCE.

== Damage and losses during 2003 war ==
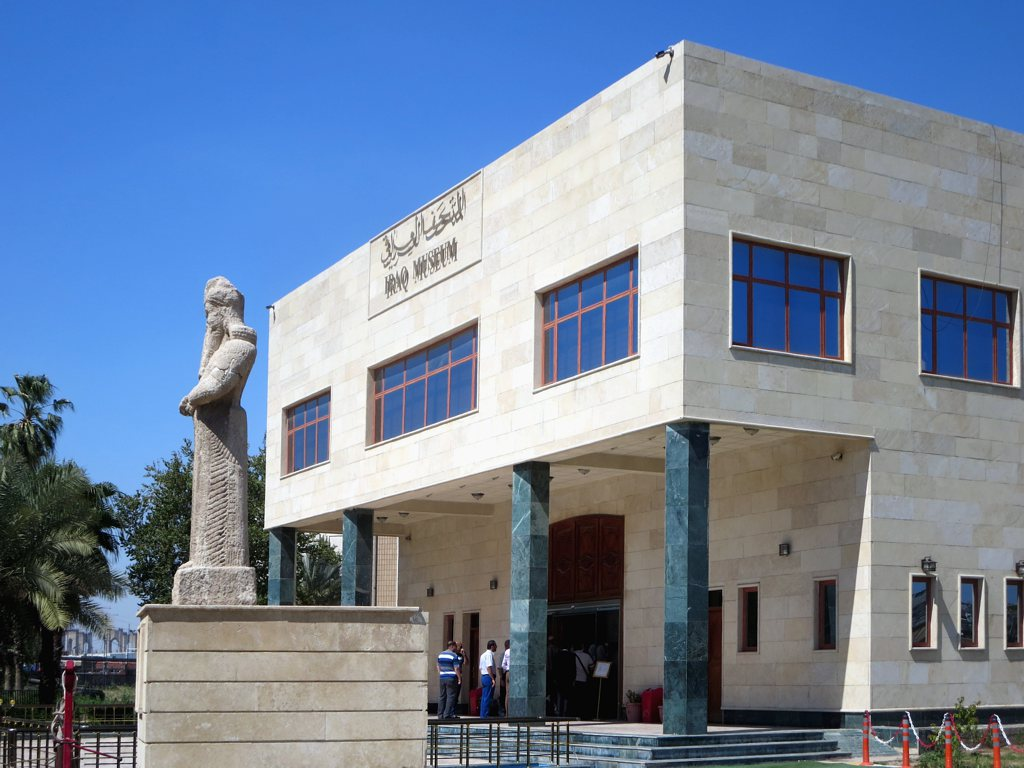
The Iraq Museum in Baghdad was looted in 2003 but has since reopened. A statue of Nabu, the 8th century BC Assyrian god of wisdom, stands before the building.

In the months preceding the 2003 Iraq war, starting in December and January, various antiquities experts, including representatives from the American Council for Cultural Policy asked the Pentagon and the UK government to ensure the museum's safety from both combat and looting, but no promises were made. U.S. forces did not bomb the site, despite them bombing a number of uninhabited Iraqi archaeological sites.

On April 9, 2003, the last of the museum curators and staff left the museum, including director Nawala Al-Mutawalli. Iraqi forces engaged U.S. forces a few blocks away, as well as the nearby Special Republican Guard compound. Lt. Col. Eric Schwartz of the U.S. third Infantry Division declared that he "was unable to enter the compound and secure it since they attempted to avoid returning fire at the building. Sniper positions, discarded ammunition, and 15 Iraqi Army uniforms were later discovered in the building". The positions turned out to be museum arranged sandbags and protective foam support and mitigation barriers for large size artefacts, the uniforms and ammunition turning out to belong to the museum curators and staff (being reserve military personnel in state of war) and to the contrary to the U.S. statement, no traces of any serious engagement were detected anywhere in the museum and its surrounding yard. Iraqi staff as a protective measure had built a fortified wall along the western side of the compound, allowing concealed movement between the front and rear of the museum, and the U.S. forces could have secured the museum by simply encircling and isolating it preventing the looters from accessing the facility.

Thefts took place between April 10 and 12, and when a number of museum staff returned to the building on April 12, they fended off further attempts by looters to enter the museum and had to wait until April 16 for the deployment of the U.S. forces around the museum. A special team headed by Marine Col. Matthew Bogdanos initiated an investigation on April 21. His investigation indicated that there were three separate thefts by three distinct groups over the four days. While the staff instituted a storage plan to prevent theft and damage (also used during the Iran–Iraq War and the first Gulf War), many larger statues, steles, and friezes had been left in the public galleries, protected with foam and surrounded by sandbags. Forty pieces were stolen from these galleries, mostly the more valuable ones. Of these only 13 had been recovered as of January 2005, including the three most valuable: the Sacred Vase of Warka (though broken in fourteen pieces, which was the original state it was found in when first excavated), the Mask of Warka, and the Bassetki Statue.

According to museum officials, the looters concentrated on the heart of the exhibition: "the Warka Vase, a Sumerian alabaster piece more than 5,000 years old; a bronze Uruk statue from the Akkadian period, also 5,000 years old, which weighs 660 pounds; and the headless statue of Entemena. The Harp of Ur was torn apart by looters who removed its gold inlay." Among the stolen artefacts is the bronze Bassetki Statue, a life-size statue of a young man, originally found in the village Basitke in the northern part of Iraq, an Akkadian Empire piece that goes back to 2300 B.C. and the stone statue of King Schalmanezer, from the eighth century BC.

In addition, the museum's above-ground storage rooms were looted. Approximately 3,100 excavation site pieces (jars, vessels, pottery shards, etc.) were stolen, of which only 3,000 have been recovered. The thefts did not appear to be discriminating; for example, an entire shelf of fakes was stolen, while an adjacent shelf of much greater value was undisturbed.

The third occurrence of theft was in the underground storage rooms. The thieves attempted to steal the most easily transportable objects, which had been intentionally stored in the most remote location possible. Of the four rooms, the only portion disturbed was a single corner in the furthest room, where cabinets contained 100 small boxes containing cylinder seals, beads, and jewelry. Evidence indicated that the thieves possessed special master keys to the cabinets but dropped them in the dark. Instead, they stole 10,000 small objects that were lying in plastic boxes on the floor. Of them, only 2,500 have approximately been recovered.

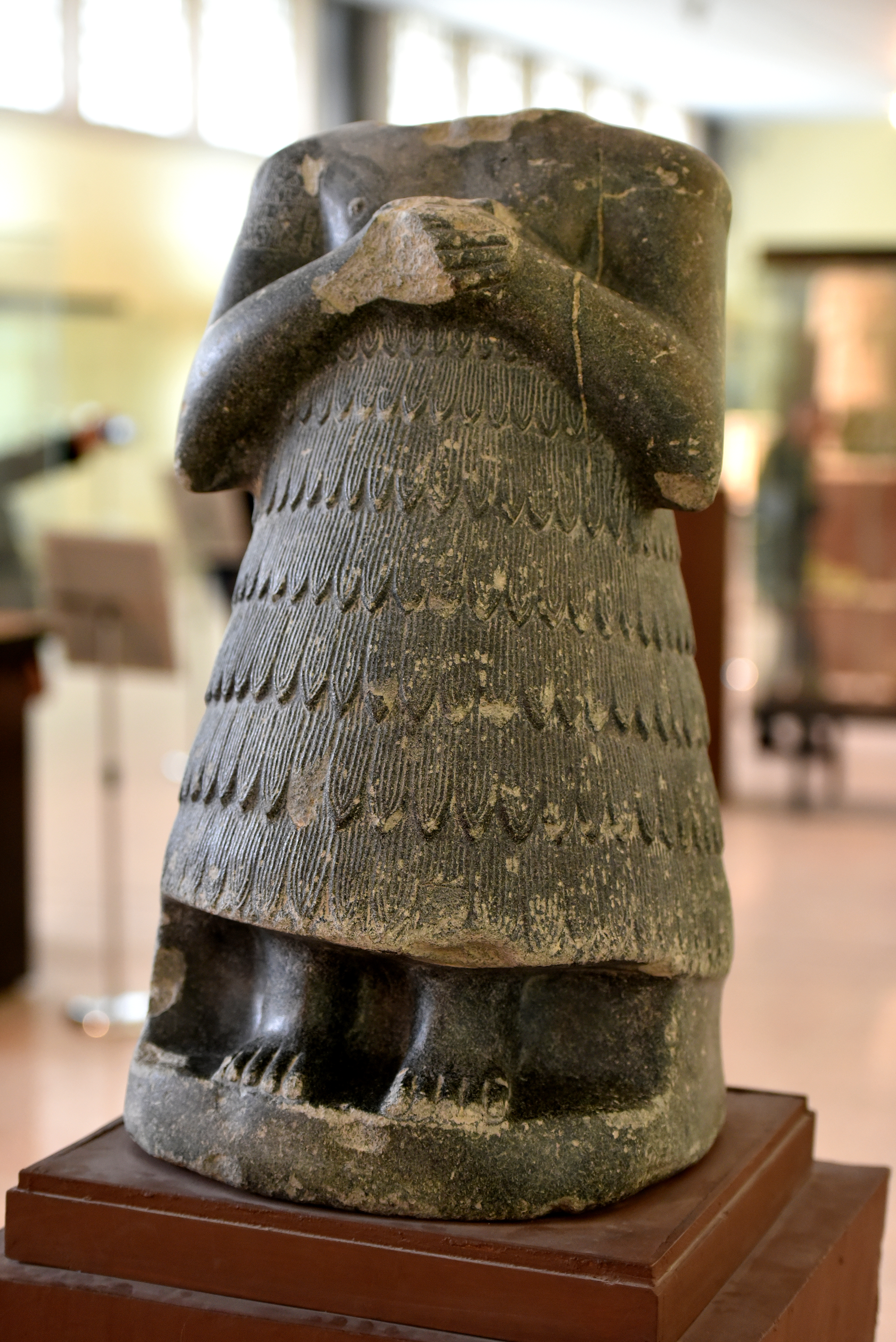
The statue of Entemena, back in the museum

One of the most valuable artifacts looted was a headless stone statue of the Sumerian king Entemena of Lagash. The Entemena statue, "estimated to be 4,400 years old, is the first significant artifact returned all the way from the United States and by far the most important piece found outside Iraq. American officials declined to discuss how they recovered the statue." The statue of the king, located in the center of the museum's second-floor Sumerian Hall, weighs hundreds of pounds, making it the heaviest piece stolen from the museum – the looters "probably rolled or slid it down marble stairs to remove it, smashing the steps and damaging other artifacts."

United States Immigration and Customs Enforcement (ICE) announced the recovery of the statue of King Entemena of Lagash on July 25, 2006, in the United States. The statue was returned to the Iraq government. It was discovered with the help of Hicham Aboutaam, an art dealer in New York City.

=== International reaction to the looting ===
The U.S. government was criticised for doing nothing to protect the museum after occupying Baghdad. Dr Irving Finkel of the British Museum said the looting was "entirely predictable and could easily have been stopped." Martin E. Sullivan, chairman of the U.S. president's Advisory Committee on Cultural Property, and U.S. State Department cultural advisers Gary Vikan and Richard S. Lanier resigned in protest at the failure of US forces to prevent the looting.

The extent of the looting of The Iraq Museum has been disputed. Based on a miscommunication by the first crews on the scene, and the empty display cases in the main galleries that in most cases had held objects which museum curators had removed before the First Gulf War and invasion, news organizations for weeks reported that as much as 170,000 catalogued lots (501,000 pieces) had been looted. The accurate figure was around 15,000 items, including 5,000 extremely valuable cylinder seals.

On April 12, 2003, The Associated Press reported: "The famed Iraq National Museum, home of extraordinary Babylonian, Sumerian and Assyrian collections and rare Islamic texts, sat empty Saturday – except for shattered glass display cases and cracked pottery bowls that littered the floor."

On April 14, National Public Radio's Robert Siegel announced on All Things Considered: "As it turned out, American troops were but a few hundred yards away as the country's heritage was stripped bare."

Reacting to the loss, French President Jacques Chirac on April 16, 2003, declared the incident "a crime against humanity."

When asked why the U.S. military did not try to guard the museum in the days after the invasion succeeded, Gen. Richard Myers, chairman of the Joint Chiefs of Staff, said "If you remember, when some of that looting was going on, people were being killed, people were being wounded ... It's as much as anything else a matter of priorities." Civil Affairs expert William Sumner, who was tasked with handling arts, monuments and archives, explained that the postwar Civil Affairs planners "didn't foresee the marines as going out and assigning marine units as security ... The issue of archaeological sites was considered a targeting problem," to be dealt with by those flying bombing missions. Secretary of Defense Donald Rumsfeld, speaking about the museum's looting, said "stuff happens" and "to try to pass off the fact of that unfortunate activity to a deficit in the war plan strikes me as a stretch," and described the period of looting in general as "untidiness." Secretary of State Colin Powell said, "The United States understands its obligations and will be taking a leading role with respect to antiquities in general but this museum in particular," but all such promises were only partially honoured considering the staggering increase in Iraqi archaeological site looting during the U.S. occupation period of Iraq.

Two weeks after the museum thefts, Dr. Donny George Youkhanna, General Director Research Studies for the Board of Antiquities in Iraq, stated of the looting, "It's the crime of the century because it affects the heritage of all mankind." After the U.S. Marines set up headquarters in Baghdad's Palestine Hotel, Dr Youkhanna confirmed that he personally went there to plead for troops to protect the museum's onsite collection, but no guards were sent for another three days.

=== Attempts to recover lost items ===
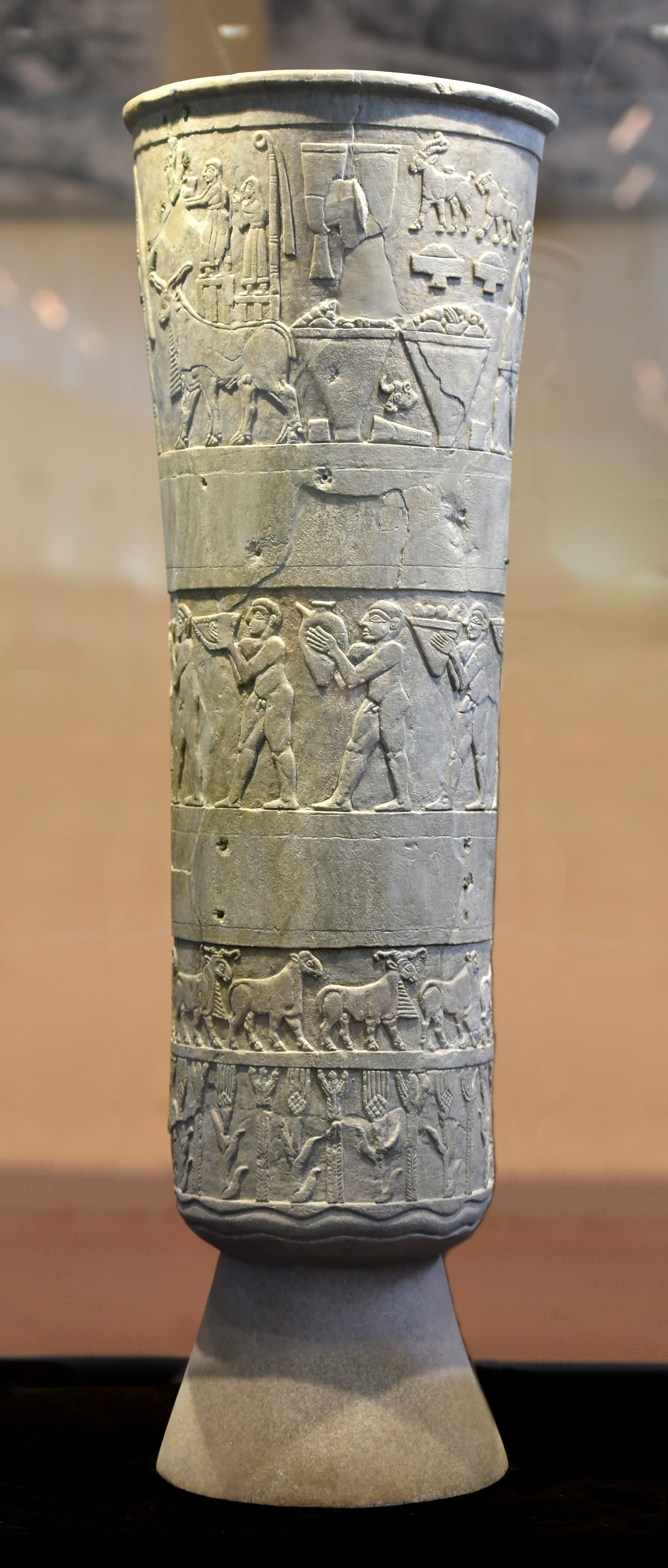
The Warka Vase, back in the museum

A few days later, agents of the FBI were sent to Iraq to search for stolen Museum property. UNESCO organized an emergency meeting of antiquities experts on April 17, 2003, in Paris to deal with the aftermath of the looting and its effects on the global art and antiquities market.

On April 18, 2003, the Baghdad Museum Project was formed in the United States with a proposal to assure the Iraq Museum every possibility of the eventual safe return of its collection, even if that is to take hundreds of years. Rather than focus only on law enforcement and the current antiquities market, the group set its mission as being to (1) establish a comprehensive online catalog of all cultural artifacts in the museum's collection, (2) create a virtual Baghdad Museum that is accessible to the general public over the Internet, (3) build a 3D collaborative workspace within the virtual Baghdad Museum for design and fundraising purposes, and (4) establish a resource center within the virtual Baghdad Museum for community cultural development. Various ancient items believed looted from the museum have surfaced in neighboring countries on their way to the United States, Israel, Europe, Switzerland, and Japan, and even on eBay.

On May 7, 2003, U.S. officials announced that nearly 40,000 manuscripts and 700 artifacts belonging to the Iraq Museum in Baghdad were recovered by U.S. Customs agents working with museum experts in Iraq. Some looters had returned items after promises of rewards and amnesty, and many items previously reported missing had actually been hidden in secret storage vaults prior to the outbreak of war. On June 7, 2003, the U.S. occupation authorities announced that world-famous treasures of Nimrud were preserved in a secret vault in the Iraqi Central Bank. The artifacts included necklaces, plates, gold earrings, finger and toe rings, bowls and flasks. But, around 15,000 and the tiny items including some of the most valuable artifacts on the antiquities markets remain missing.

The museum has been protected since its looting, but archaeological sites in Iraq were left almost entirely unprotected by coalition forces, and there has been massive looting, starting from the early days of the warfare and between summer 2003 and the end of 2007. Estimates are that 400–600,000 artifacts have been plundered. Iraqi sculptor Mohammed Ghani Hikmat spearheaded efforts by the Iraqi artist community to recover artworks looted from the museum. Approximately 150 of Hikmat's pieces were stolen from the museum alone. Hikmat's group has only recovered approximately 100 of the museum's works, as of September 2011.

United States Marine Colonel, and Manhattan Assistant District Attorney Matthew Bogdanos led the search for these stolen artifacts for over five years from 2003. Up to the year 2006 approximately 10,000 artifacts were recovered through his efforts. Antiquities recovered include the Warka Vase and the Mask of Warka.

The Oriental Institute (Chicago) took the very first and most outstanding initiative to inform the rest of the world about the ransacking of the Iraqi Museum's collection during the US-led invasion of Iraq. The institute set up a new webpage (named Lost Treasures from Iraq) on its website on April 15, 2003, just a few days after this plundering, sending a worldwide message about the lost, stolen, or probably "status unknown" artifacts. In addition, the website created a mass mailing list ("IraqiCrisis") about the lost items from the Iraq Museum. However, the pertinent webpage about the looted Mesopotamian artifacts from the Iraq Museum was last updated on April 10, 2008, and then archived. The website seems to not update its information after then. Gradually, many artifacts which were labeled by the Lost Treasure from Iraq website as stolen or status unknown were found to be on display at museums inside Iraq for several years before the US-led invasion of Iraq. In addition, many others were still safe at the Iraq Museum and were not pillaged. This reflects prominent miscommunication and/or disconnection between the pertinent bodies responsible for the storage, registration, and display of these artifacts. As of December 16, 2022, the databases of the Iraq Museum on the Lost Treasures from Iraq appear not to be updated after April 14, 2008, to correct this.

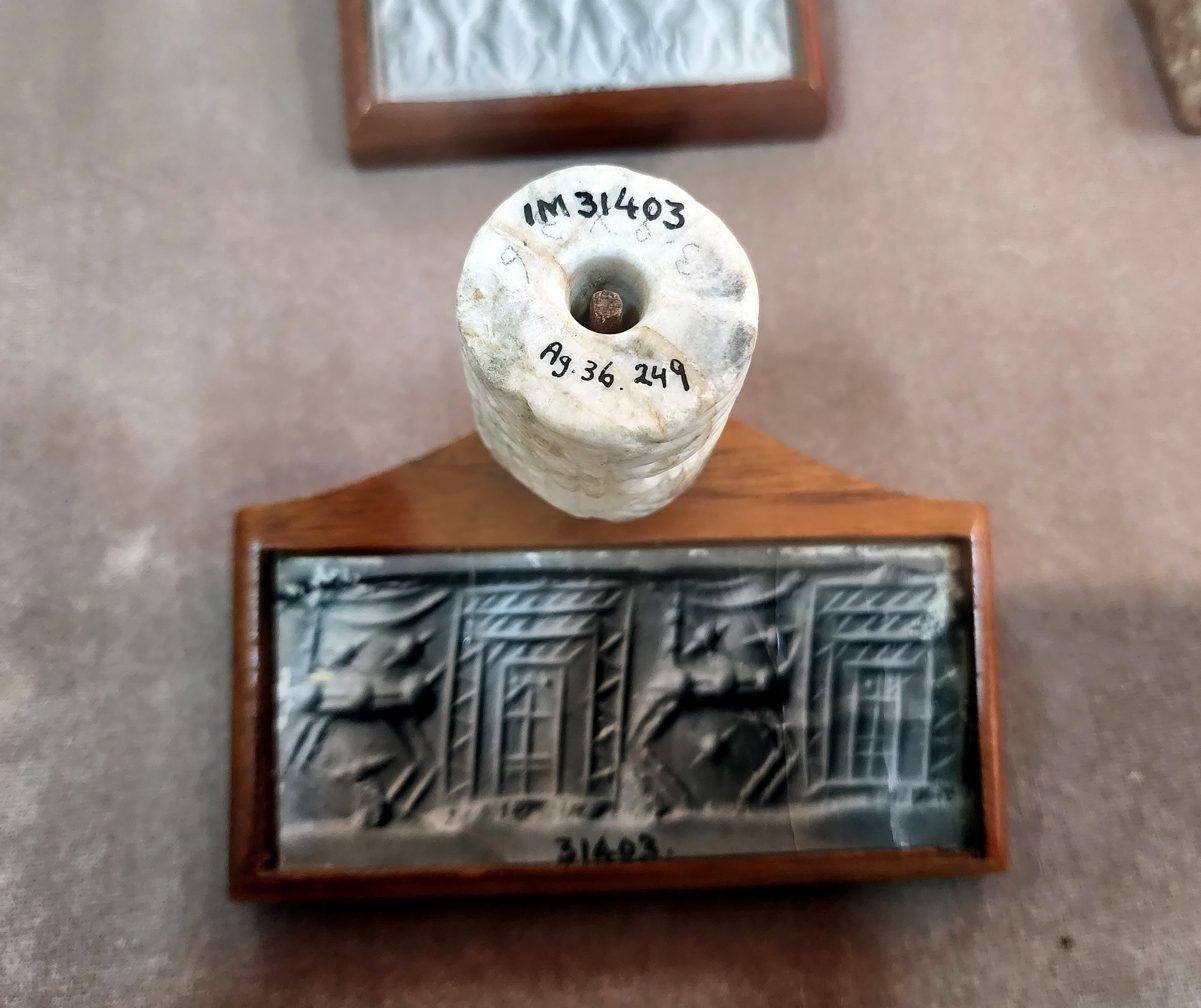
Cylinder seal from Tell Agrab, Iraq, on display at the Sulaymaniyah Museum, Iraq since 1961. The Lost Treasures from Iraq designates it as "feared to be stolen".

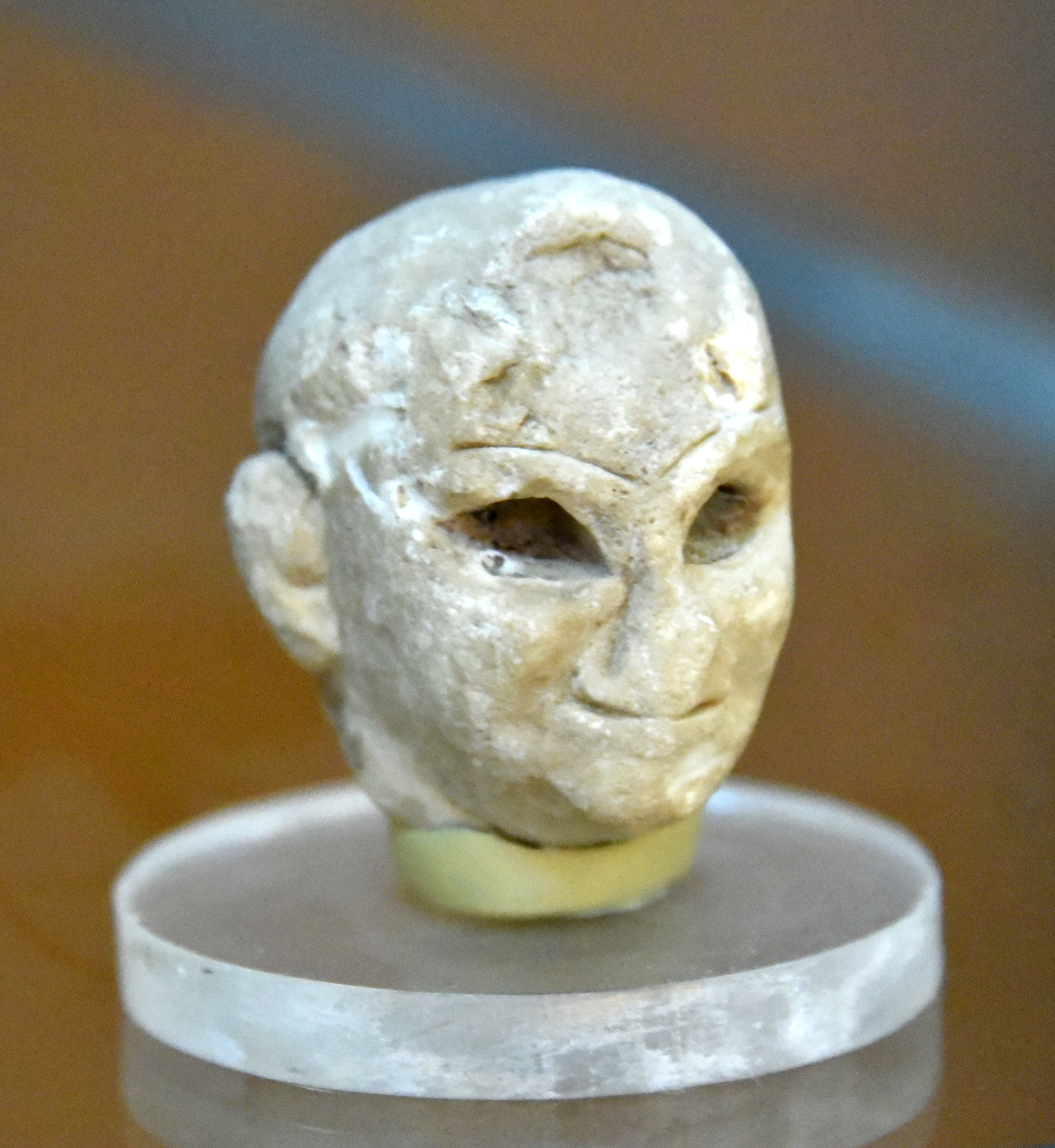
Head of a Sumerian male worshipper from Tell Asmar (Eshnunna), Iraq, on display at the Sulaymaniyah Museum, Iraq since 1961. The Lost Treasures from Iraq designates it as "status unknown".

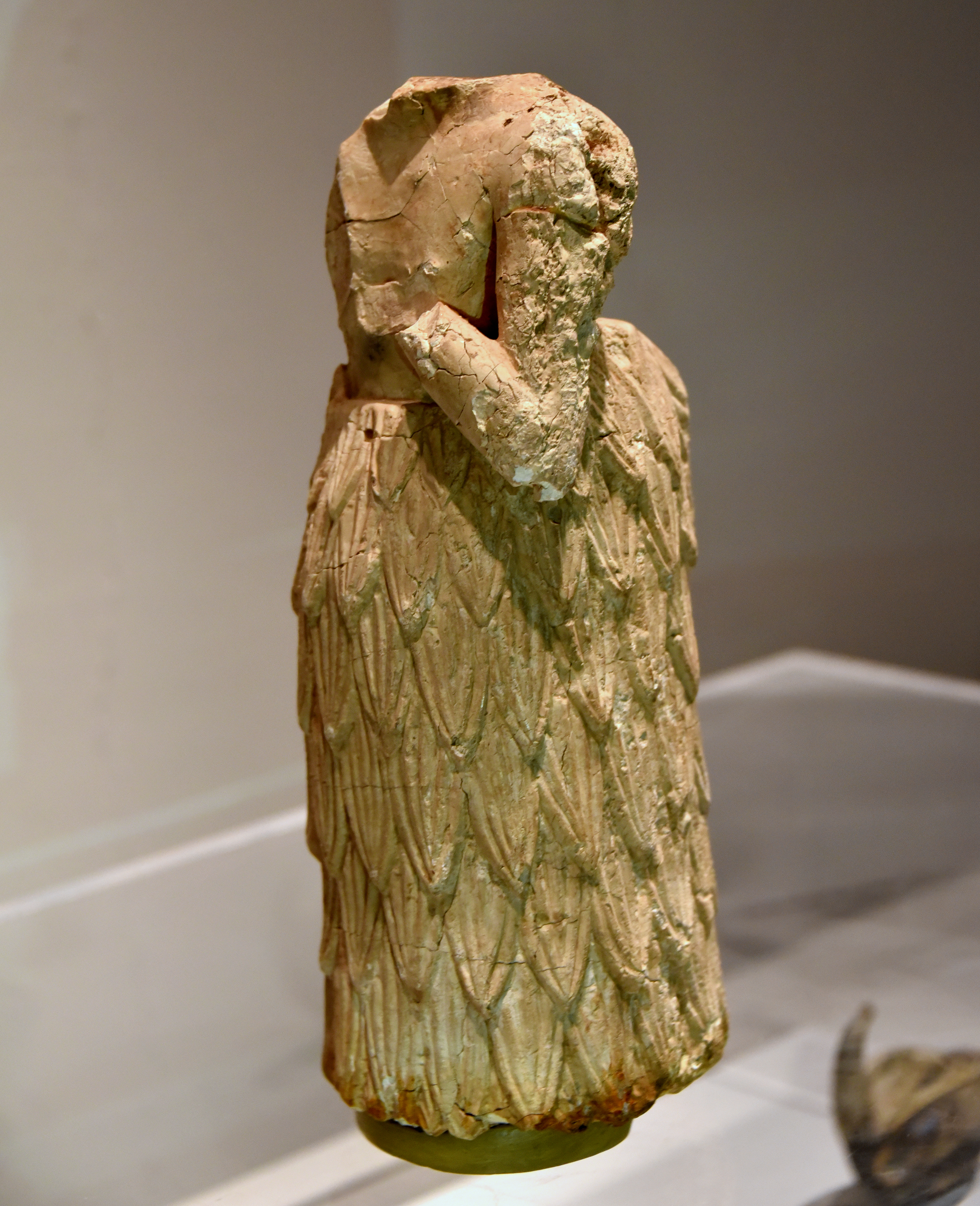
Headless statue of a Sumerian male worshipper, from Khafajah, Iraq, on display at the Sulaymaniyah Museum, Iraq since 1961. The Lost Treasures from Iraq does not mention any status.

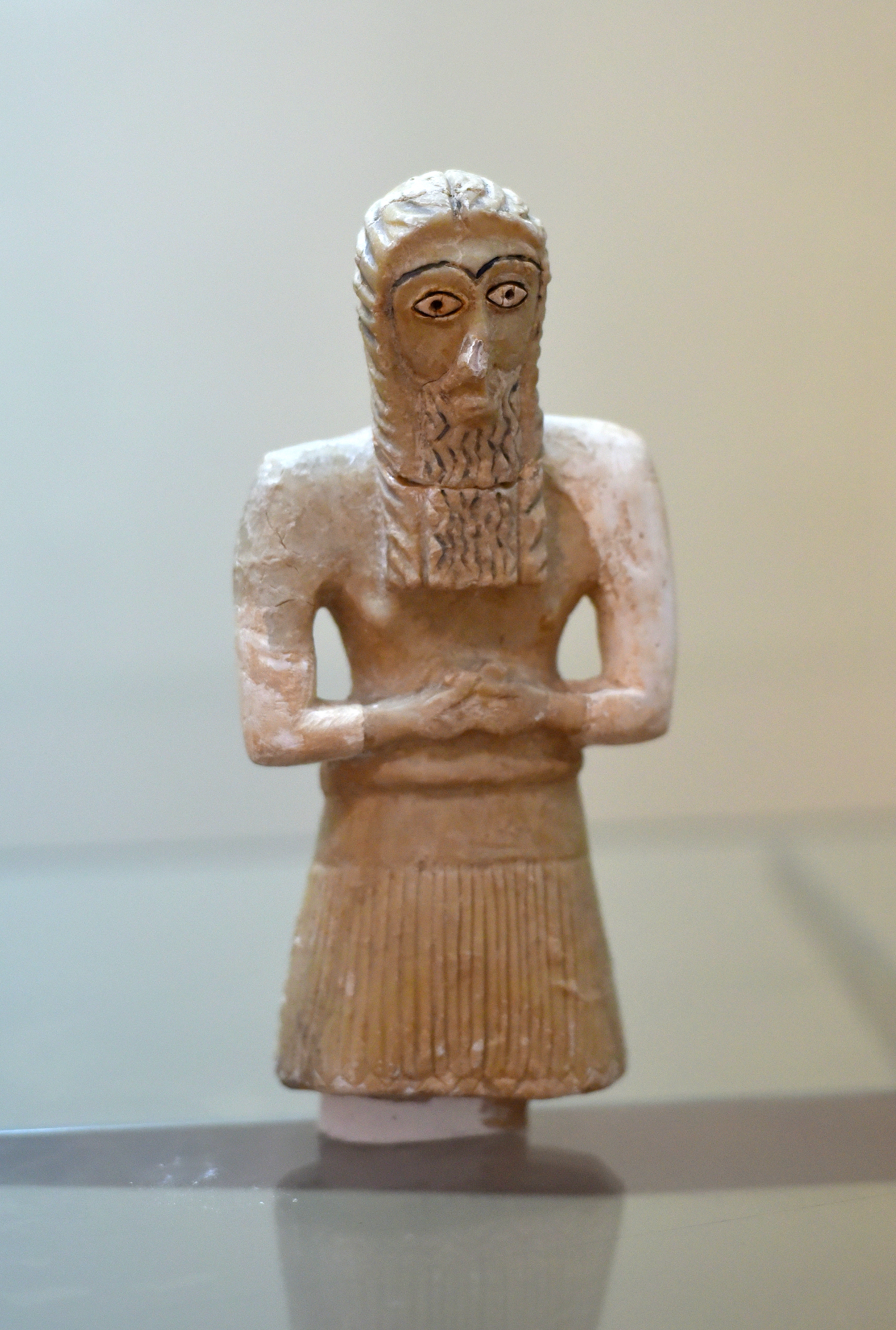
Male Statuette from Khafajah, Iraq. On display at the Iraq Museum. The Lost Treasures from Iraq designates it as "status unknown".

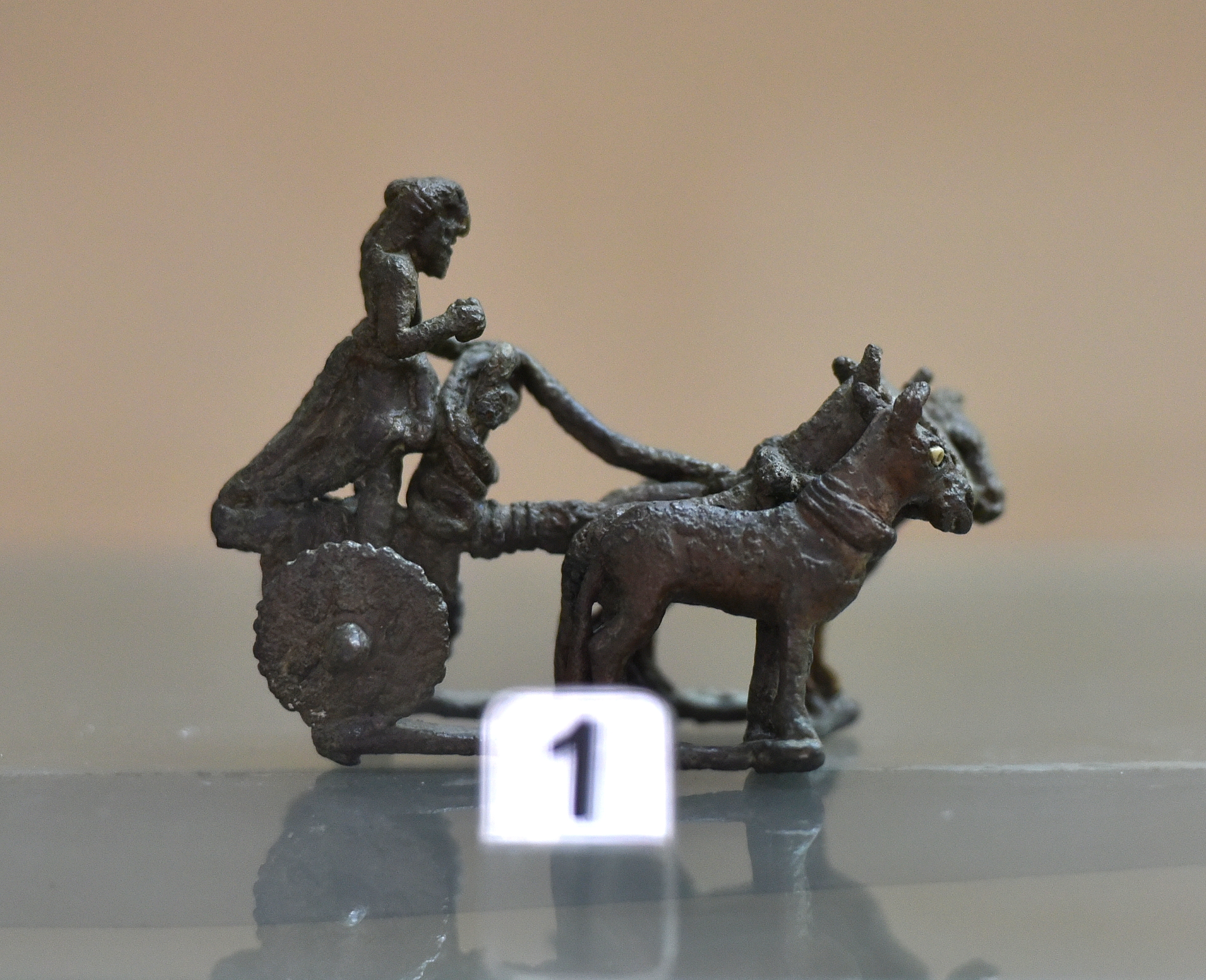
Quadriga from Tell Agrab, Iraq. On display at the Iraq Museum. The Lost Treasures from Iraq designates it as "status unknown".

== Recent work ==
At various Iraq reconstruction conferences, the Baghdad Museum Project gave presentations to the reconstruction community advocating the preservation of Iraq's cultural heritage in rebuilding projects. On August 27, 2006, Iraq's museum director Dr. Donny Youkhanna fled the country to Syria, as a result of murder threats he and his family members had received from terrorist groups that were assassinating all remaining Iraqi intellectuals and scientists. Youkhanna held the position of visiting professor in the anthropology department of Stony Brook State University of New York until his death in March 2011.

On June 9, 2009, the treasures of the Iraq Museum went online for the first time as Italy inaugurated the Virtual Museum of Iraq. On November 24, 2009, Google announced that it would create a virtual copy of the museum's collections at its own expense, and make images of four millennia of archaeological treasures available online, free, by early 2010. It is unclear the extent by which Google's effort overlaps with Italy's previous initiative. Google's Street View service was used to image much of the museum's exhibit areas and, as of November 2011, these images are online.

In 2017, forty ancient Iraqi artefacts drawn from the Iraq Museum and spanning six millennia, from the Neolithic Age to the Parthian Period, were shown alongside contemporary artworks at the Venice Biennale. Most of these objects had never previously left Iraq, excluding a few that were recently recovered after the 2003 lootings of the museum. Commissioned by Ruya Foundation, the exhibition 'Archaic' attracted over 5,500 visitors during the preview week of the 57th Biennale, and was critically acclaimed by the press.

== Reopening ==
The museum opened its doors only sporadically between September 1980, during the Iran-Iraq War, and 2015. After the U.S. invasion and occupation of Iraq, the museum was rarely opened, including an opening on July 3, 2003, for several hours for a visit by journalists and Coalition Provisional Authority head Paul Bremer, as a signal that things were returning to normal. In December 2008, the museum was opened for a photo opportunity for Ahmad Chalabi, who returned a number of artifacts supposedly handed in to him by Iraqis. On February 23, 2009, the museum was opened at the behest of Iraqi prime minister Maliki, to demonstrate that things were returning to normal. Many archaeological officials protested against this opening, arguing that conditions were not yet safe enough to put the museum at risk; the museum's director was fired for airing her objections.

In a ceremony to mark the occasion, Qahtan Abbas, Iraq's tourism and antiquities minister, said that only 6,000 of the 15,000 items looted from the museum in 2003 had been returned. And an estimated 600,000 archaeological pieces were looted by groups and militias allied with the United States since 2003, according to a book published in 2009. In September 2011 Iraqi officials announced the renovated museum will permanently reopen in November, protected by new climate control and security systems. The United States and Italian governments have both contributed to the renovation effort.

On February 28, 2015, the museum was officially reopened by Iraqi Prime Minister Haider al-Abadi. The museum also has items taken from the Mosul Museum, as ISIS has taken it over.

The museum was closed in July 2025 for renovations, with a planned reopening in early 2026. However, as of October 2026 the museum was still closed.

== Recovery ==
On September 7, 2010, the Associated Press reported that 540 looted treasures were returned to Iraq.

638 stolen artifacts were returned to the Iraq Museum after they were located in the office of Prime Minister Nouri al-Maliki.

On January 30, 2012, a 6,500-year-old Sumerian gold jar, the head of a Sumerian battle axe and a stone from an Assyrian palace were among 45 relics returned to Iraq by Germany. Up to 10,000 of the Iraq Museum pieces are still missing, said Amira Eidan, general director of the museum at the time of the recovery.

On August 3, 2021, multiple global news sites reported that the US has returned 17,000 looted ancient artifacts to Iraq, previously part of the collection at the Museum of the Bible.

On March 8, 2023, the Federal Bureau of Investigation returned an ivory and gold leaf furniture piece dating back 7,500 years ago. It was previously on display at the Michael C. Carlos Museum. The museum purchased the artifact in 2006; its provenance records claimed it had previously been bought to the United States in 1969. After FBI agents determined that the records were falsified, the museum handed the artifact over to the FBI in December 2022. The FBI states that this is the first time an artifact looted from the Iraq Museum has been found in the possession of an American museum.

== Gallery ==
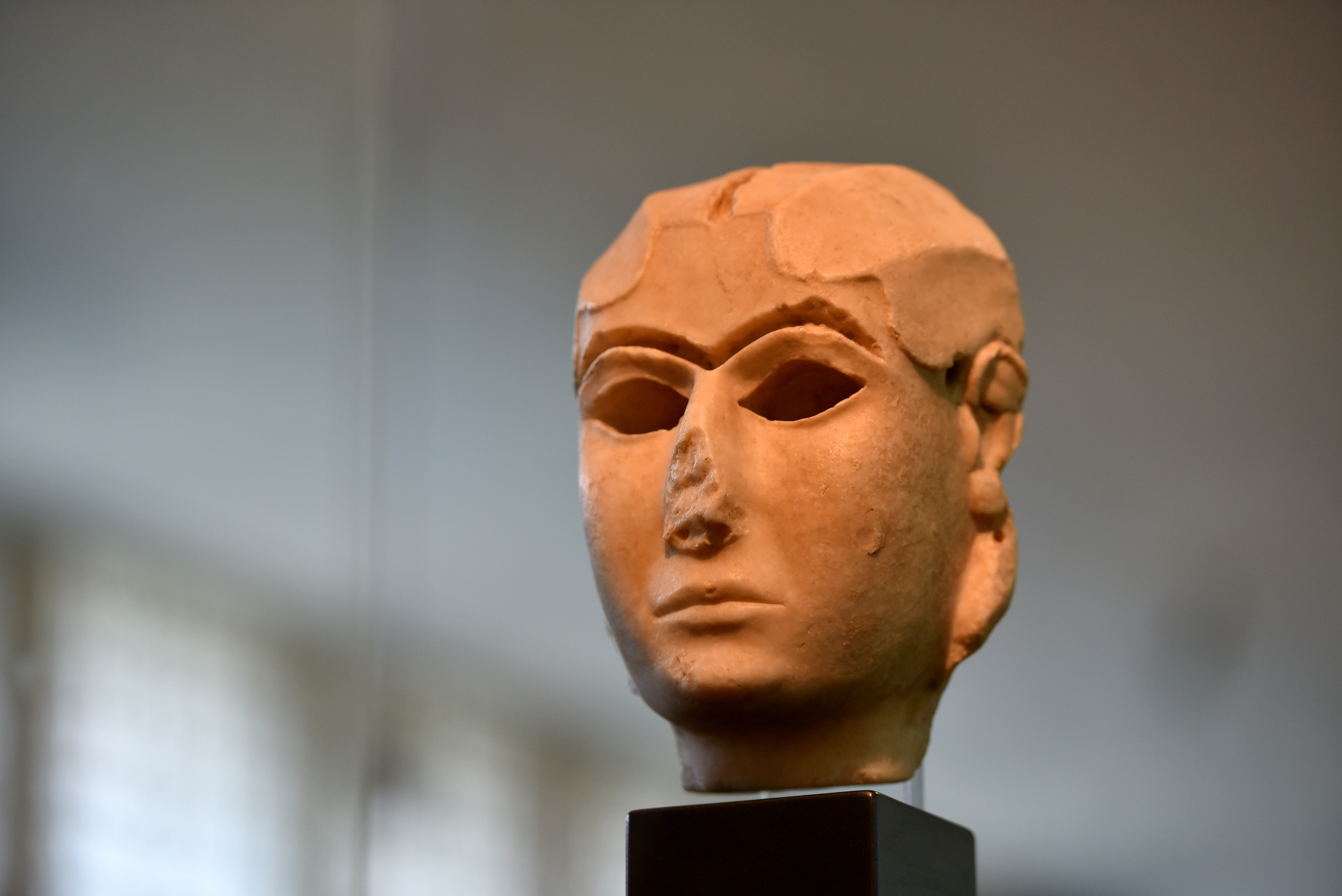
Mask of Warka

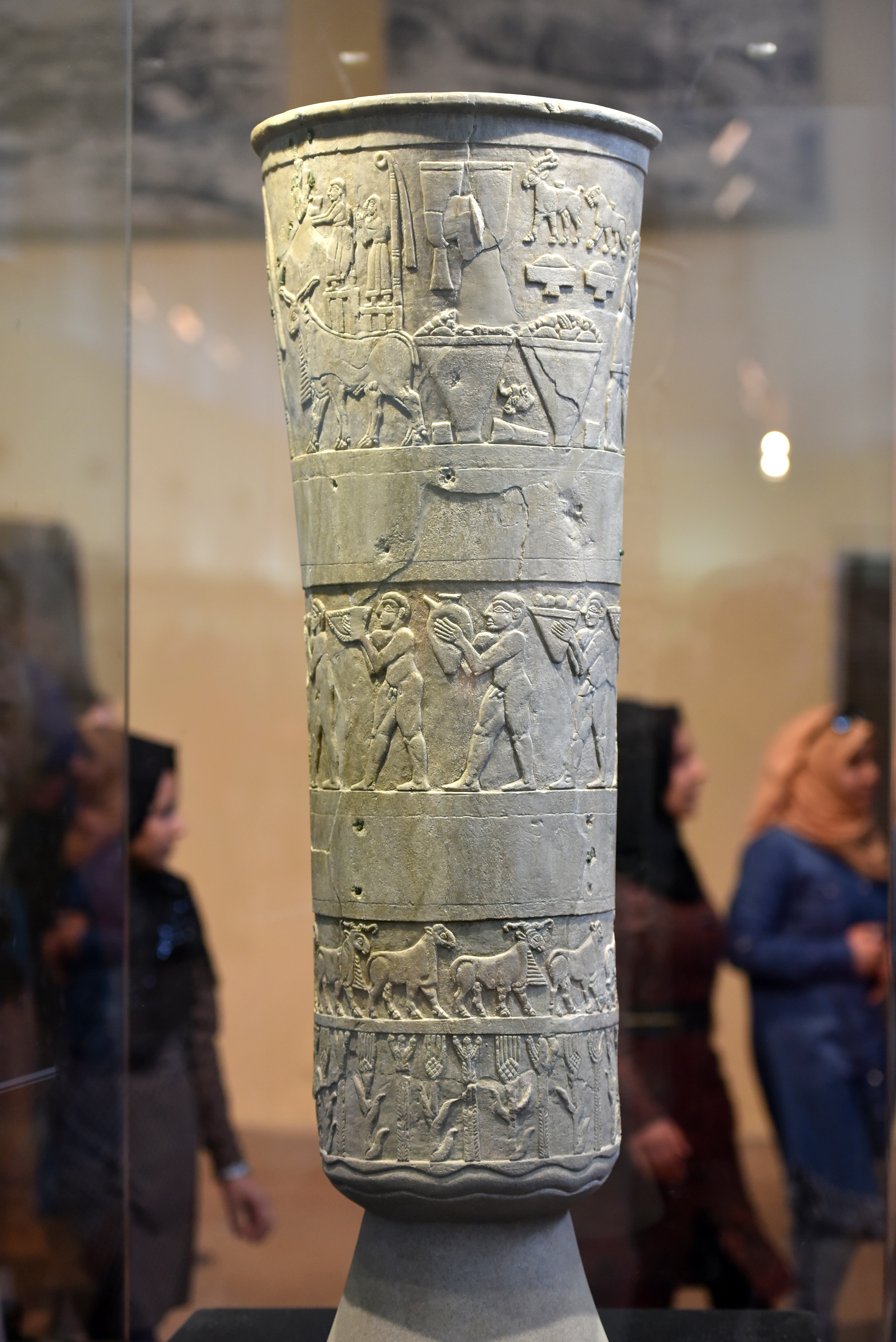
Warka Vase

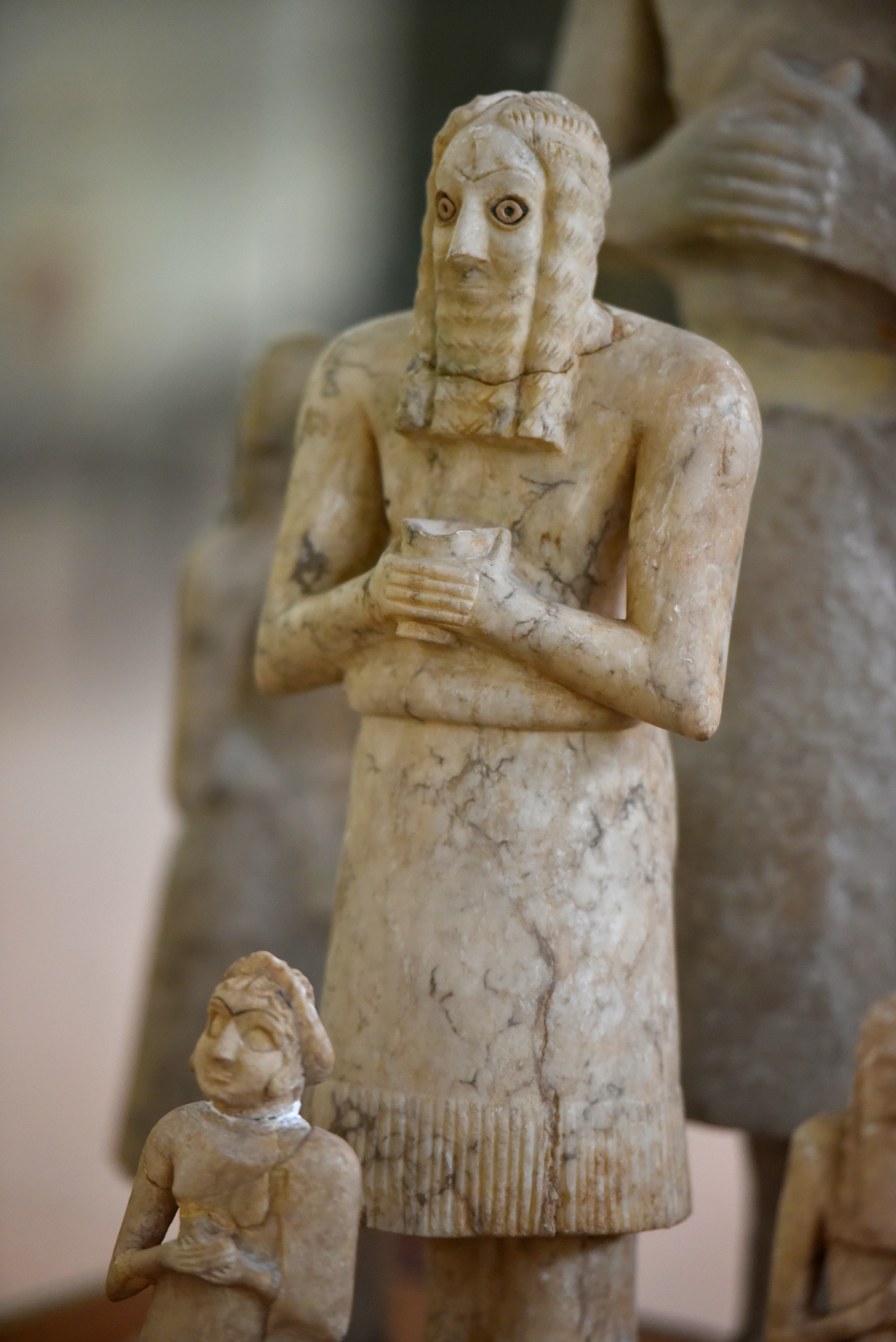
Sumerian worshiper from Tell Asmar

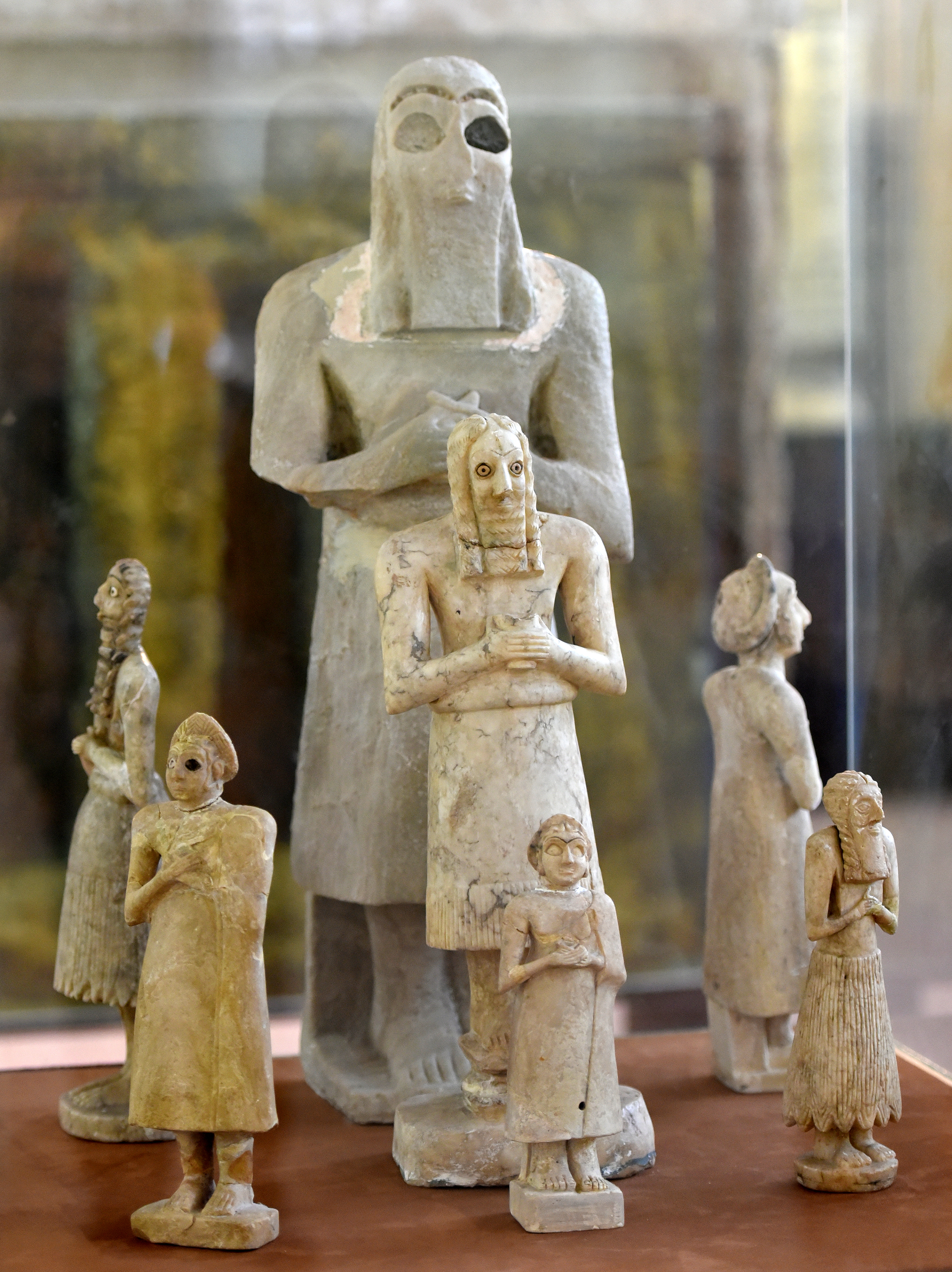
Sumerian Statues from Eshnunna and Khafajah of Diyala region, Iraq Museum

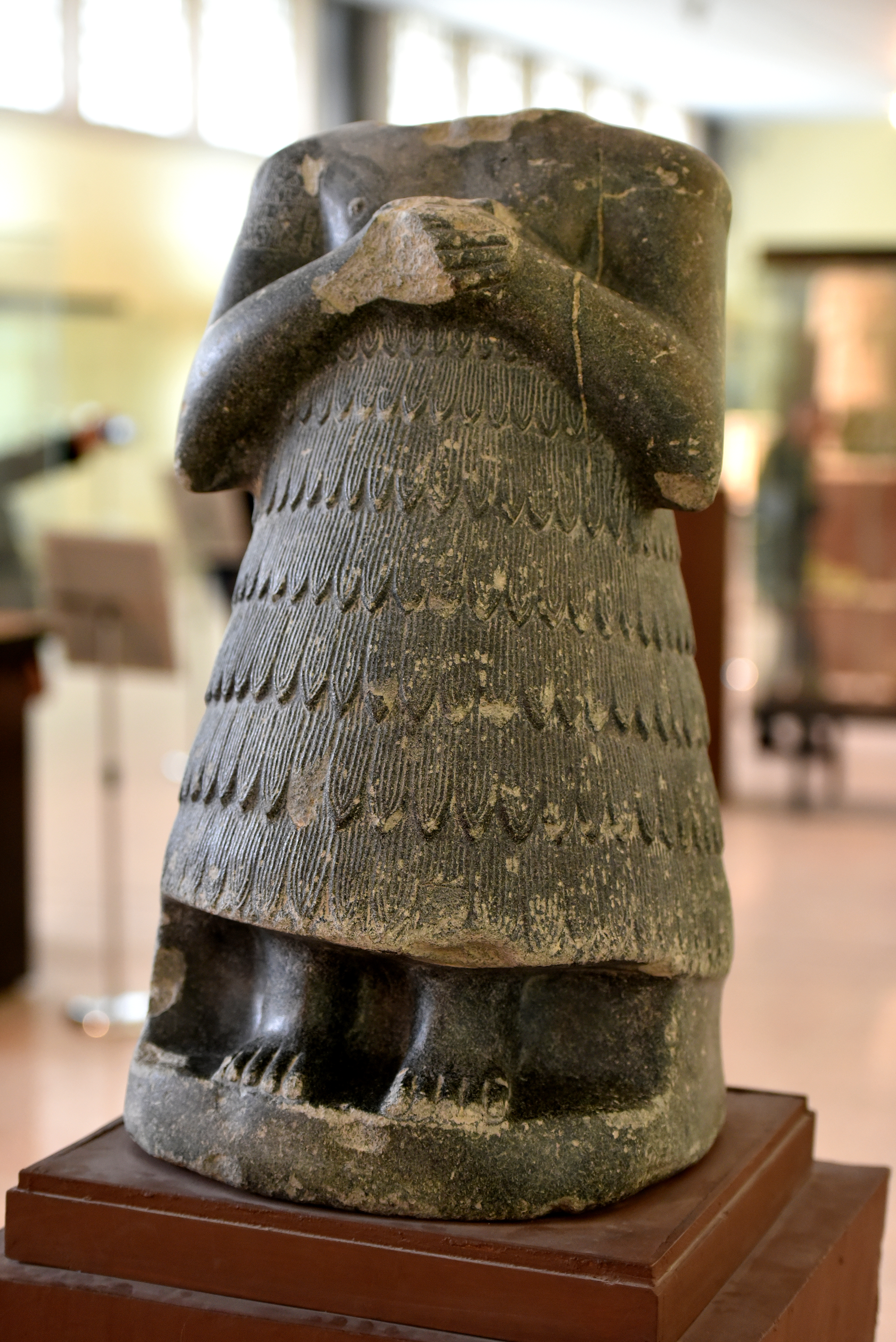
Statue of Entemena

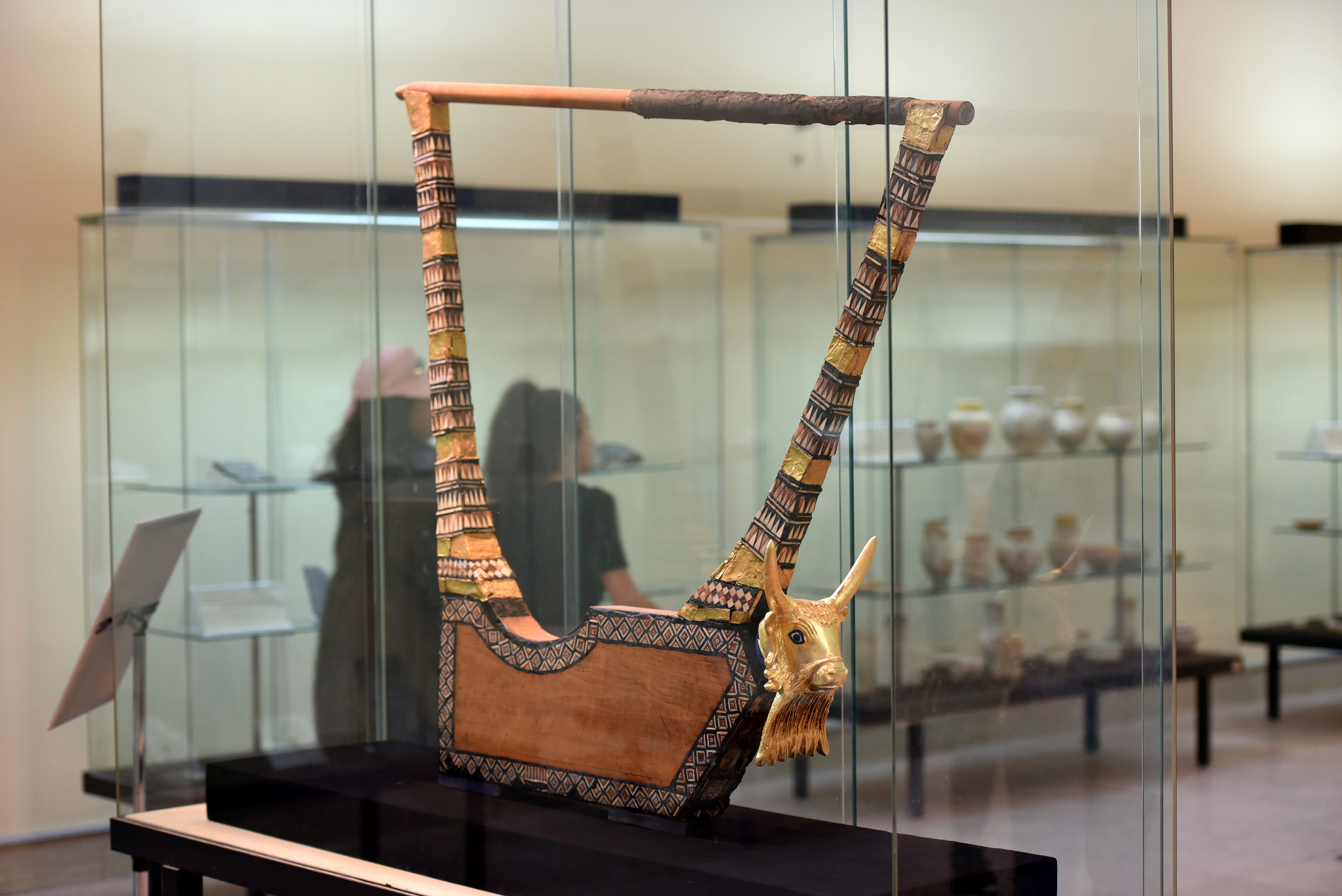
The Great Golden Lyre from Ur

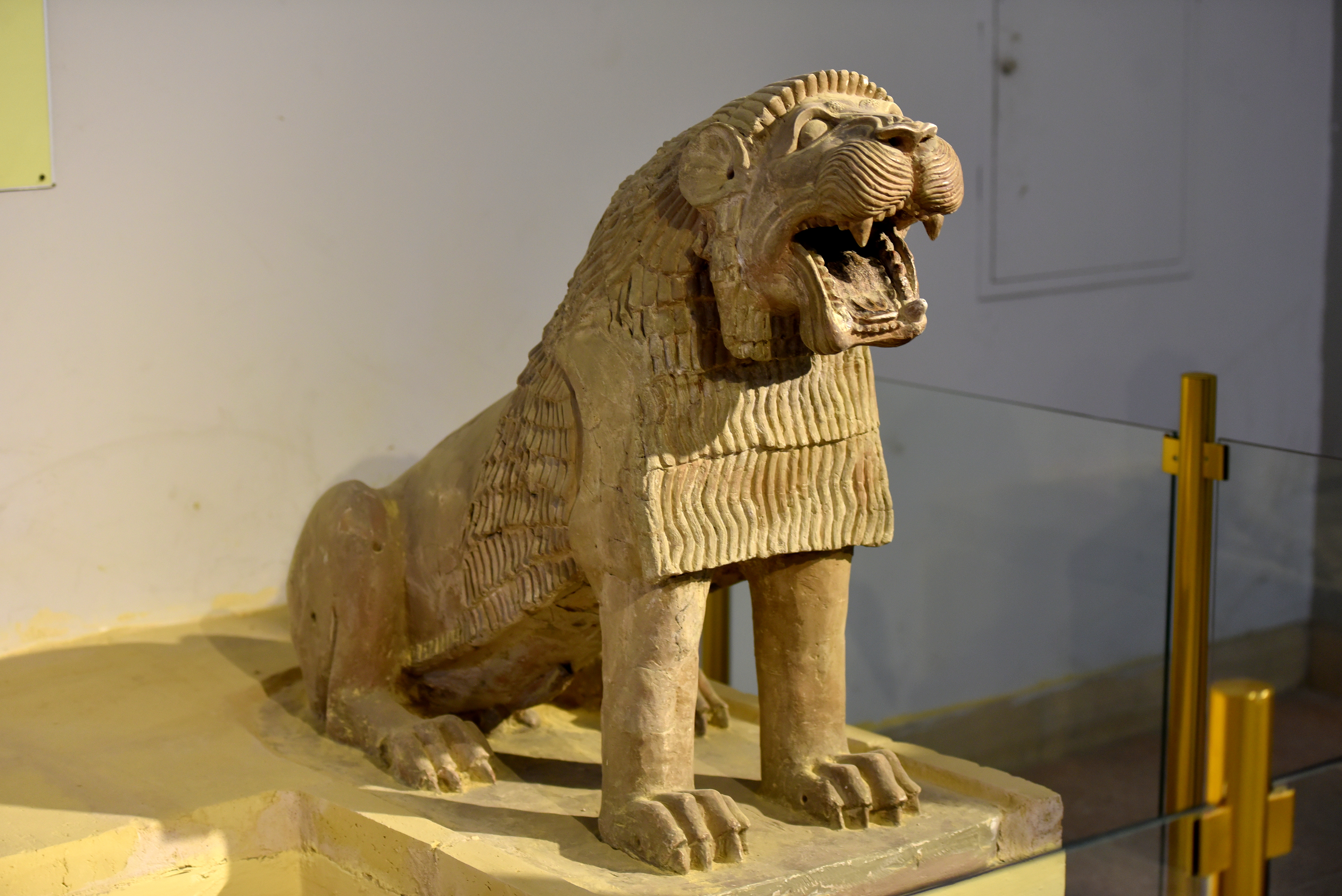
Terracotta lion from Shaduppum (Tell Harmal)

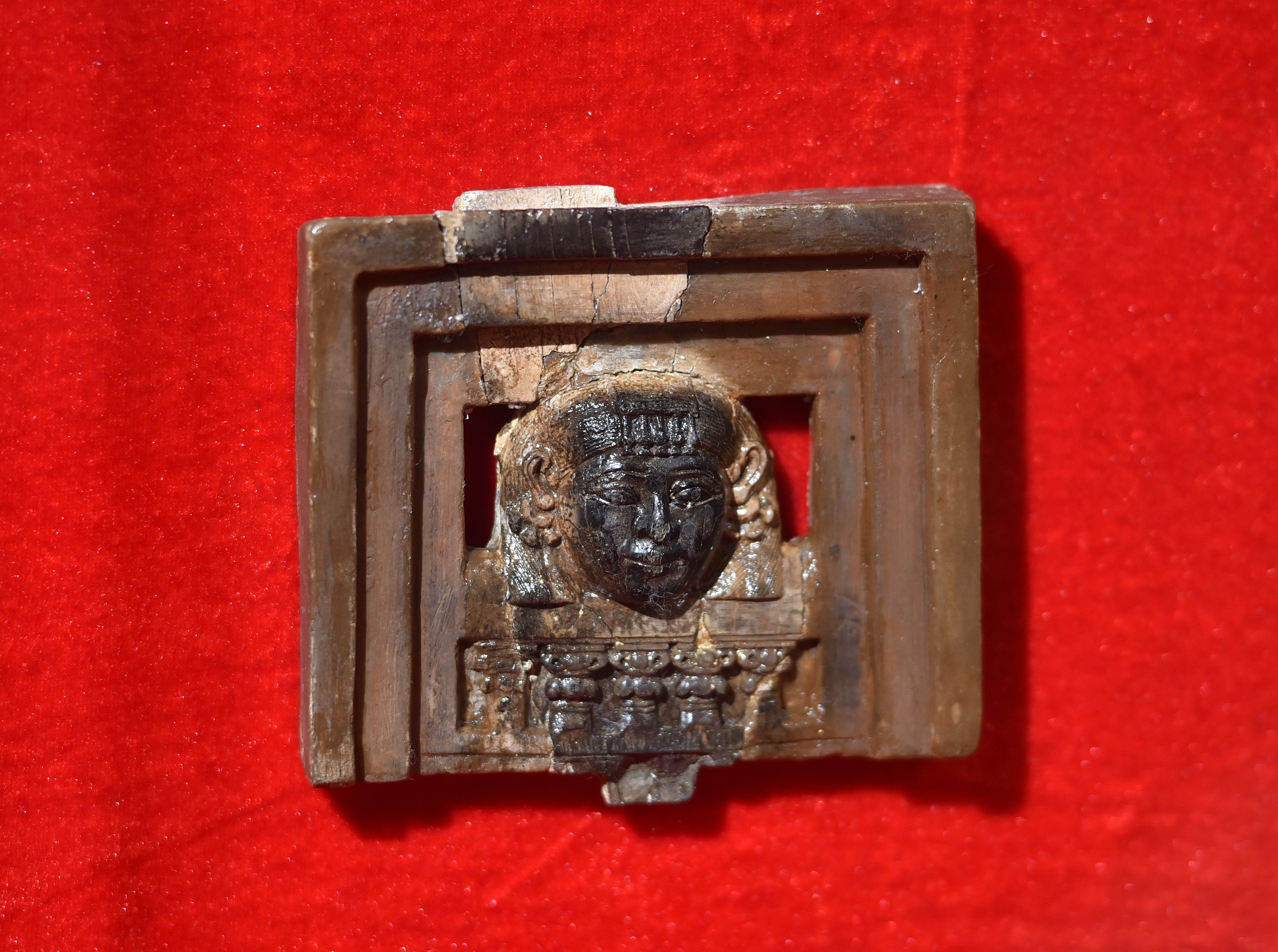
The lady at the window, part of the Nimrud ivories

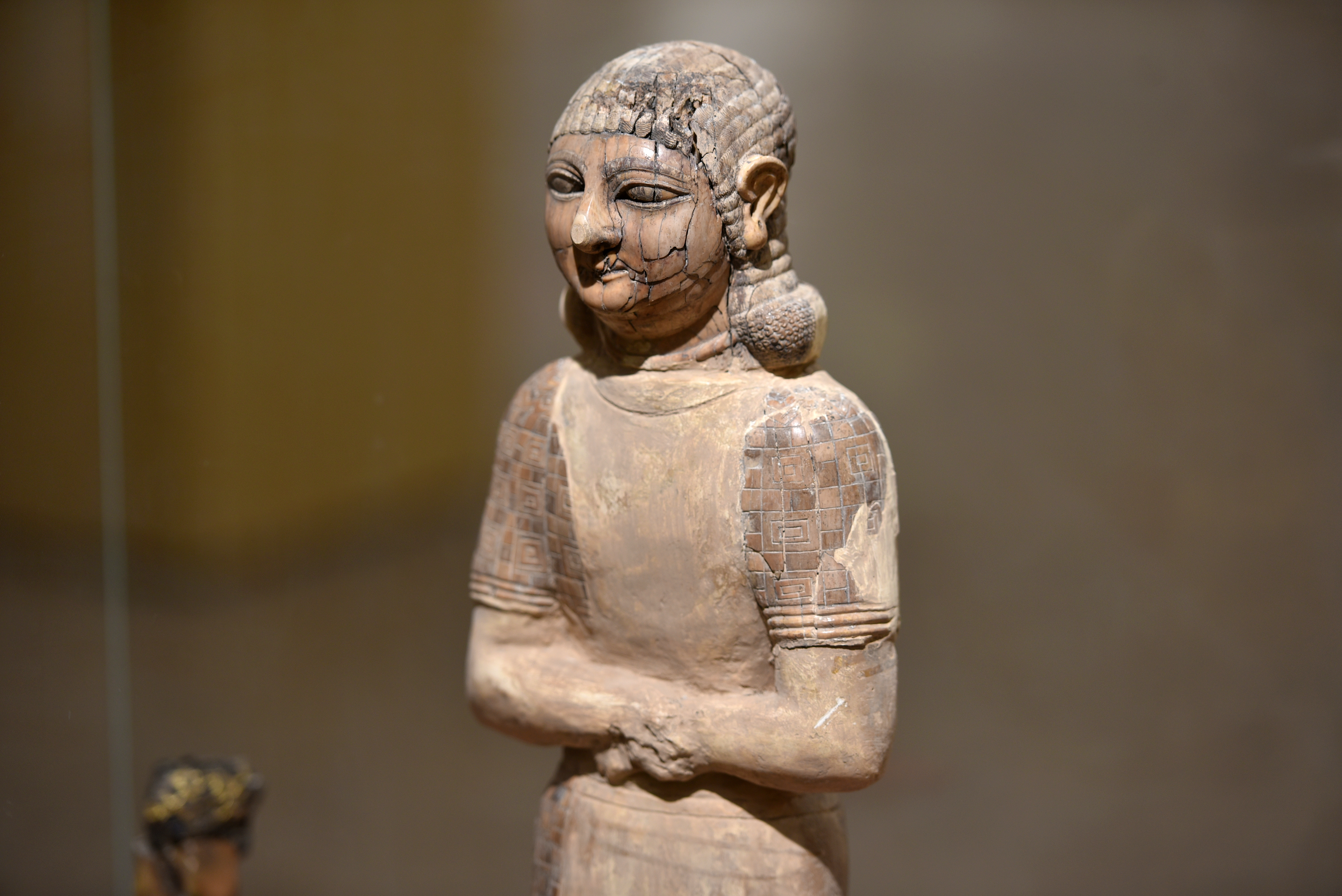
Ivory statuette, part of the Nimrud ivories

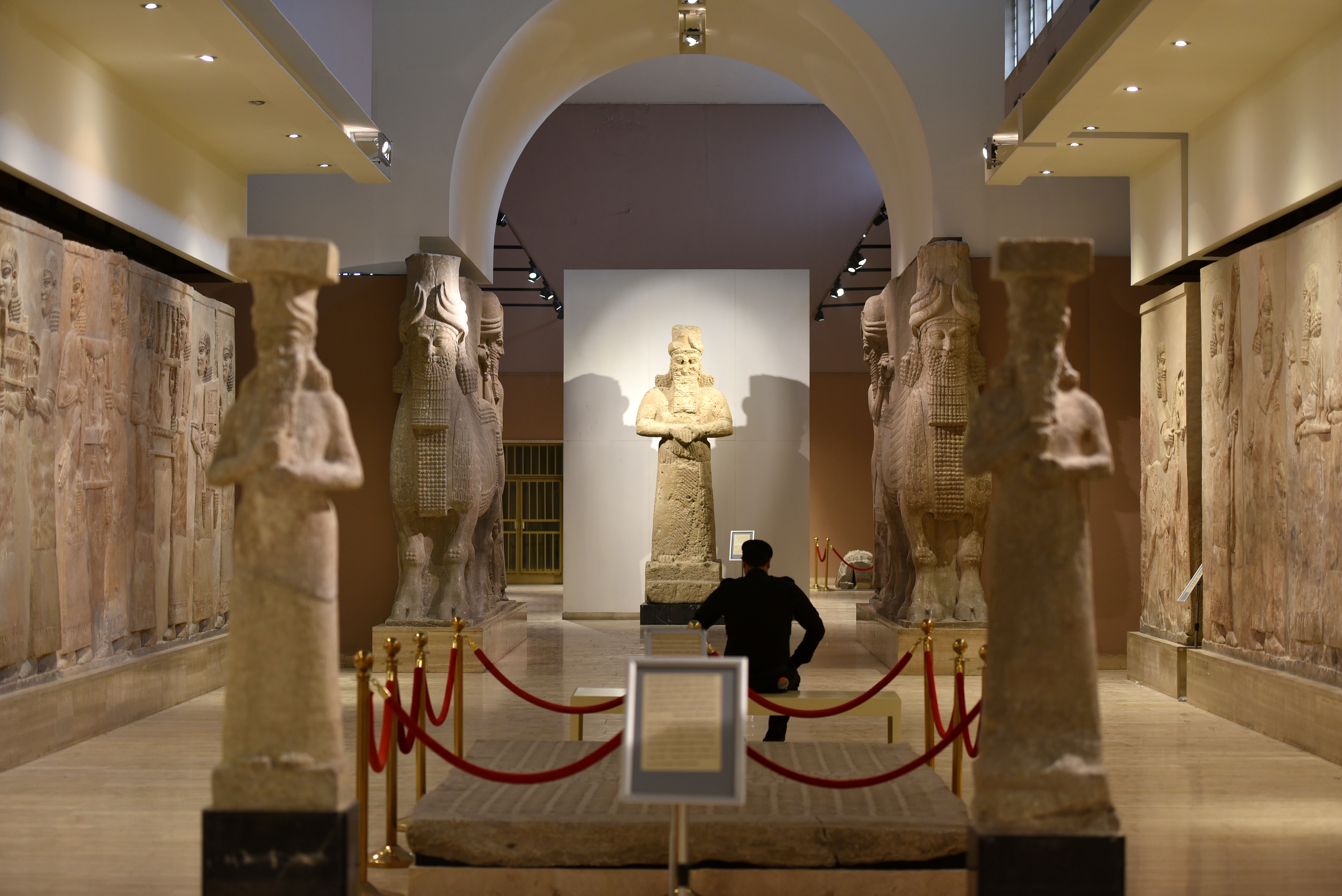
The Assyrian gallery at the Iraq Museum

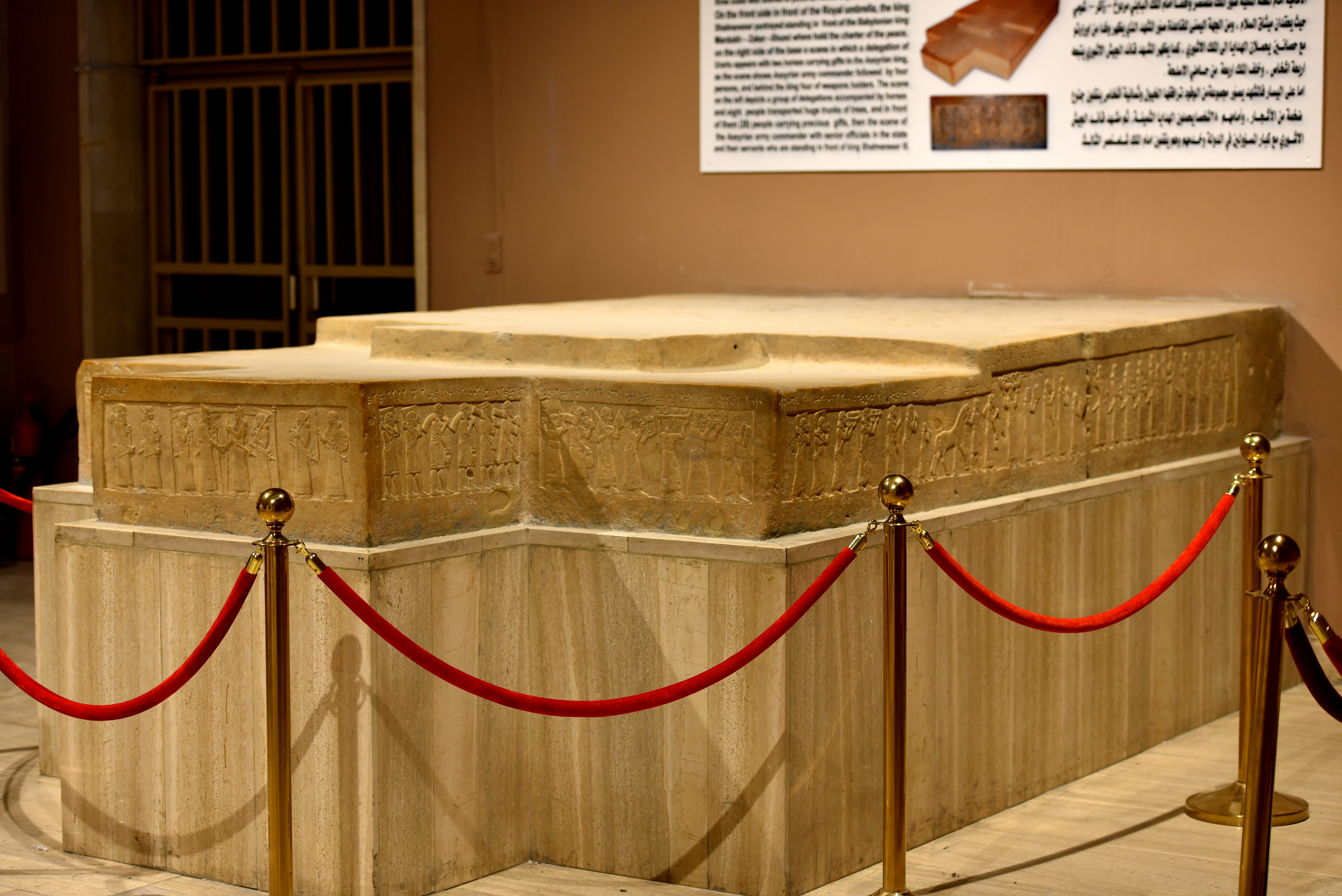
Throne dais of Shalmaneser III from Fort Shalmaneser

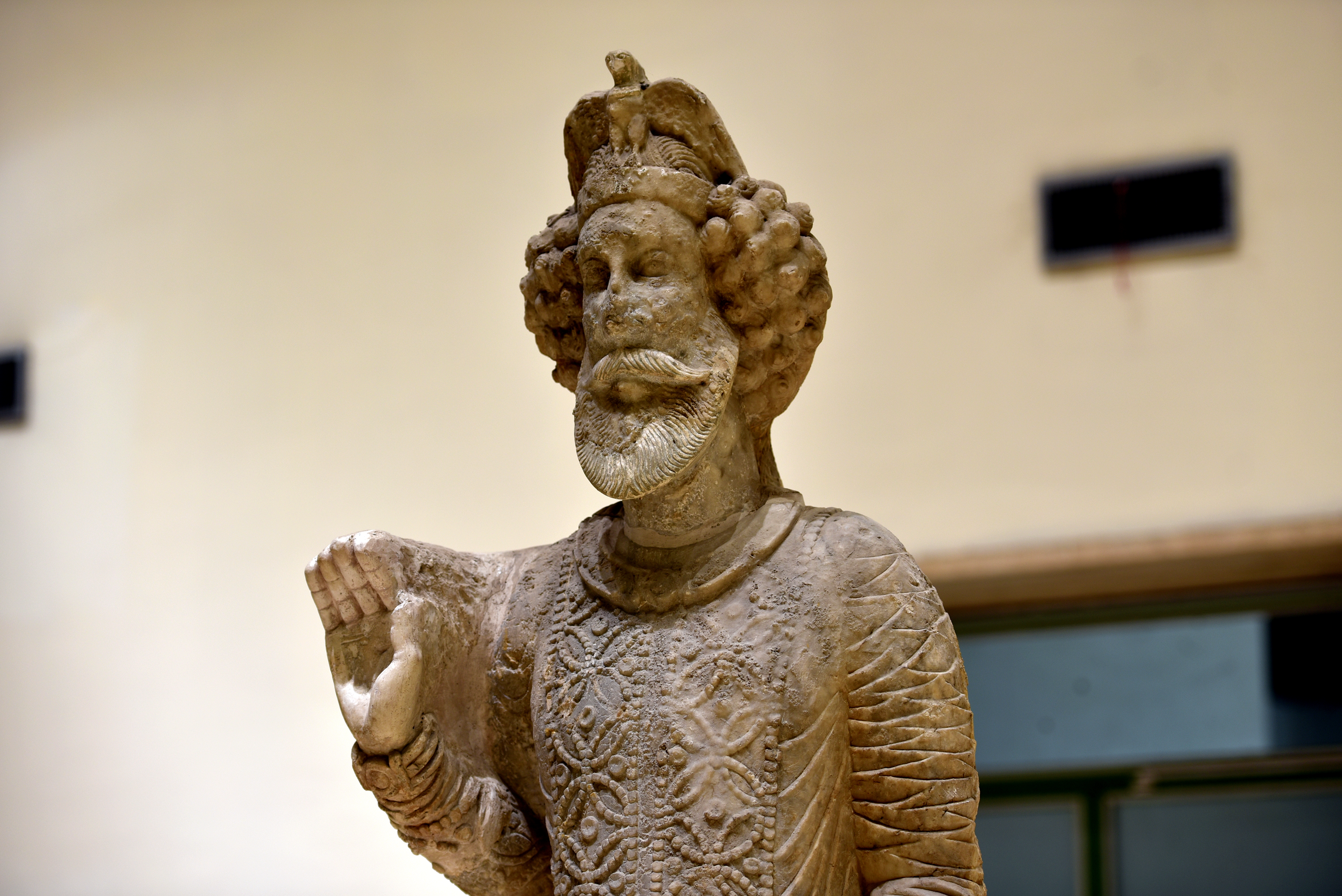
Statue of Sanatruq, king of Hatra

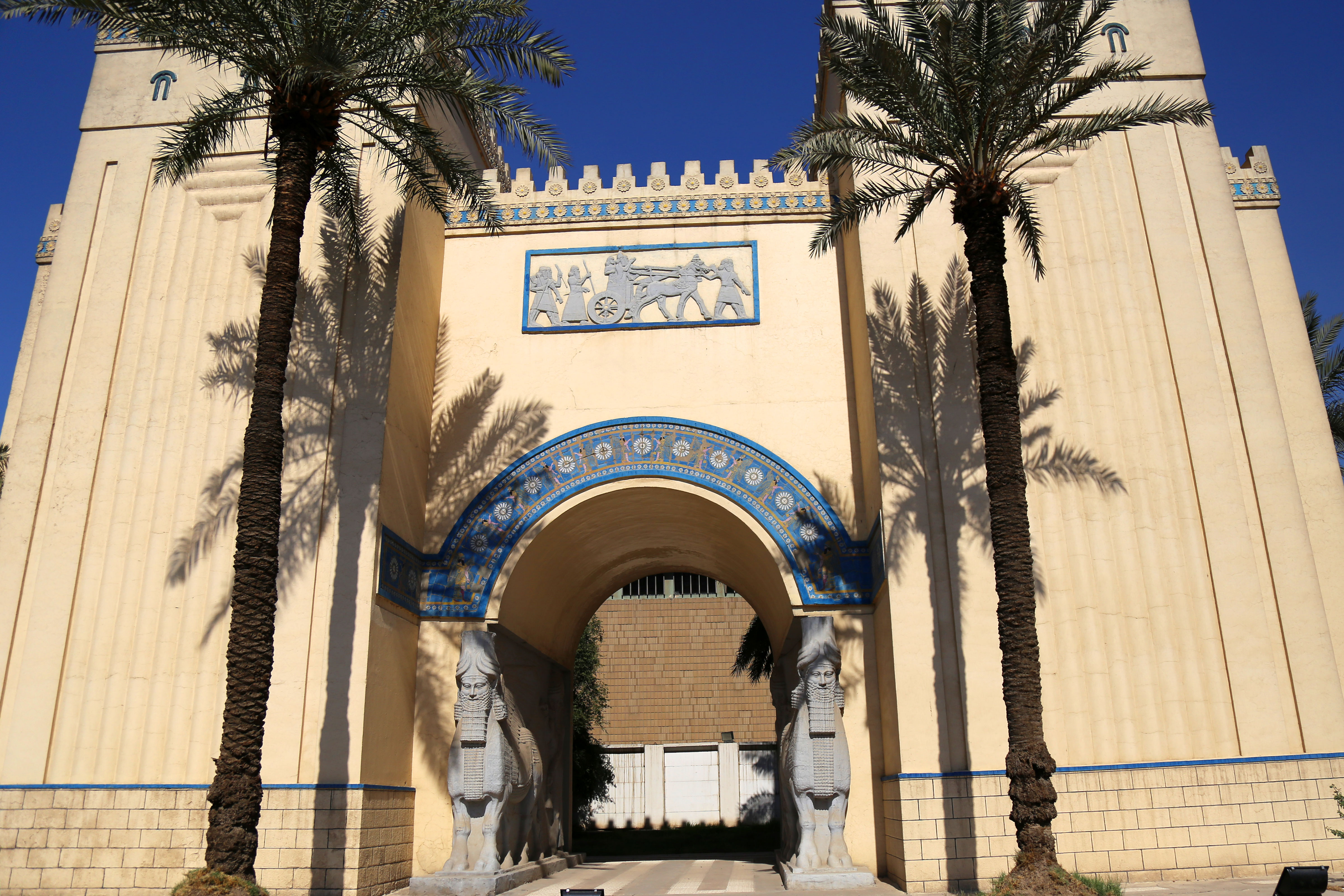
Iraq Museum, Baghdad, Iraq

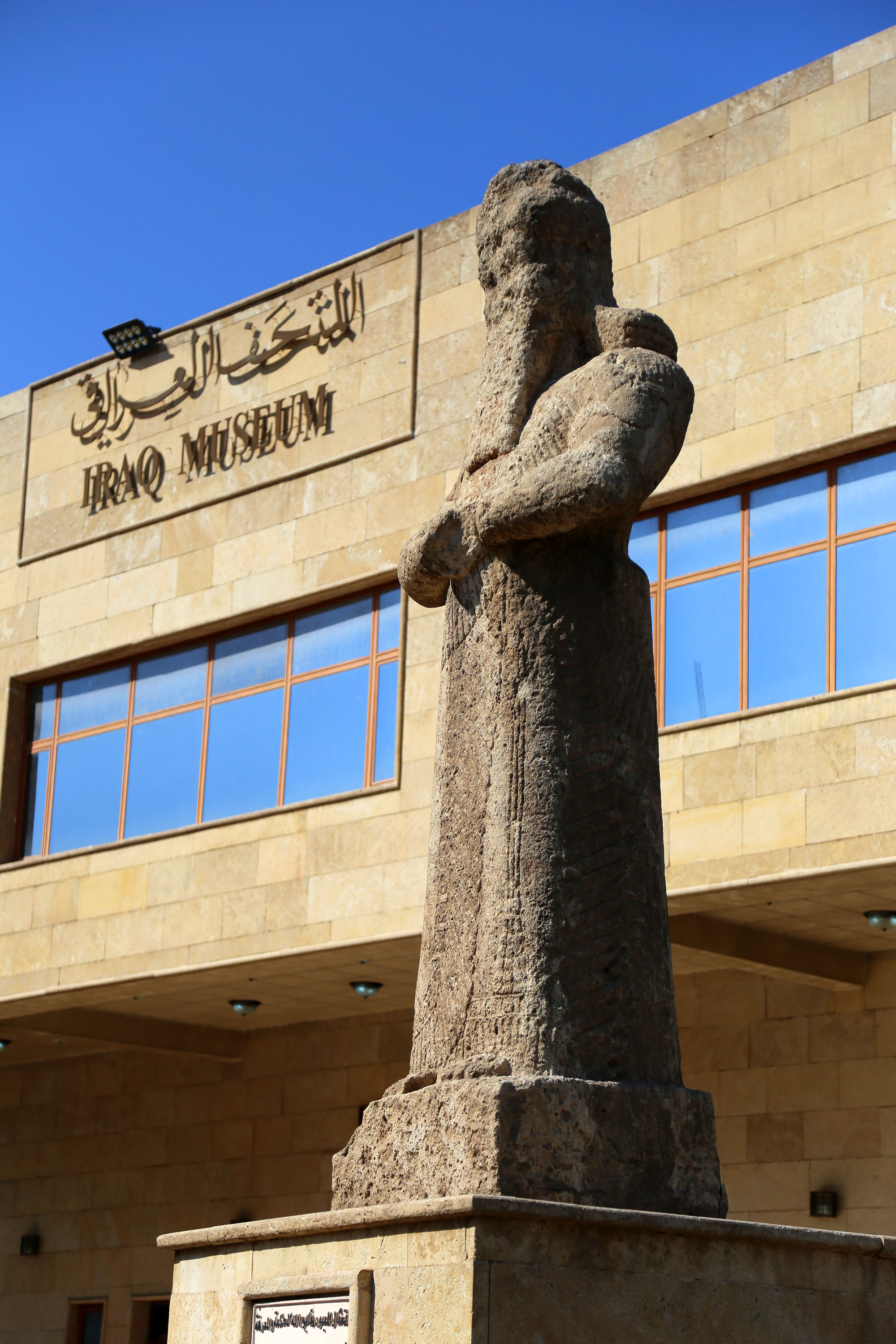
Iraq Museum, Baghdad, Iraq

== See also ==
- Sulaymaniyah Museum
- Erbil Civilization Museum
- Basrah Museum
- Art of Mesopotamia
- List of museums in Iraq
- Lyres of Ur
- Taha Baqir
- Damage to Baghdad during the 2003 Iraq War
- Archaeological looting in Iraq

== News and editorials ==
- Bogdanos, Matthew (June 17, 2009). "Matthew Bogdanos". Conversations with Allan Wolper (Interview). Interviewed by Allan Wolper. WBGO. Archived from the original on January 14, 2017.
- The Ghost in the Baghdad Museum, The New York Times, April 2, 2006, by Roger Cohen.
- Thousands of Iraqi artifacts found, CNN, May 7, 2003.
- Missing Antiquities: Loss Estimates Are Cut on Iraqi Artifacts, but Questions Remain, The New York Times, May 1, 2003.
- Relics: Experts' Pleas to Pentagon Didn't Save Museum, The New York Times, April 16, 2003.
- Antiquities: Curators Appeal for a Ban on Purchase of Iraqi Artifacts, The New York Times, April 16, 2003.
- Hundreds of looted items returned to Iraqi museum, CNN Web Site, November 11, 2003.
- Iraq and Ruin, The Guardian, May 2, 2003, Neal Ascherson interview with Donny George.
- Donny George: A Real-Life Treasure Hunt, Newsweek, March 21, 2005.
