= American Council for Cultural Policy =

Defunct antiquities organization

American Council for Cultural Policy (ACCP) was a not-for-profit organization formed in 2001 by a group of politically influential antiquities dealers, collectors and lawyers in the United States, with its headquarters in New York and representatives in Washington D.C. The goal of the organization was described by Ashton Hawkins as "informing the public on arts issues." The organization is now defunct and its website (culturalpolicycouncil.org) has been removed from the web. Some of its members now actively take part in Cultural Policy Research Institute.

The organization has been famous for its views on heritage issues and advocating the lawful circulation of antiquities in a regulated trade that balances the interests of national heritage, archeological preservation and the international interest in cultural exchange by museum loans and the private market. ACCP's treasurer William Pearlstein has described Middle Eastern cultural heritage laws (especially those of Iraq) as "retentionist" and expressed a desire for the possibility of circulation of licensed exported antiquities.

Some Archaeologists, academics, and cultural heritage lawyers have found these statements worrisome, as the members of ACCP are politically influential figures. Archaeological Institute of America's code of ethics maintain that its members "refuse to participate in the trade in undocumented antiquities and refrain from activities that enhance the commercial value of such objects. Undocumented antiquities are those that are not documented as belonging to a public or private collection before December 30, 1970, when the AIA Council endorsed the UNESCO Convention on Cultural Property, or that have not been excavated and exported from the country of origin in accordance with the laws of that country." (Source: AIA official webpage) It is widely believed by many academics that the trade and collectorship of antiquities fuel the looting and destruction of archaeological sites around the world.

== History and the structure of the group ==
According to published news reports and its own website, the ACCP was directed by Ashton Hawkins, former executive vice-president and Counsel to the Trustees of the Metropolitan Museum of Art. The group had its inaugural meeting with a 45-people Board of Advisers on 9 October 2002. According to an Art Newspaper article (see below), among them were the antiquities collector Shelby White (see Leon Levy), the former Getty curator Arthur Houghton (a vice-president), the former Kimbell Art Museum director Edmund Pillsbury, and the legal scholar Prof John Merryman. Several lawyers from major museums were also there. William Pearlstein was the treasurer of the group and has also represented the National Association of Dealers in Ancient, Oriental and Primitive Art.

Ashton Hawkins, former lawyer of the Metropolitan Museum of Art and current president of ACCP was reported in the Art Newspaper article as stating the following: "We believe that legitimate dispersal of cultural material through the market is one of the best ways to protect it. We're interested in the protection of culture as much as the protection of legitimate collecting.".

The ACCP's board of directors included President Ashton Hawkins, Vice President Arthur Houghton, Treasurer William Pearlstein, Educational coordinator Kate Fitz Gibbon and Secretary Arielle P. Kozloff.

== American invasion of Iraq and activities of ACCP ==
The council appeared in the forefront of cultural heritage protection debates during the American 2003 invasion of Iraq. A 2003 article in Science discussed Ashton and Pearlstein's advocacy for "liberalization" in the issuance of foreign-dig permits in Iraq and reconsideration of Iraqi cultural heritage laws to allow “some objects [to be] certified for export." On ACCP's activities concerning Iraqi cultural heritage, Zainab Bahrani's article "Looting and Conquest" took a critical counter-position. Bahrani wrote that “William Pearlstein, of the American Council for Cultural Policy (ACCP), an organization that met with the White House and the Pentagon right before the [Iraq] war and right after the looting [of the National Museum of Iraq], is appealing for the cultural theft to continue by other means, calling Iraq's antiquities-preservation laws "retentionist," and saying he "hoped that Iraq would grant more excavation permits and consider export permits for redundant objects." She added that such “opportunism opens the door to more cultural and historical plunder, a base scramble much like the parceling off of sites and antiquities that occurred in the nineteenth century.”

== Publications ==
ACCP Advisory Board member Kate Fitz Gibbon, who served on the Cultural Property Advisory Committee to the US President from 2000—2003, has recently edited a book entitled Who owns the past: Cultural Policy, Cultural Property, and the Law (Rutgers University Press 2005), which mostly features contributors affiliated with ACCP (e.g. William Pearlstein, Shelby White, Kate Fitz Gibbon etc.), and intends to propagate the legitimacy of "the ability of museums and private collectors [in the US] to own art from other countries" in the public opinion. Jean M. Borgatti (Clark University) published a favorable account of this book on H-Net reviews. According to Borgatti, the book in the overall sense critiques what they call "retentive cultural nationalisms" of "source-nations" who insist that archaeological artifacts should remain in the country of origin. The authors of the book present themselves as "cultural internationalists" who consider ancient artifacts as works of art that need to be circulated (in the antiquities market, Western museums, among Western collectors) to promote a "cultural understanding".

Cultural property is internationally protected by the Hague Convention for the Protection of Cultural Property in the Event of Armed Conflict and the UNESCO Convention on the Means of Prohibiting and Preventing the Illicit Import, Export and Transfer of Ownership of Cultural Property.
