= Qarachatan =

Village in Kurdistan Region of Iraq

Qarachatan قەرەچەتان
- Village
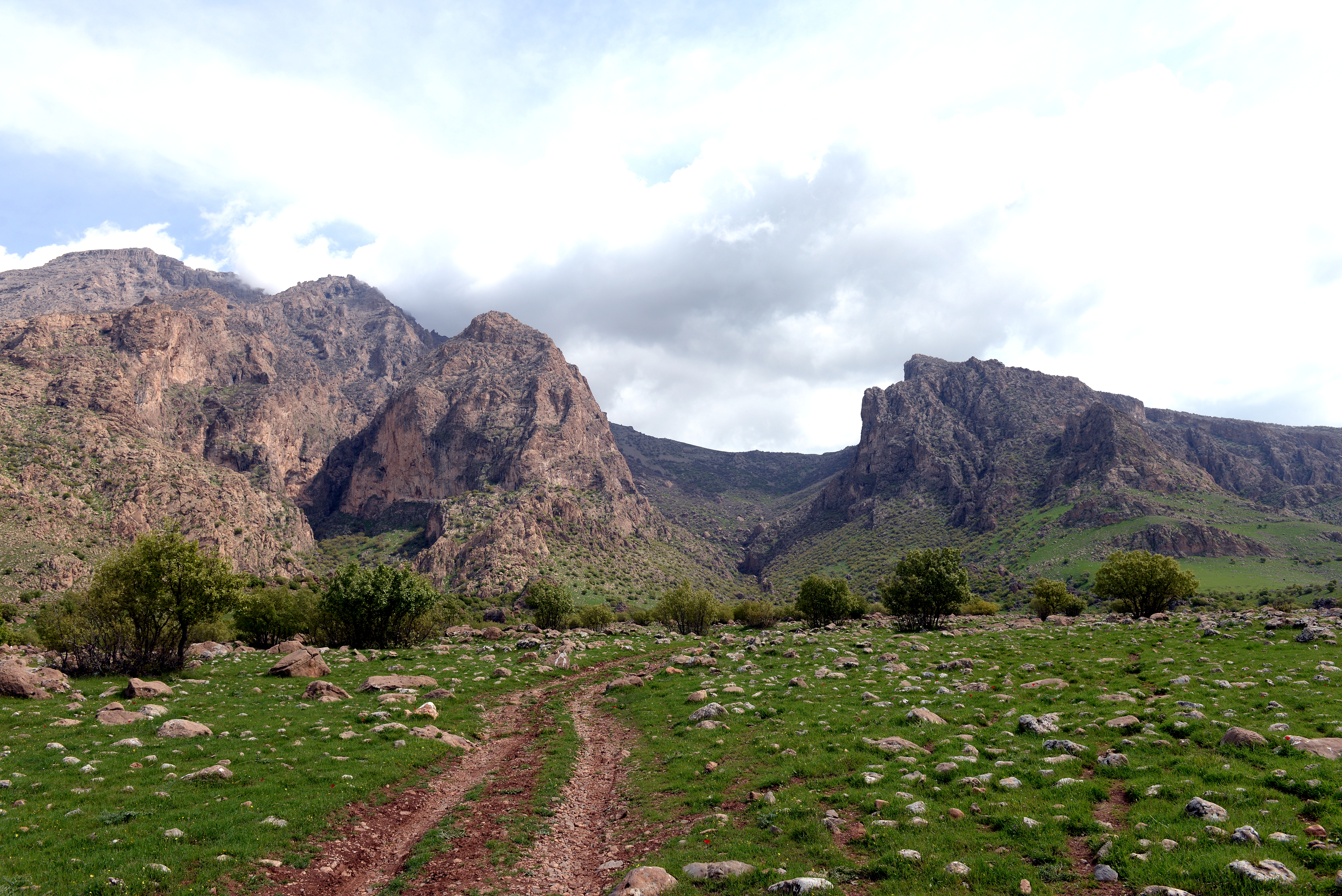
- Rabana and Merquli mountains near Qarachatan
- Interactive map of Qarachatan
- Location of Qarachatan in the Kurdistan Region Qarachatan (Iraqi Kurdistan)
- Coordinates: 35°44′40.74″N 45°11′41.92″E
- Country: Iraq
- Region: Kurdistan Region
- Governorate: Sulaymaniyah Governorate
- District: Dokan District
- Elevation: 2,895 m (9,498 ft)

Population (2020)
  - Total: 155
- Time zone: UTC+3 (AST)

Qarachatan (Kurdish: قەرەچەتان) is a Kurdish village located at the foot of Mount Piramagrun in the Sulaymaniyah Governorate of the Kurdistan Region in Iraq. Qarachatan is renowned for its archaeological significance, particularly the Rabana-Merquly site, a major regional center of the Parthian Empire. Situated on the western flank of Mount Piramagrun, the Parthian-era complex at Rabana-Merquly consists of two settlements linked by an extensive network of perimeter fortifications.

One of the most significant archaeological discoveries in Qarachatan is the Stela of Iddi-Sin, King of Simurrum. Dating back to the Old-Babylonian Period, the Stela is currently on display at the Sulaymaniyah Museum.

Notable individuals from Qarachatan include Karim Sharif Qarachatani, a psychologist, television personality, and author renowned for hosting talk shows. Karzan Kardozi, a filmmaker best known for the film Where Is Gilgamesh?, is another prominent figure from the region.

As of 2020, the population of Qarachatan is estimated to be around 155 residents.

== Gallery ==
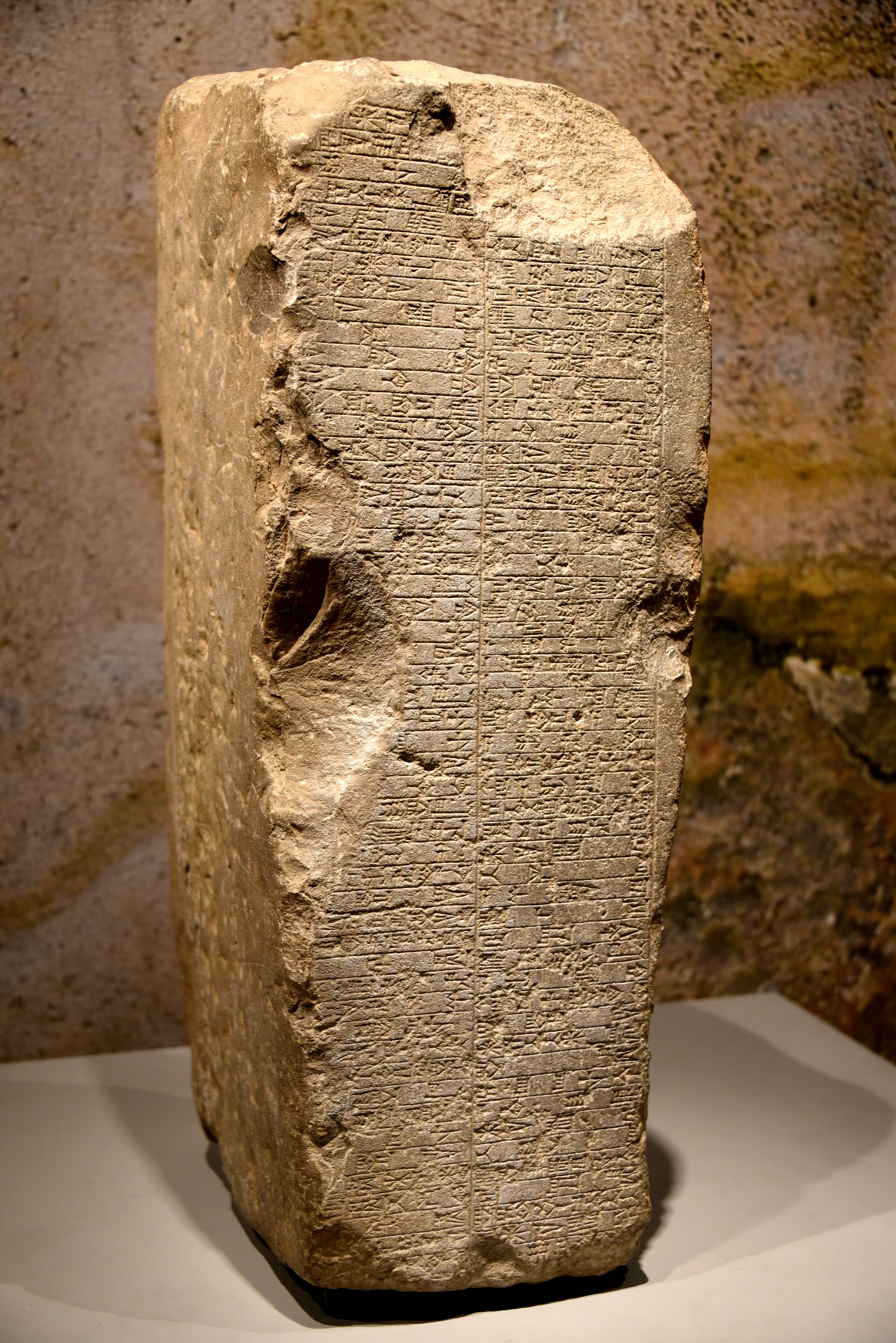
Stela of Iddi-Sin, King of Simurrum, Old-Babylonian Period

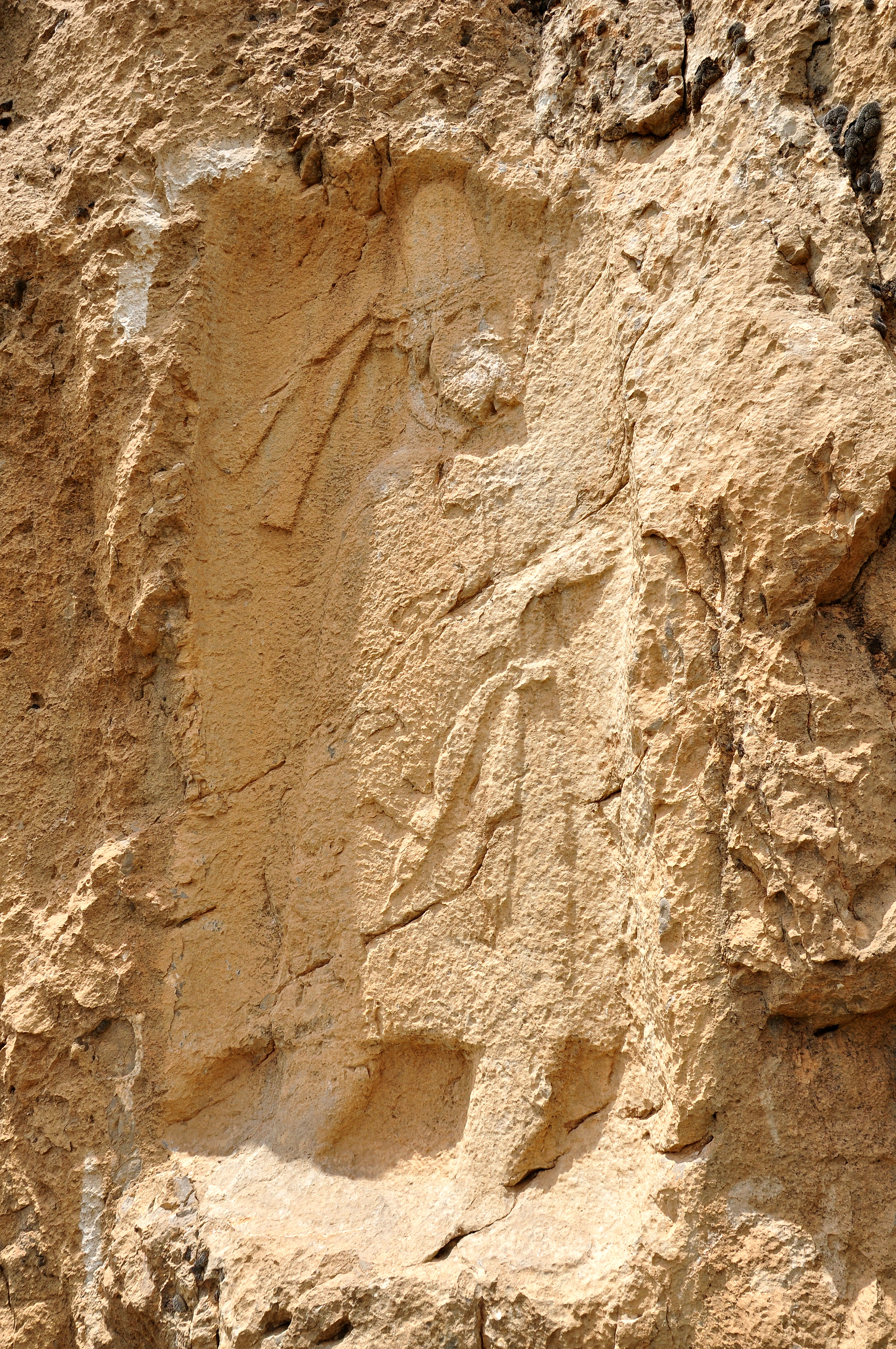
The rock-relief at Rabana-Merquly

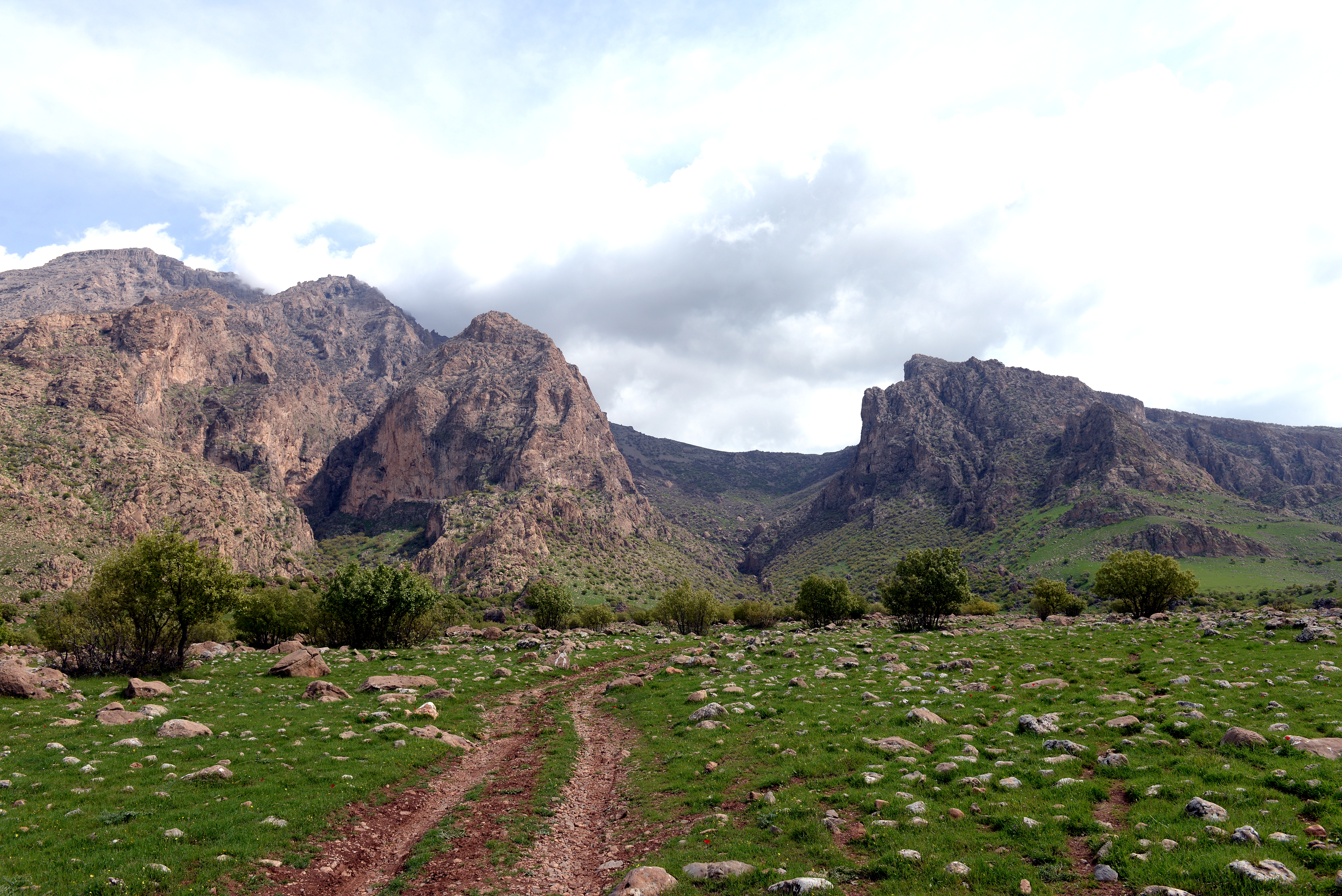
The sites of Rabana-Merquly near Qarachatan village

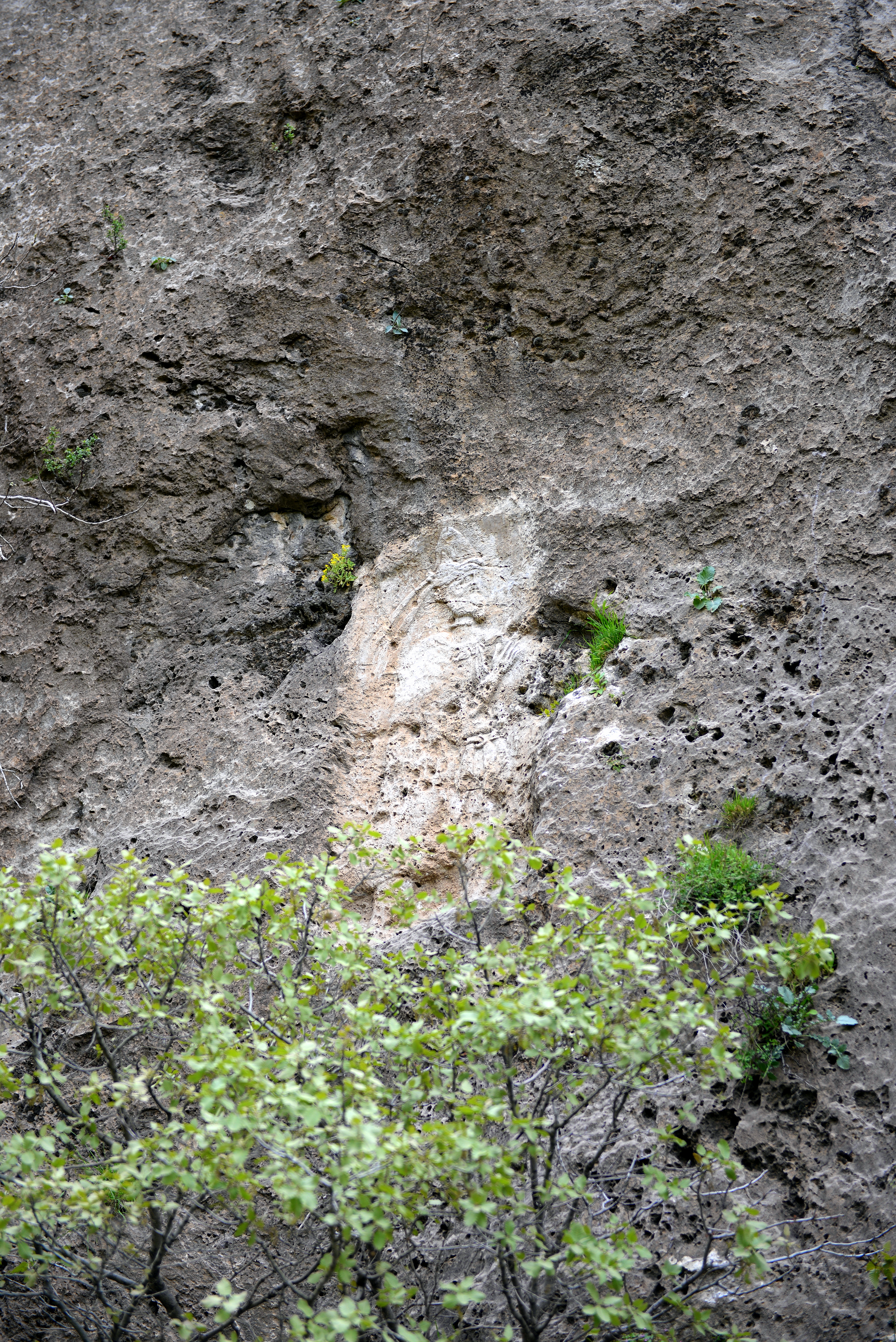
Position of the rock-relief at Rabana-Merquly

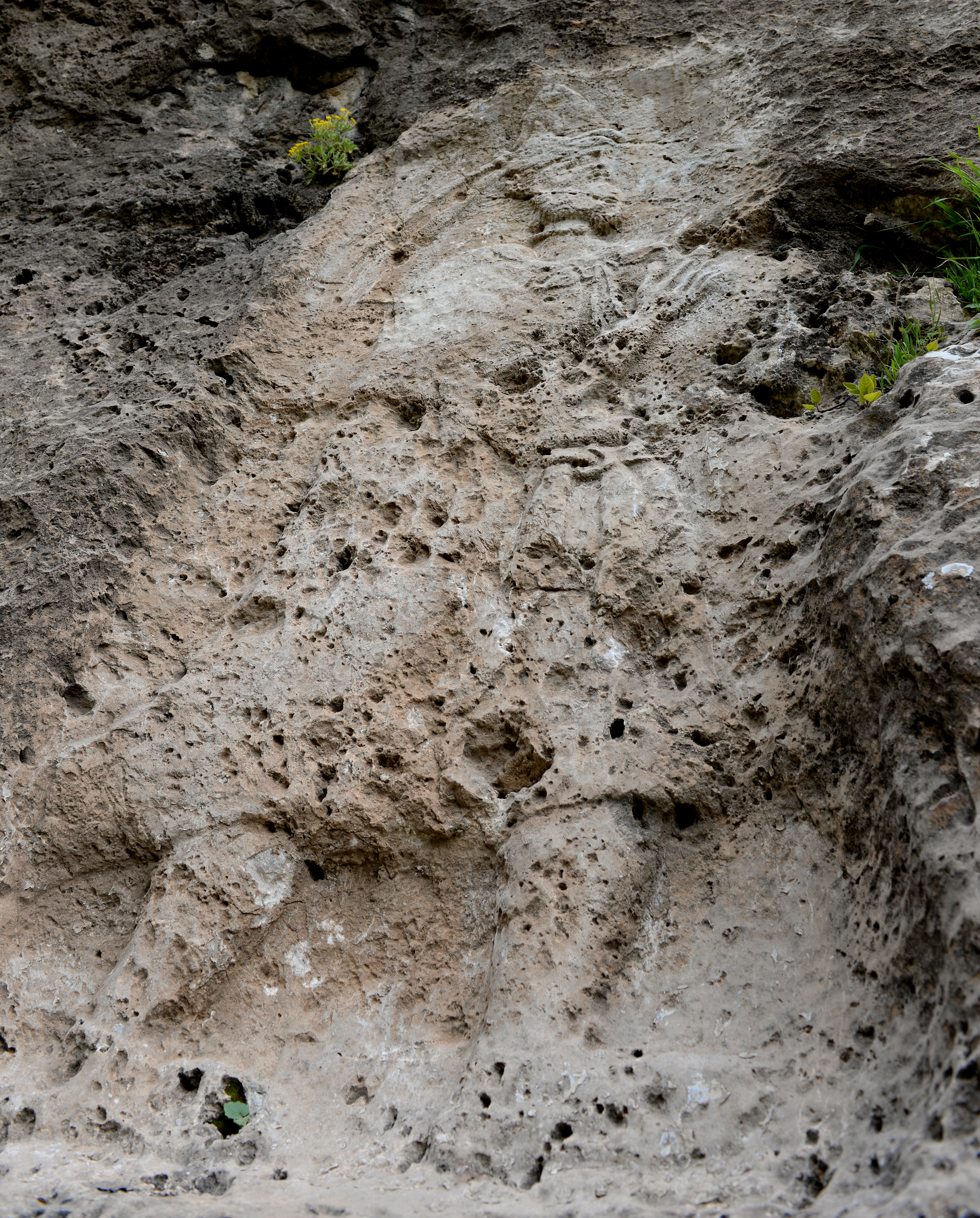
The rock-relief at Rabana-Merquly

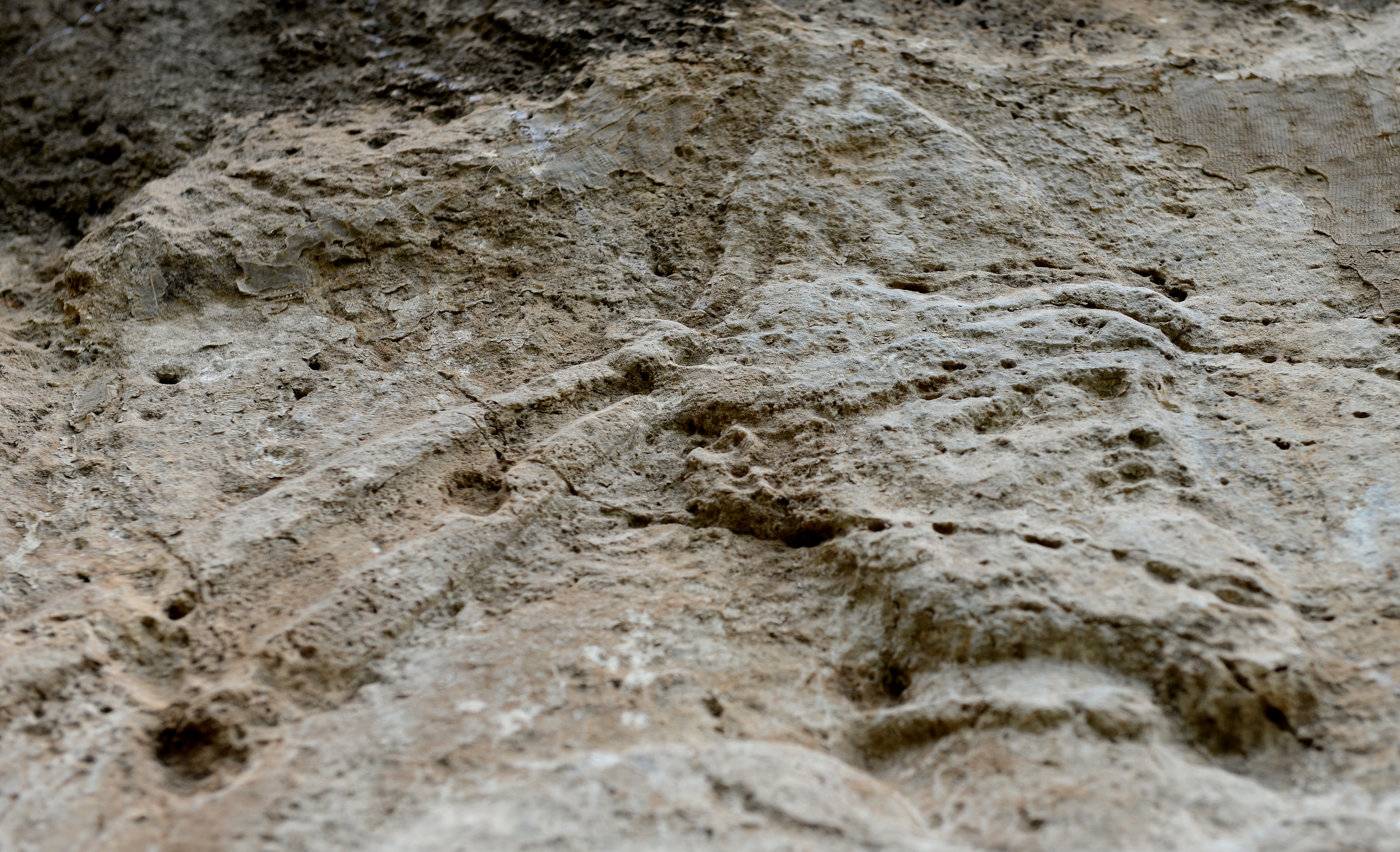
Detail of the rock-relief at Rabana-Merquly

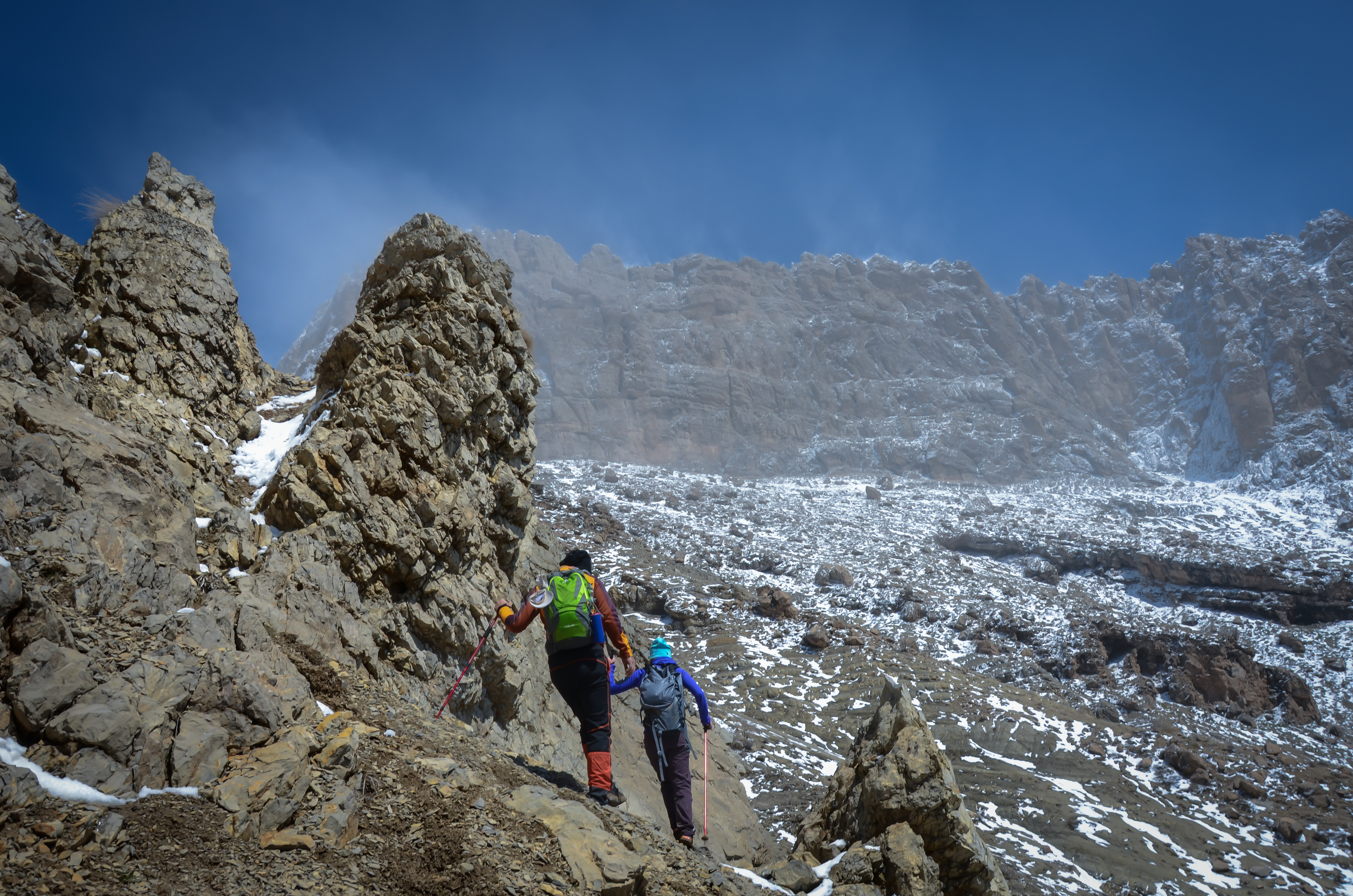
Piramagrun Mountain overlooking Qarachatan Village
