= Iddin-Sin =

Iddi[n]-Sin 𒀭𒄿𒋾𒀭𒂗𒍪
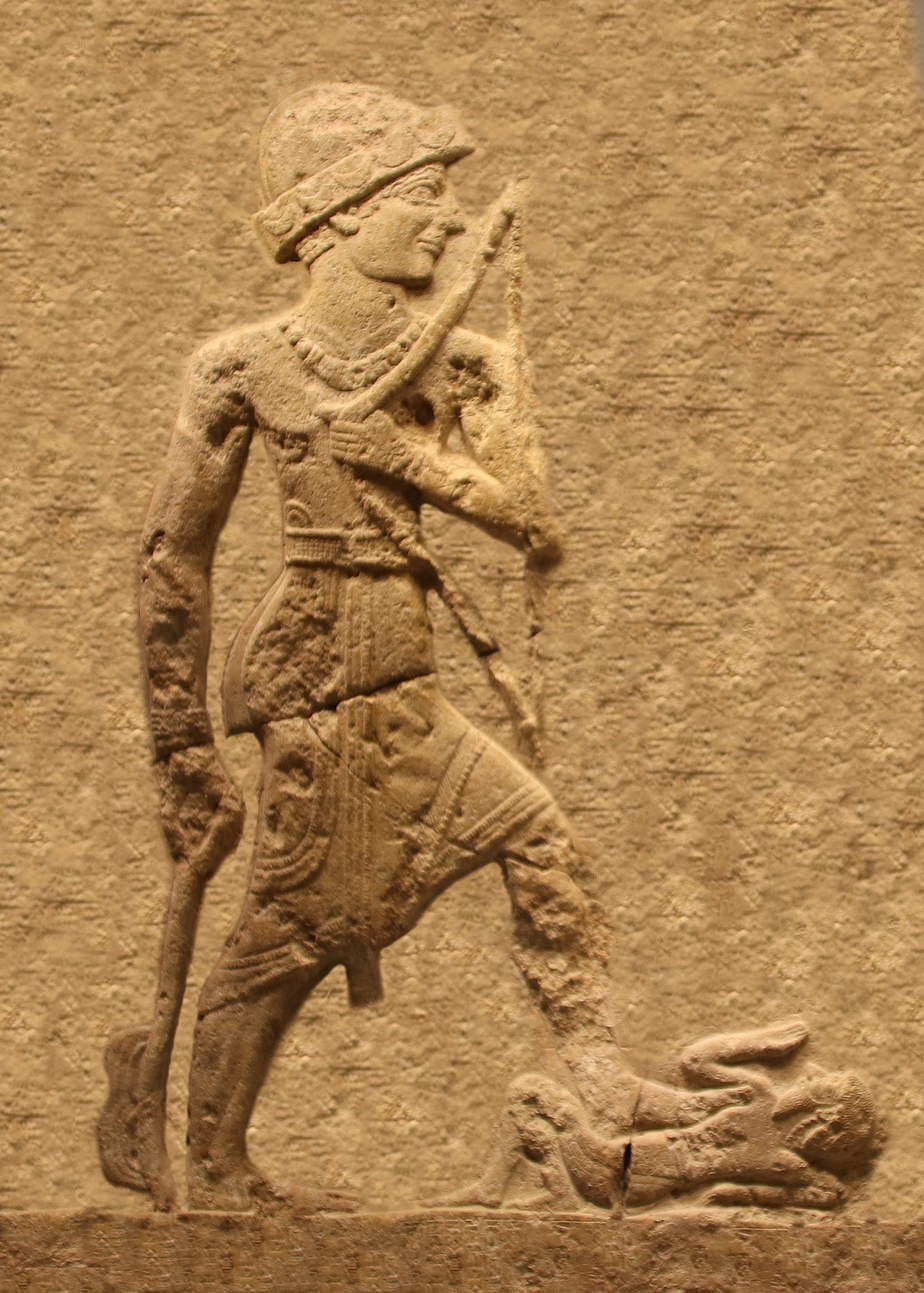
- Iddi[n]-Sin, armed with a bow and an axe, trampling a foe

King of Simurrum
- Reign: c. 1950 BC
- Issue: Zabazuna; Kubbutum

Original location of the Iddin-Sin relief, near Bitwata, modern Iraq

Iddi[n]-Sin (Akkadian: 𒀭𒄿𒋾𒀭𒂗𒍪: Iddî-Sîn; fl. c. 1950 BC) was a King (𒈗 Šàr, pronounced Shar) of the Kingdom of Simurrum. Simurrum was an important city state of the Mesopotamian area, during the period of Akkad down to Ur III. Simurrum disappears from records after the Old Babylonian period. According to an inscription (the stela from Qarachatan Village, Sulaymaniyah Governorate, Iraqi Kurdistan, now located in the Sulaymaniyah Museum), Iddi[n]-Sin seems to have been contemporary with the Lullubi king Annubanini.

Several rulers of the Simurrum Kingdom are known, such as Iddi(n)-Sin and his son Zabazuna. Various inscriptions suggest that they were contemporary with king Ishbi-Erra. In inscriptions, the name of Iddi[n]-Sin is written 𒀭𒄿𒋾𒀭𒂗𒍪, with one silent determinative (𒀭, DINGIR) before the remaining part of the name, 𒄿𒋾𒀭𒂗𒍪. 𒄿𒋾 can be read as i-ti with the geminated 't' being implied, and then in English the double 't' sound is taken more as a double 'd'. The 'n' is then added in English though not explicitly written in the Akkadian cuneiform. The second 𒀭 (DINGIR) acts as a determinative for the last part 𒂗𒍪 are the signs EN.ZU. Thus all three together form the logogram ^{D}EN.ZU, which is read as Sîn, name of the Moon God.

Four inscriptions and a relief of the Simurrum have been identified at Bitwata near Ranya in Iraqi Kurdistan, near the border with Iran, including the large relief now in the Israel Museum, and one from Sarpol-e Zahab. It is thought that the design of the relief is derived from the Victory Stele of Naram-Sin, King of Akkad, in which the king is also seen trampling enemies. It is also similar to other reliefs in the area, such as the Anubanini rock relief. The Sarpol-e Zahab relief, representing a beardless warrior with axe, trampling a foe, and inscribed with the name "Zaba(zuna), son of ...", may be the son of Iddi[n]-Sin.

Iddi-Sin is also known from a stele, which he inscribed in Akkadian, now in the Sulaymaniyah Museum, Iraq.

A seal showing Iddi[n]-Sin and his son Zabazuna (Akkadian: 𒍝𒁀𒍪𒈾: Za-ba-zu-na), is also known from the Rosen collection.

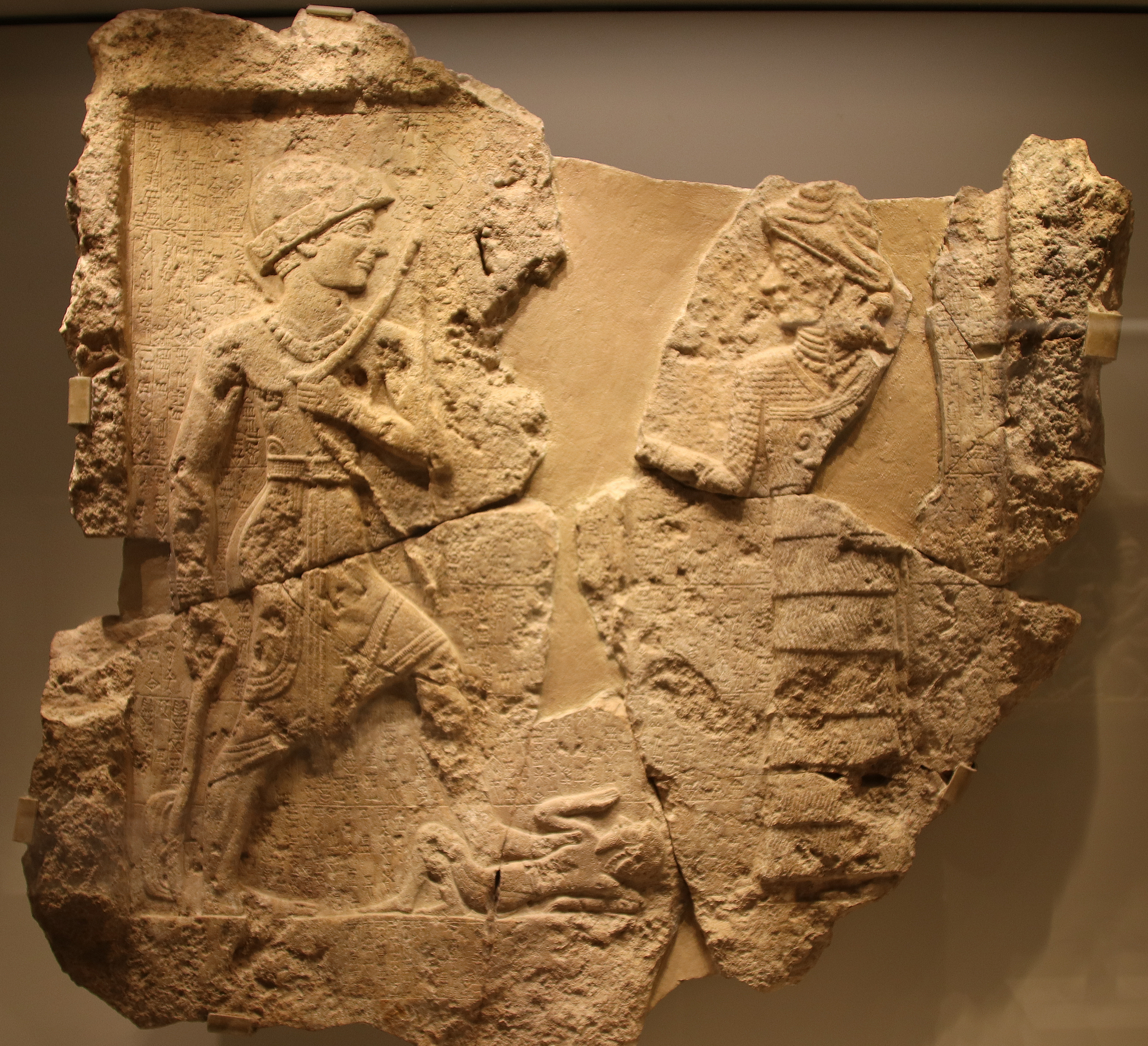
King Iddi[n]-Sin of the Kingdom of Simurrum, holding an axe and a bow, trampling a foe, facing Ishtar. c. 1950 BC. Israel Museum.

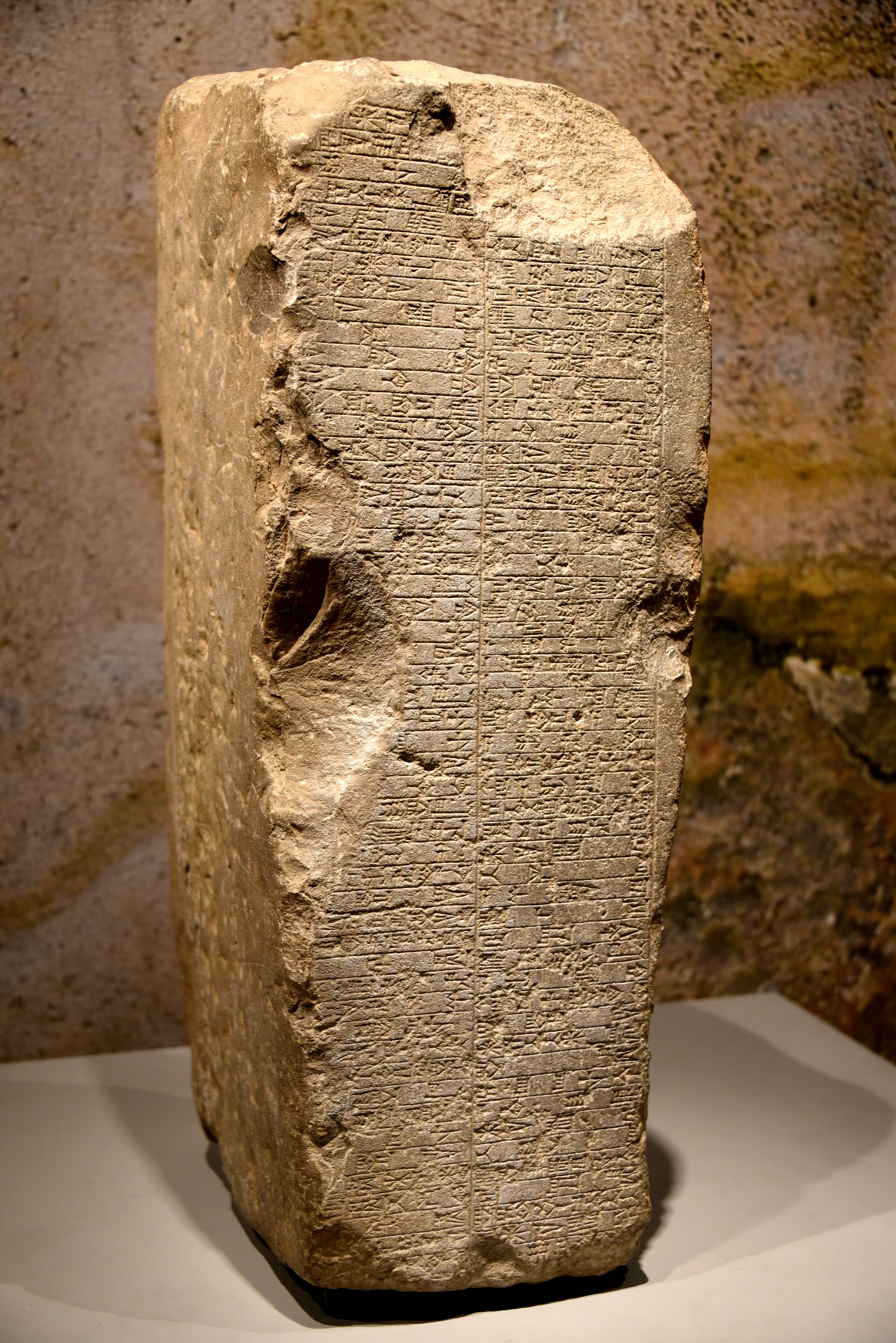
Stela of Iddi[n]-Sin, King of Simurrum. It dates back to the Old-Babylonian Period. From Qarachatan Village, Sulaymaniyah Governorate, Iraqi Kurdistan. The Sulaymaniyah Museum, Iraq.

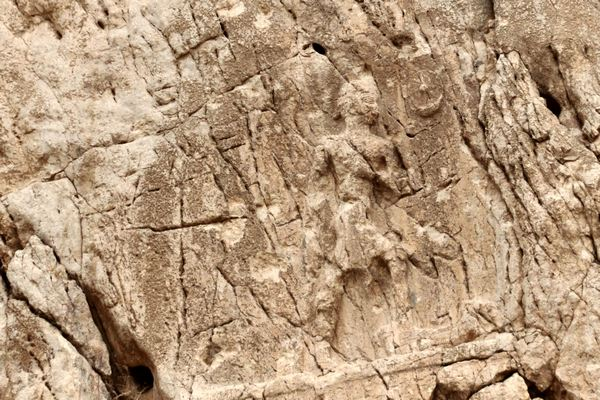
Sarpol-e Zahab, relief I. Beardless warrior with axe, trampling a foe. Sundisk above. A name "Zaba(zuna), son of ..." can be read. He is usually considered as a ruler of the Lullubi, but he could be a ruler of the Kingdom of Simurrum, son of Iddi[n]-Sin.

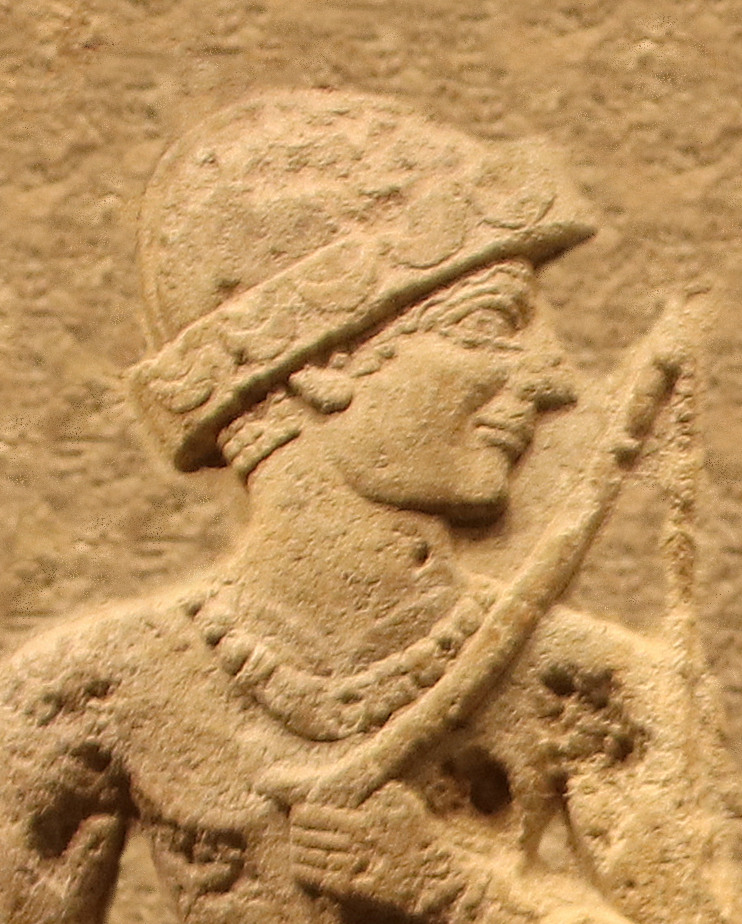
Portrait of Iddi(n)-Sin, King of Simurrum, c. 1950 BC. (detail)

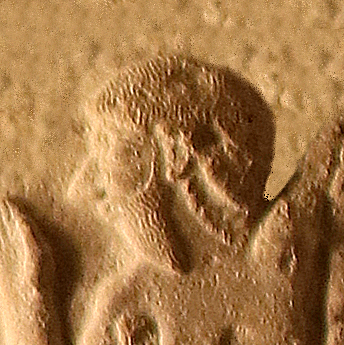
Enemy being trampled by Iddi(n)-Sin, probably a vanquished rebel called Aurnahuš in the accompanying inscription. (detail)

== See also ==
- Anobanini rock relief
