= Rabana-Merquly =

Archaeological landscape in Iraq

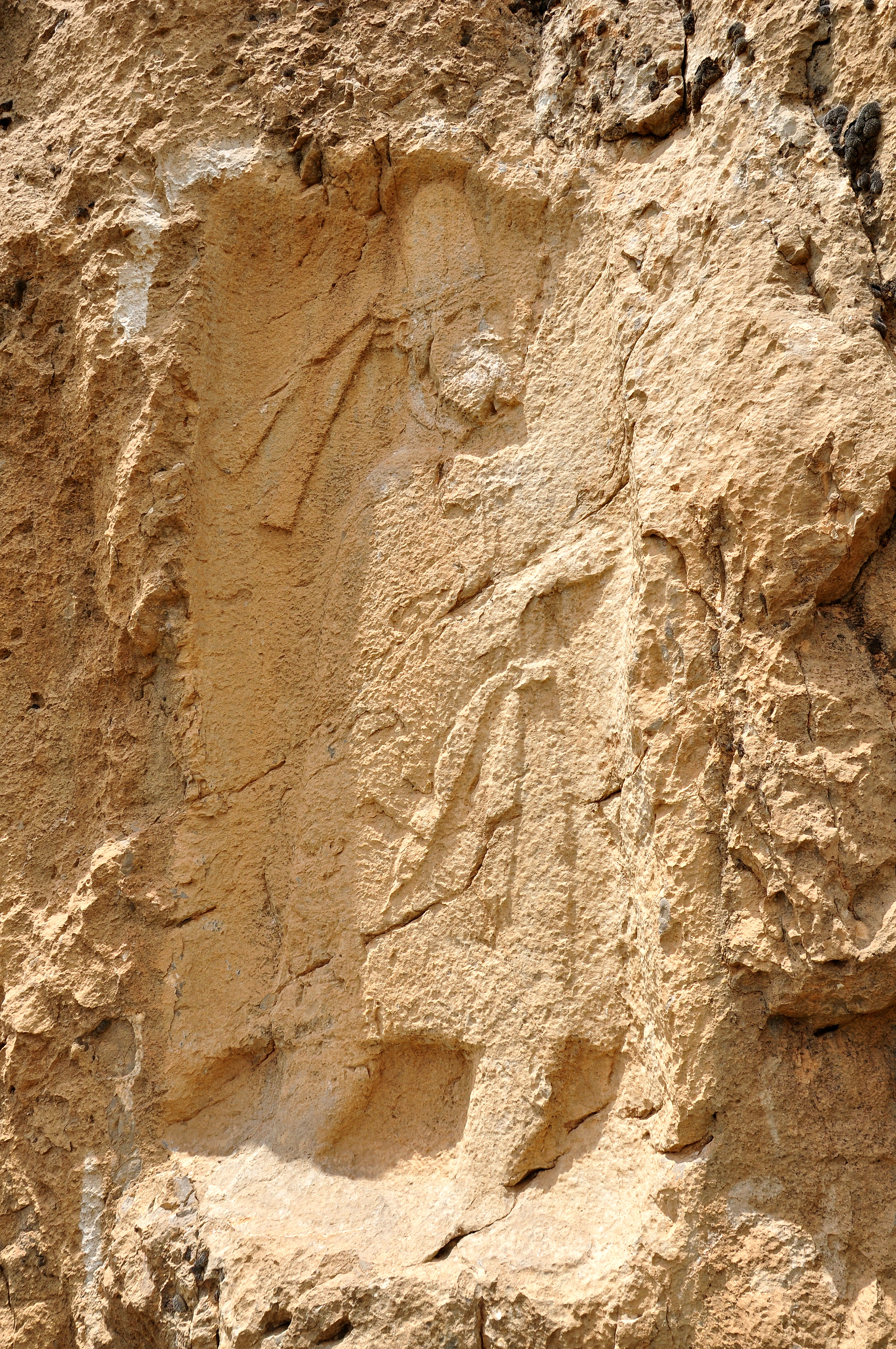
- Rock relief at Merquli depicting a standing man, possibly a king

- Location in Iraq Location in the Near East
- 35.750°N 45.229°E
- Type: Archaeological site
- Periods: Parthian Empire
- Location: Sulaymaniyah Governorate, Iraq

Site notes
- Area: 26 hectares (64 acres) (Rabana); 20 hectares (49 acres) (Merquly)
- Excavation dates: 2009; 2016; 2017

Rabana-Merquly is a cluster of archaeological sites in Qarachatan, Sulaymaniyah Governorate, Kurdistan Region, Iraq. It consists of at least two separate fortified settlements, Rabana and Merquly, and at least two rock reliefs, probably all dating to the Middle Parthian period (c. 50-150 CE). It has been suggested that Rabana-Merquly was the site of ancient Natounia or Natounissarokerta, a city that is otherwise only known from coins.

== History of research ==
Excavations by the Sulaimaniyah Directorate of Antiquities took place at Merquly in 2009. Rabana was studied in 2016-2017 by a team from Heidelberg University and the Iraqi-Kurdistan Directorate of Antiquities.

In June 2022, it was announced that researchers believe a rock relief was a king of Adiabene meaning a nearby fortress is the lost city of Natounia in the Kurdish region of Iraq.

According to Arab News, "researchers from the Directorate of Antiquities in Sulaymaniyah in Iraqi Kurdistan, together with Dr. Michael Brown of Germany’s Heidelberg University, say that the established fortification site of Rabana-Merquly could house the ruins of Natounia."

== See also ==
- Cities of the ancient Near East
- Qarachatan
