= Sulaymaniyah Museum =

Coordinates: 35°33′27.25″N 45°25′32.95″E

The Slemani Museum

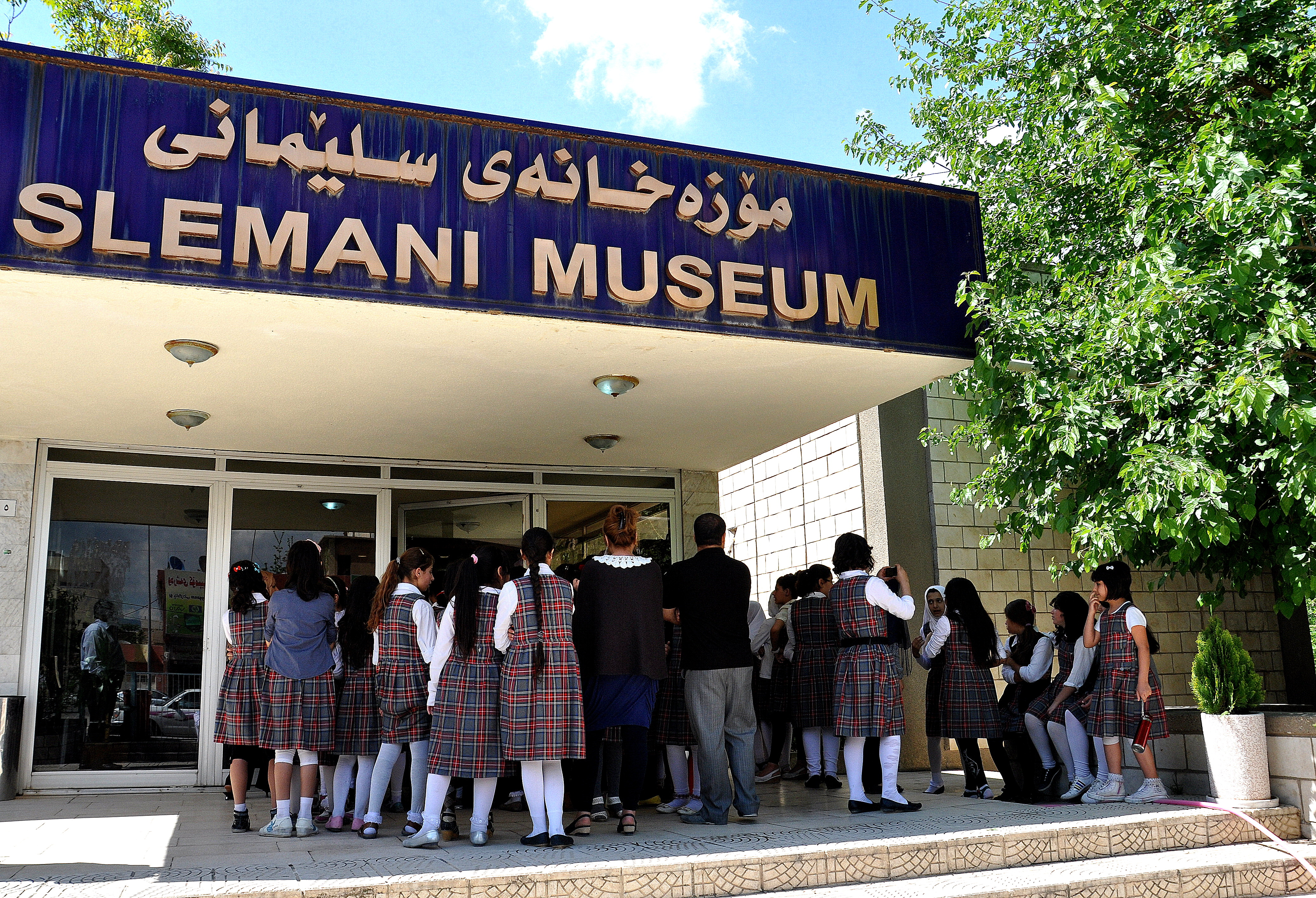
- School children visiting the Sulaymaniyah Museum
- Established: July 14, 1961
- Location: Sulaymaniyah, Sulaymaniyah Governorate, Kurdistan Region, Iraq
- Type: Archaeological museum
- Director: Hashim Hama Abdullah
- Website: slemanimuseum.org

The Sulaymaniyah Museum (Kurdish: مۆزه‌خانه‌ی سلێمانی; Arabic: متحف السليمانية), or Slemani Museum, is an archeological museum located in Sulaymaniyah in the Kurdistan Region of Iraq. It is the second largest museum in Iraq, after the National Museum of Iraq in Baghdad. It houses artifacts dating from the prehistoric period to the late Islamic and Ottoman periods. Several halls of the museum have undergone renovation work and the museum was closed to the public for refurbishment from October 1, 2018, to October 2019.

== History ==
=== Opening ===
The museum was opened officially on July 14, 1961. Initially, it was composed of a small building in the Shorsh District. After several years, the museum acquired a new and large building in the heart of Salim Street in the year 1980. The current building has an area of 6000 square meters and is a one-story building. The artifacts are displayed in one small hall (which was renovated by the UNESCO in 2023) and two large and long halls which are connected by a square-shaped and open lecture hall. During the Iraq-Iran war (1980–1988), the museum was closed entirely to the public. It was reopened for a very short period in 1990. After the Iraqi invasion of Kuwait in August 1990, the museum was closed once again. It was re-opened officially by Jalal Talabani on August 20, 2000; Talabani was the secretary general of the Patriotic Union of Kurdistan at that time.

=== Post-2003 ===
After the US-led invasion of Iraq and subsequent looting of the National Museum in Baghdad, the Sulaymaniyah Museum helped to recover and return stolen artifacts through the controversial practice of buying looted artifacts.

=== UNESCO ===
Since 2011, the museum has been collaborating with the UNESCO to develop and renovate the museum and expand its building.

=== Tablets in 3D ===
A small selection of tablets were acquired with a high-resolution 3D-scanner following the example of the Frau Professor Hilprecht Collection of Babylonian Antiquities. High contrast renderings were created with the GigaMesh Software Framework. The images and 3D-models are freely available within the Dataverse of the Heidelberg University.

=== Paikuli Gallery ===
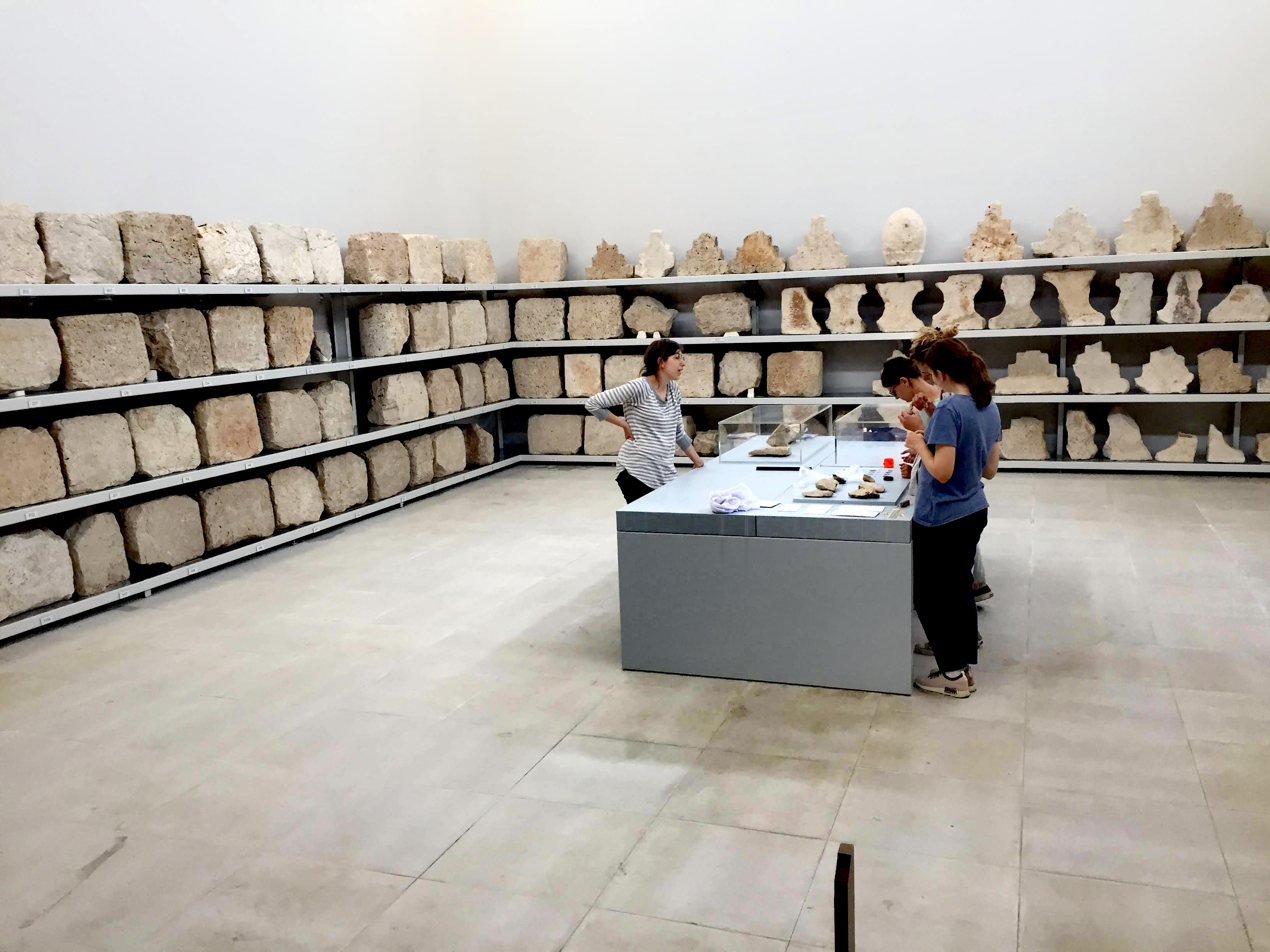
The Paikuli Gallery at the Sulaymaniyah Museum, final preparations before official opening

The Sulaymaniyah Museum in collaboration with the Sapienza University of Rome opened a new gallery on June 10, 2019. The gallery was sponsored by the Italian Ministry of Foreign Affairs (MAECI) and the Ministry of Cultural Heritage (MiBAC). All of the inscribed stone blocks (including many newly discovered ones after 2006) of the commemorative monument of the Sassanian king Narseh (c. 293 CE) were displayed for the very first time to the public. In addition, many building stone blocks and some Sassanian coins and bullae were also included in this permanent exhibition.

=== Slemani Museum Kids ===
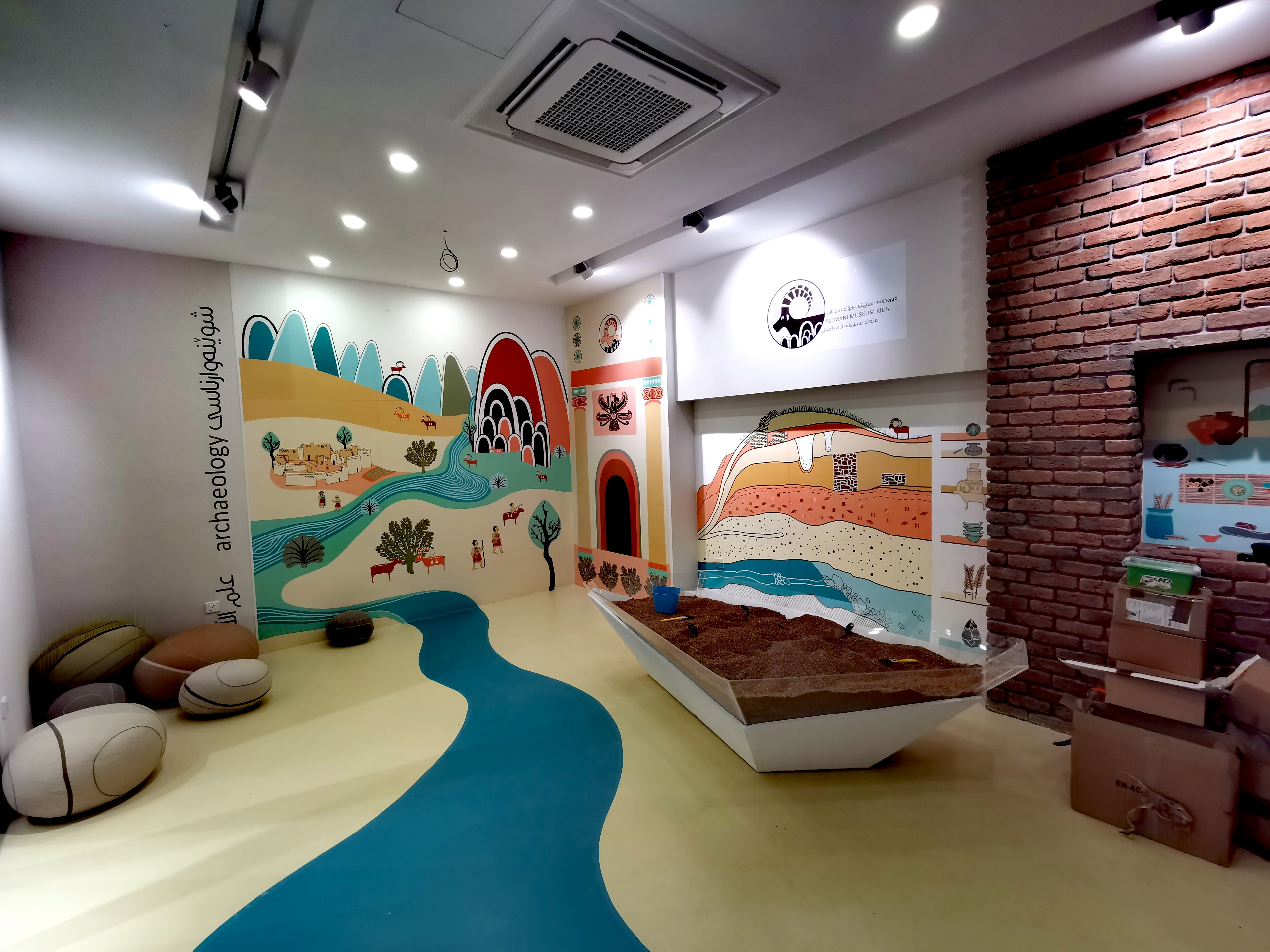
Slemani Museum Kids

On September 5, 2019, the Sulaymaniyah Museum inaugurated a hall dedicated to children and called it "Slemani Museum Kids." The hall has many teaching and demonstrative tools for children. This small museum is the first bespoke museum space for children in Iraq. The Consul General of the UK in Kurdistan, Slemani governor, and Director-General of the Directorate of Archaeology and Antiquities in Kurdistan have attended the event, as well as many other high-ranking officials in Kurdistan Region in addition to the public. Slemani Museum Kids was a co-creation of the project Archaeological Practice and Heritage Protection in the Kurdistan Region of Iraq. The project is led by the University of Glasgow (UK) in collaboration with the Slemani Directorate of Antiquities and Inherit (UK) and is funded by the British Council's Cultural Protection Fund, in partnership with the Department for Digital, Culture, Media, and Sport.

=== Narseh Gallery ===
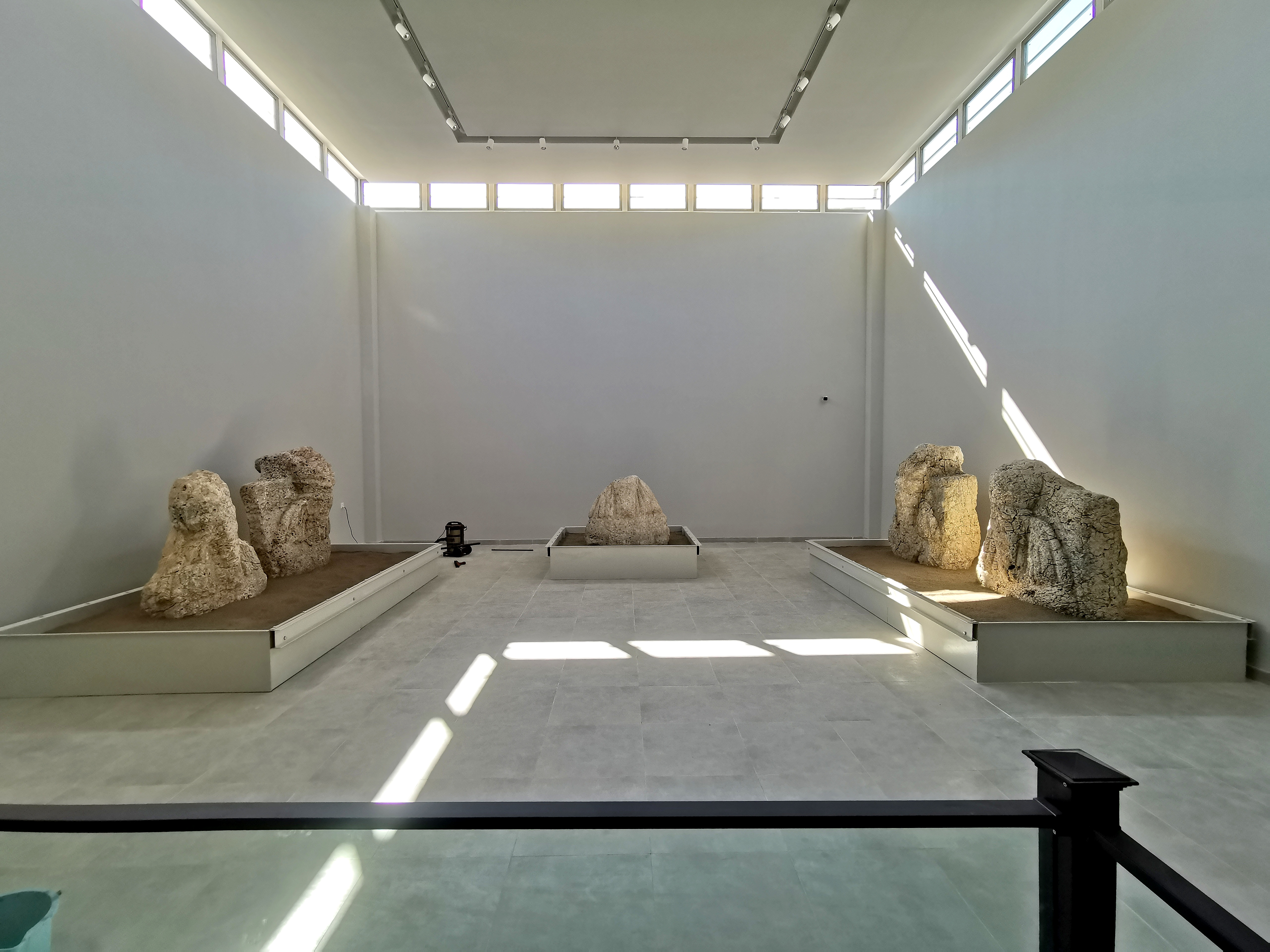
Three days before the official inauguration of Narseh Gallery at Sulaymaniyah Museum, Iraqi Kurdistan

The Sulaymaniyah Museum and Directorate of Antiquities in collaboration with the Italian Archaeological Mission in Iraqi Kurdistan (MAIKI) created a new permanent gallery displaying for the very first time four large busts of the Sassanian king Narseh (in high reliefs) and one large bust carved in the round. These once decorated the Paikuli Tower, Southern West Sulaymaniyah, Iraqi Kurdistan, and date back to c. 293 CE. The gallery was officially inaugurated on October 24, 2021.

=== Prehistory Gallery ===
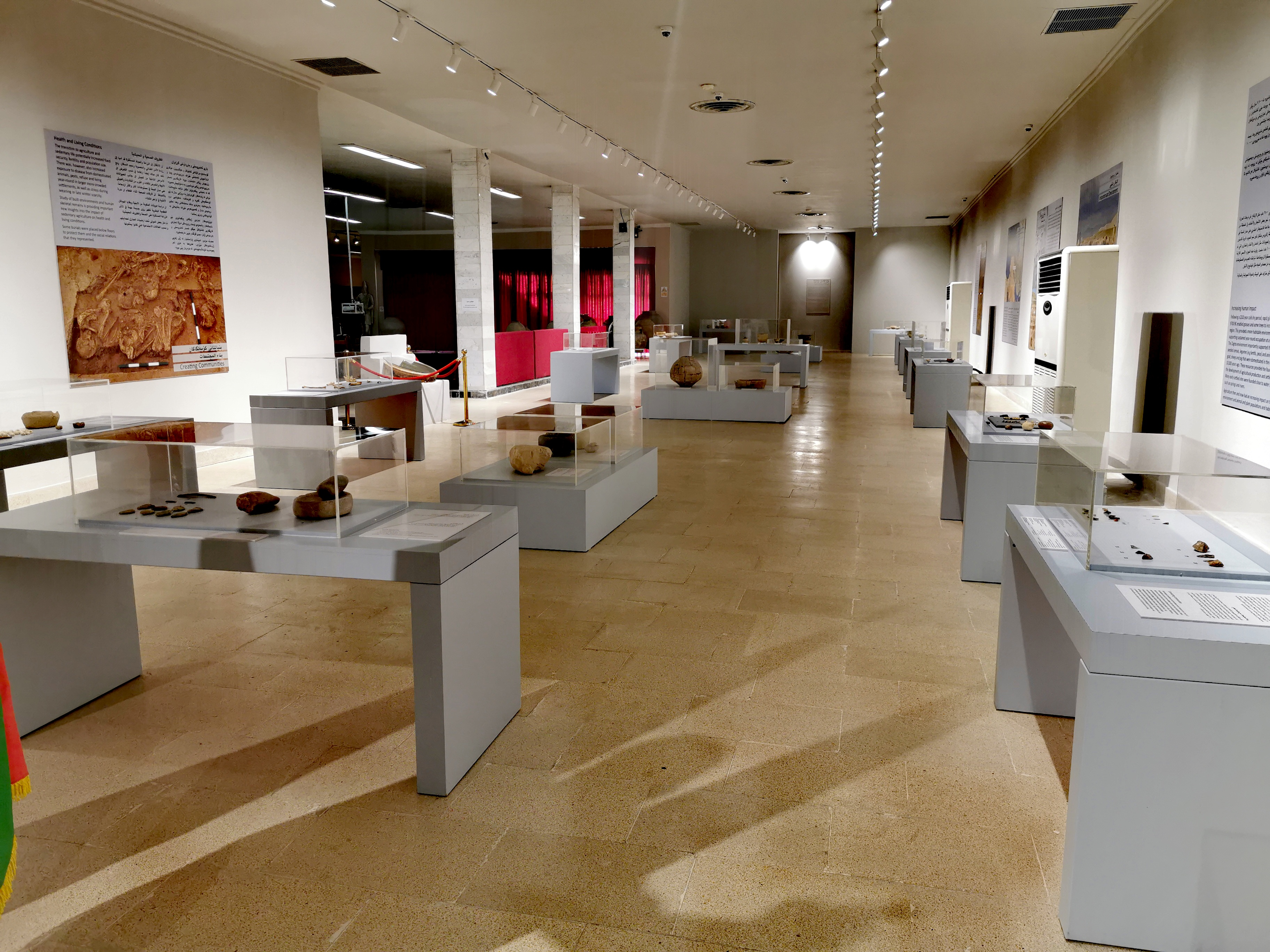
The day of the official inauguration of the Prehistory Gallery at the Sulaymaniyah Museum, Iraqi Kurdistan

The Sulaymaniyah Museum renovated two large halls in order to open a new permanent exhibition displaying hundreds of artifacts dating back to the prehistoric period. The artifacts mainly came from Iraqi Kurdistan and its Paleolithic caves, in addition to several recently excavated ancient sites and mounds. The project was sponsored by the Embassy of the United States of America. The exhibition was supposed to be opened in early March 2020, but because of the coronavirus pandemic, the inauguration date was deferred. It was officially inaugurated on February 2, 2021.

=== Tablet V of the Epic of Gligamesh ===
The newly discovered tablet V of the Epic of Gilgamesh, which dates back to the old Babylonian period, 2003–1595 BC is currently housed in the Museum. In 2023, a new Kurdish translation was made by the Sulaymaniyah Museum for the film Where is Gilgamesh? (Karzan Kardozi, 2024) a Kurdish feature film based on the Epic of Gilgamesh.

=== Gallery ===
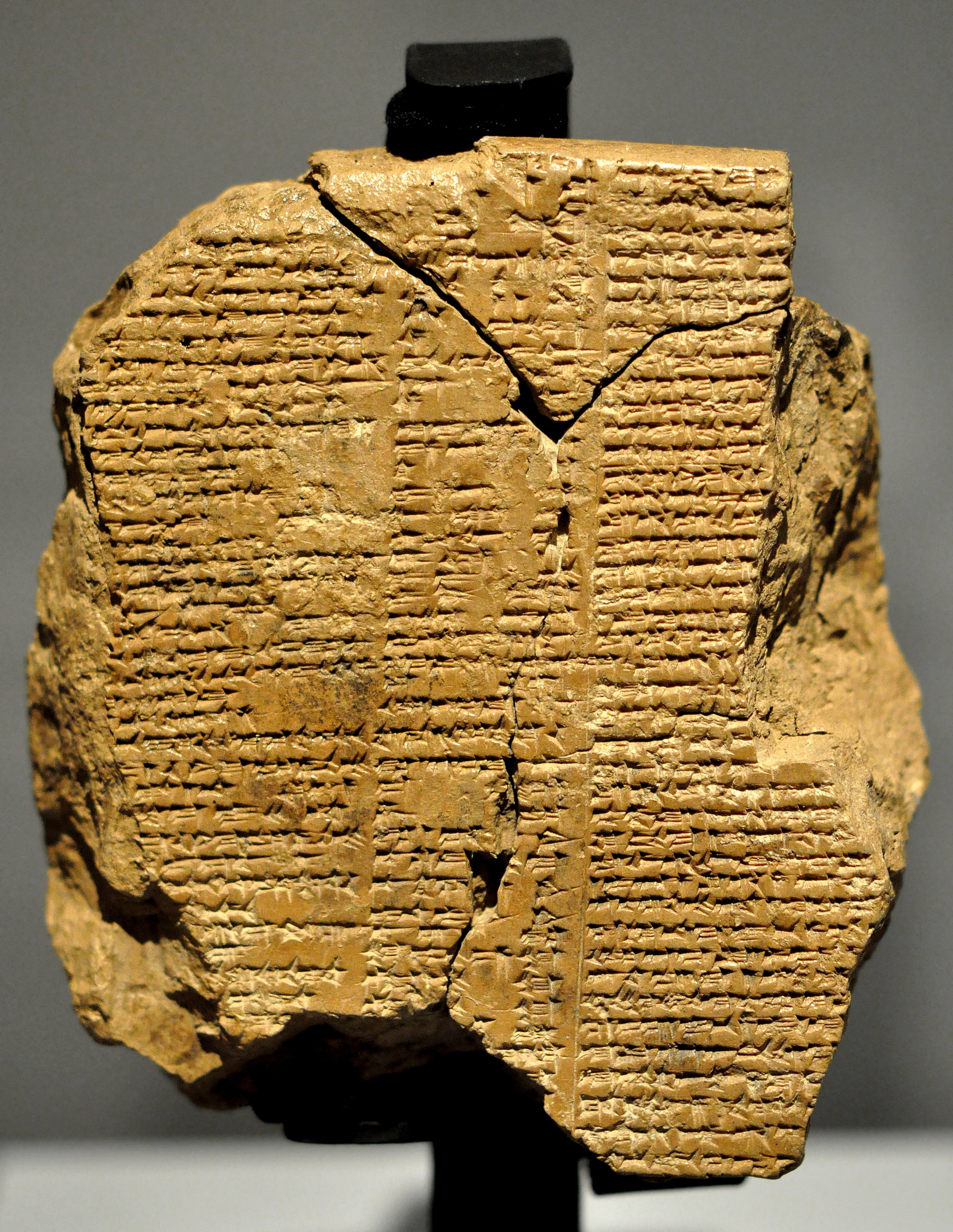
Tablet V of the Epic of Gilgamesh

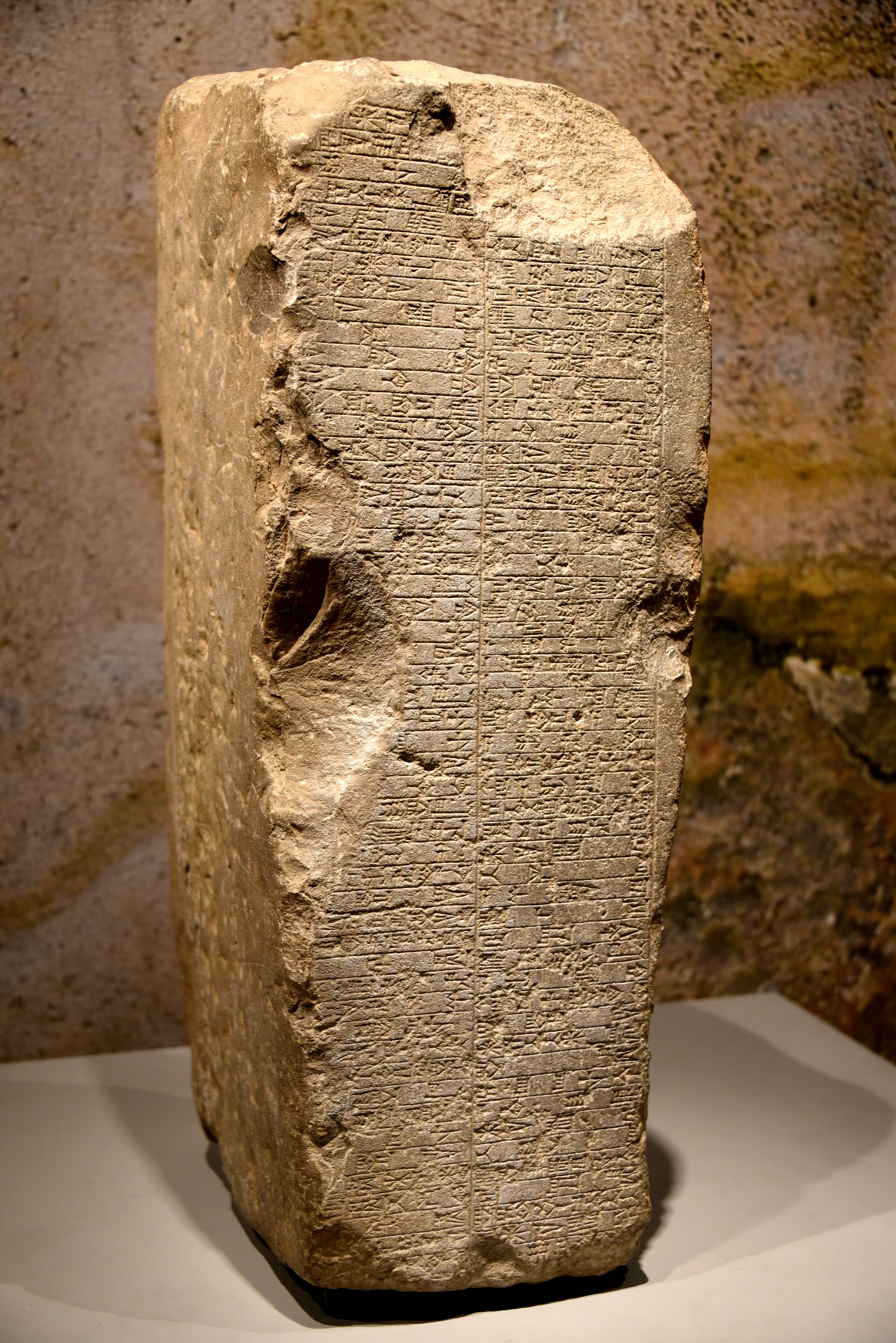
Stela of Iddi-Sin, King of Simurrum, Old-Babylonian Period

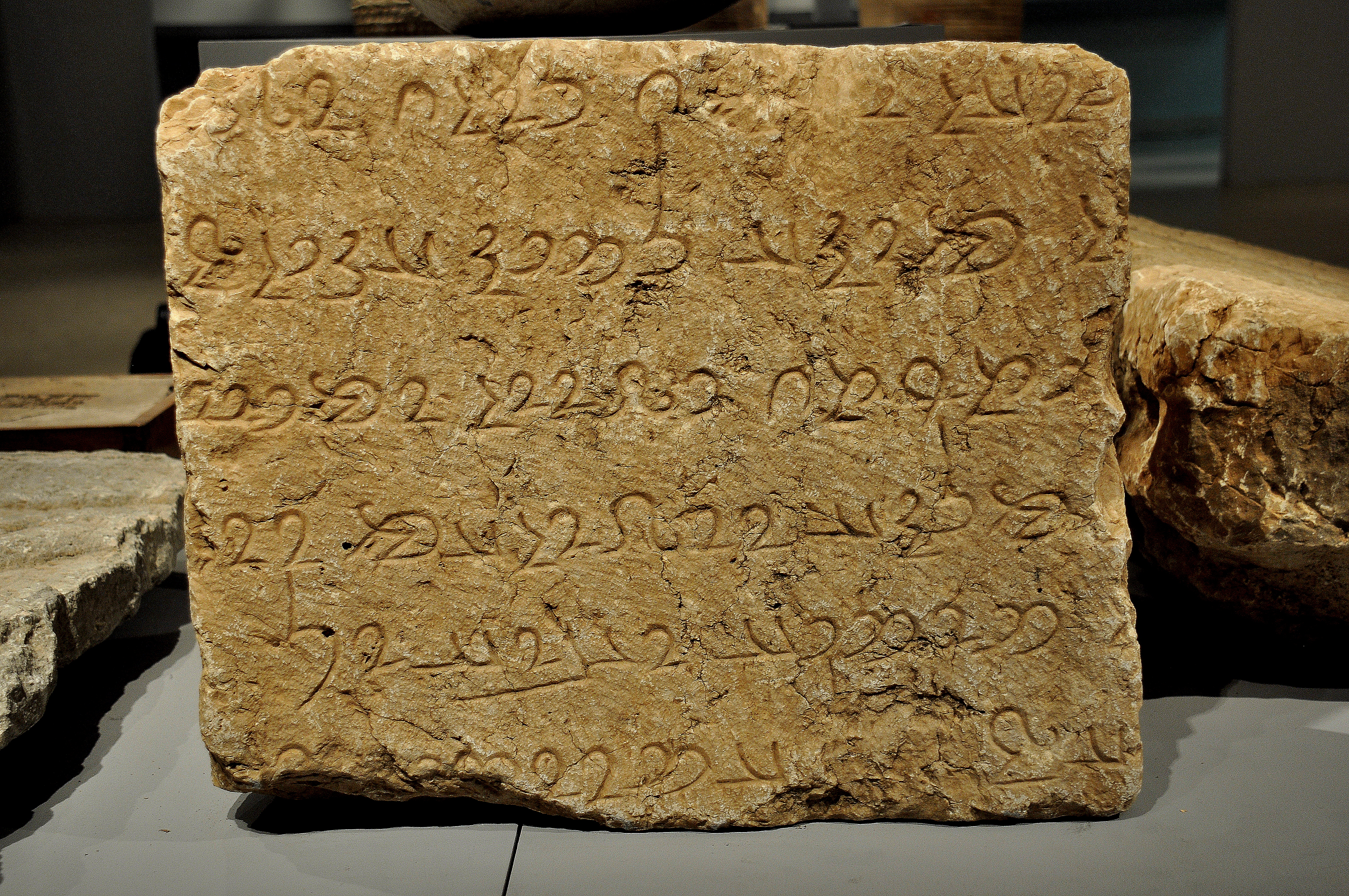
Stone block with Paikuli inscription in Middle Persian

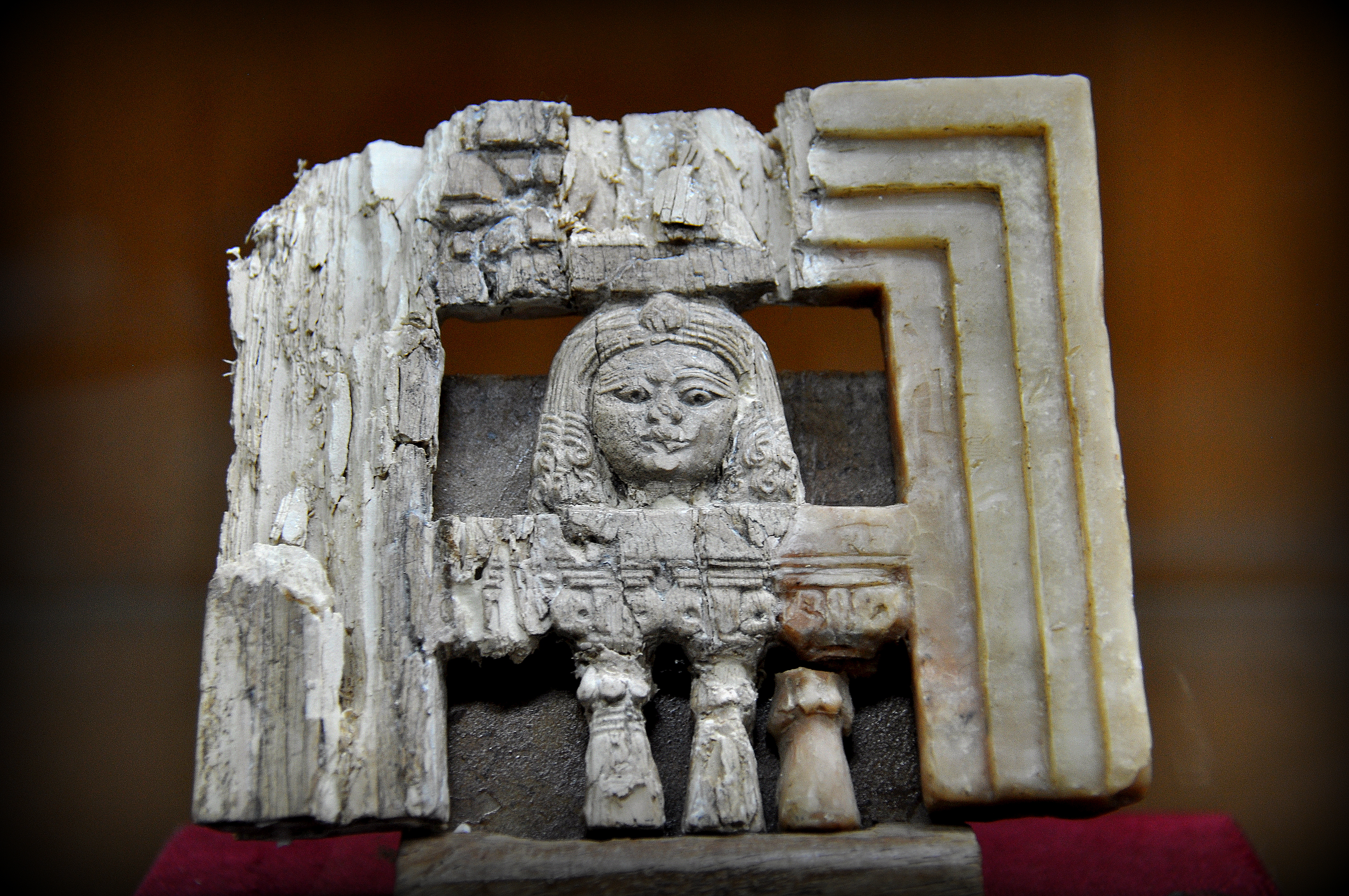
"The lady at the window," one of the famous Nimrud ivories' plaques

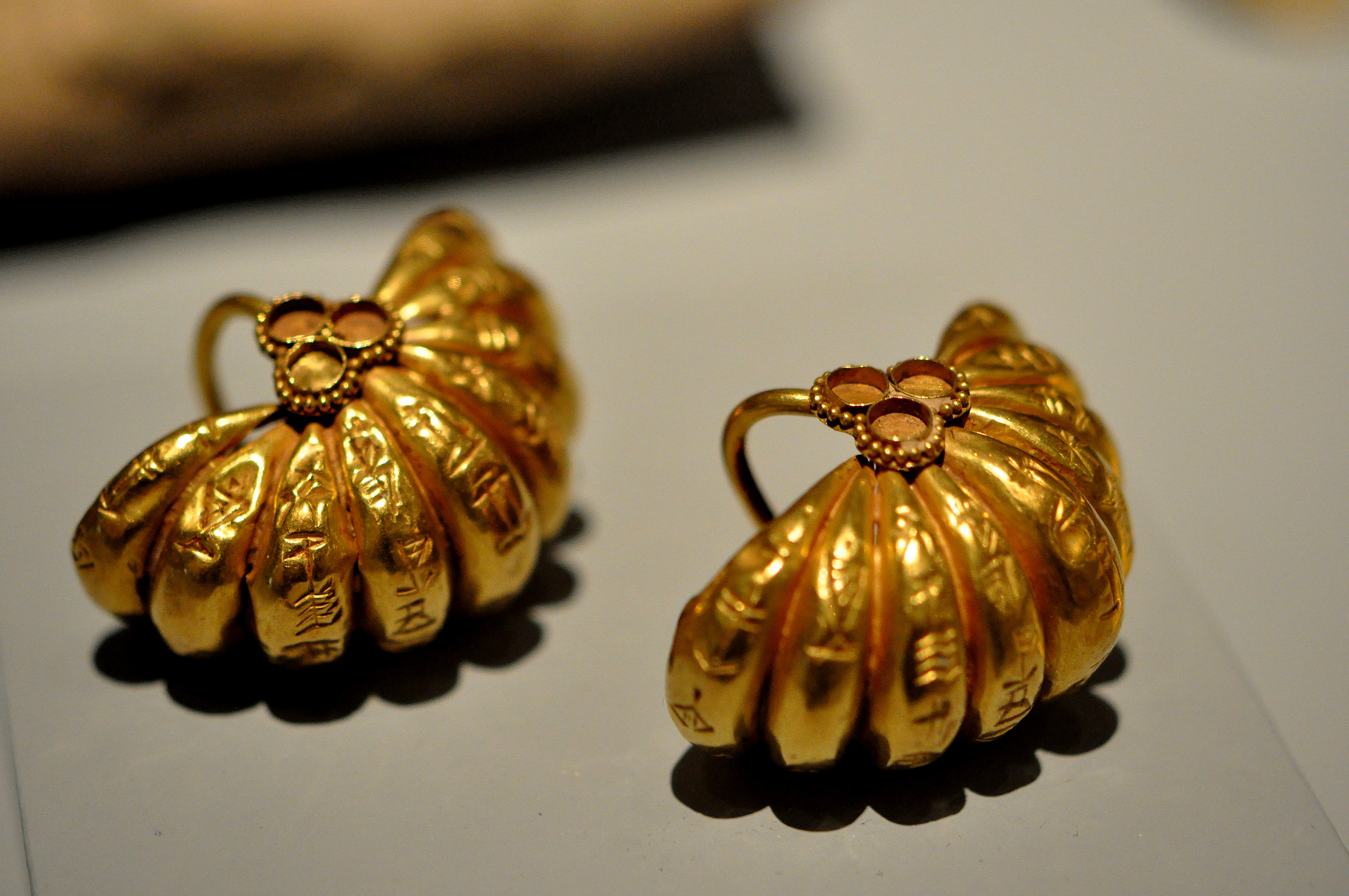
Gold earrings, the name of king Shulgi of Ur is inscribed

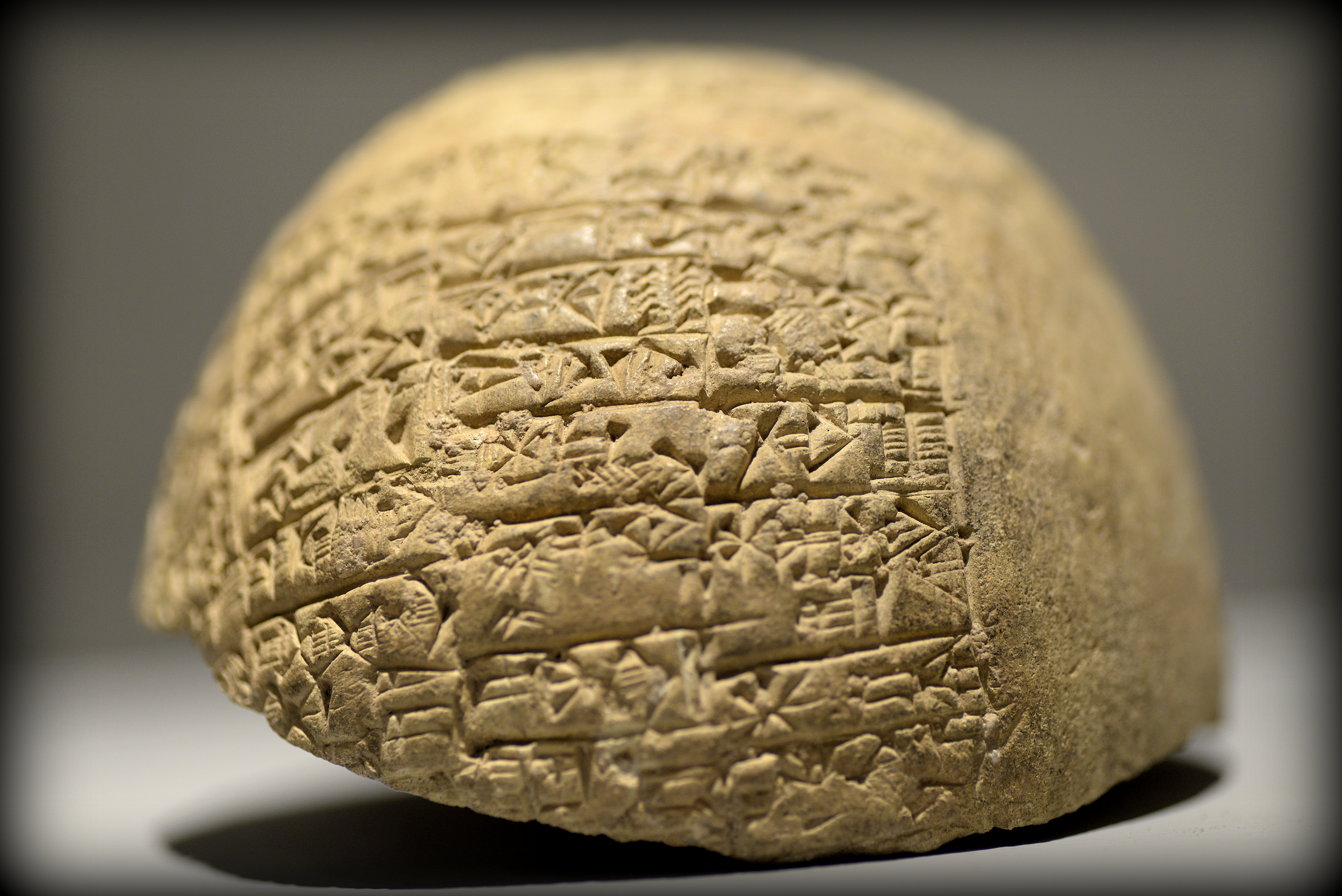
An Inscribed stand's head, mentioning the name of Entemena, c. 2400 BCE

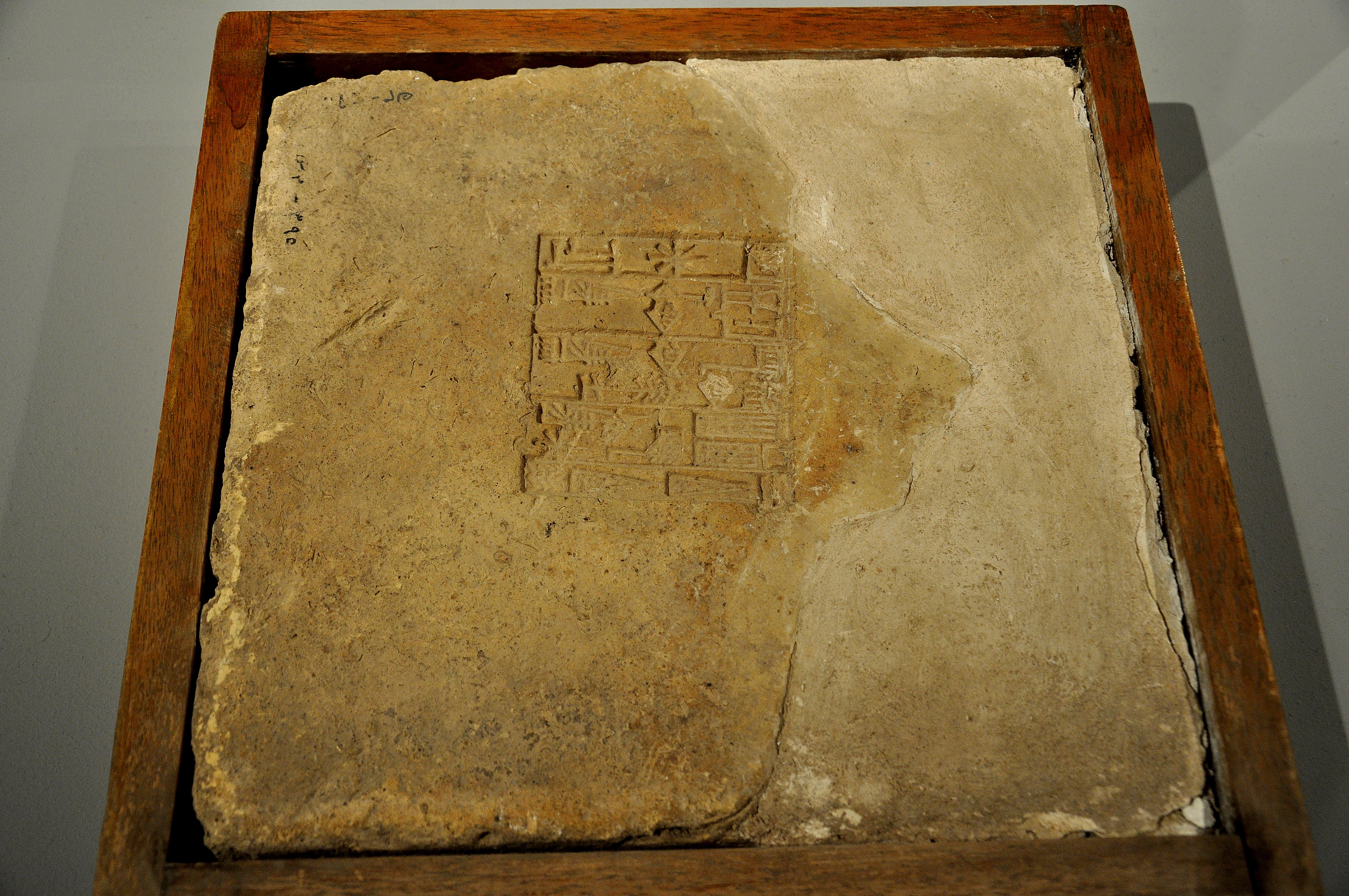
A brick stamped with the name of Ur-Nammu of Ur, 2112-2094 BCE

== See also ==
- List of museums in Iraq
