= Simurrum =

Unlocated ancient kingdom in Mesopotamia

Kingdom of Simurrum 𒋛𒈬𒌨𒊑𒅎
- 3rd millennium BCE–2nd millennium BCE
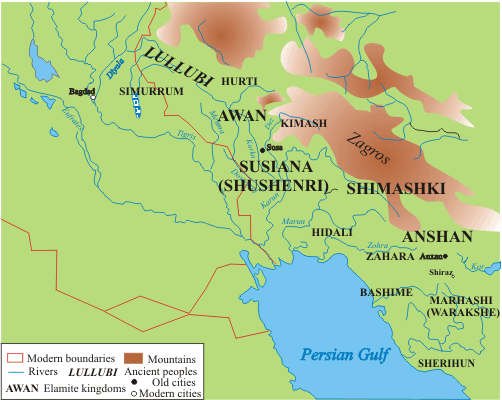
- Territory of Simurrum in the Mesopotamia area
- Common languages: Akkadian
- Government: Monarchy
- Historical era: Early Bronze
  - Established: 3rd millennium BCE
  - Disestablished: 2nd millennium BCE
- Today part of: Iraq

Simurrum (Akkadian: 𒋛𒈬𒌨𒊑𒅎: Si-mu-ur-ri-im) was an important city state of the Mesopotamian area from around 2000 BC to 1500 BC, during the period of the Akkadian Empire down to Ur III. The Simurrum Kingdom disappears from records after the Old Babylonian period. It has been proposed that in Old Babylonian times its name was Zabban, a notable cult center of Adad though this name is mostly known from much later texts. Zabban is noted as a cult center of Adad into the Neo-Babylonian period. There were actually two towns named Zabban. One has a proposed location of Sulaima¢n Beg (44°40'52" E,Long 34°47'19" NLat). Simurrum was a neighbor and sometimes ally with the Lullubi kingdom.

== History ==
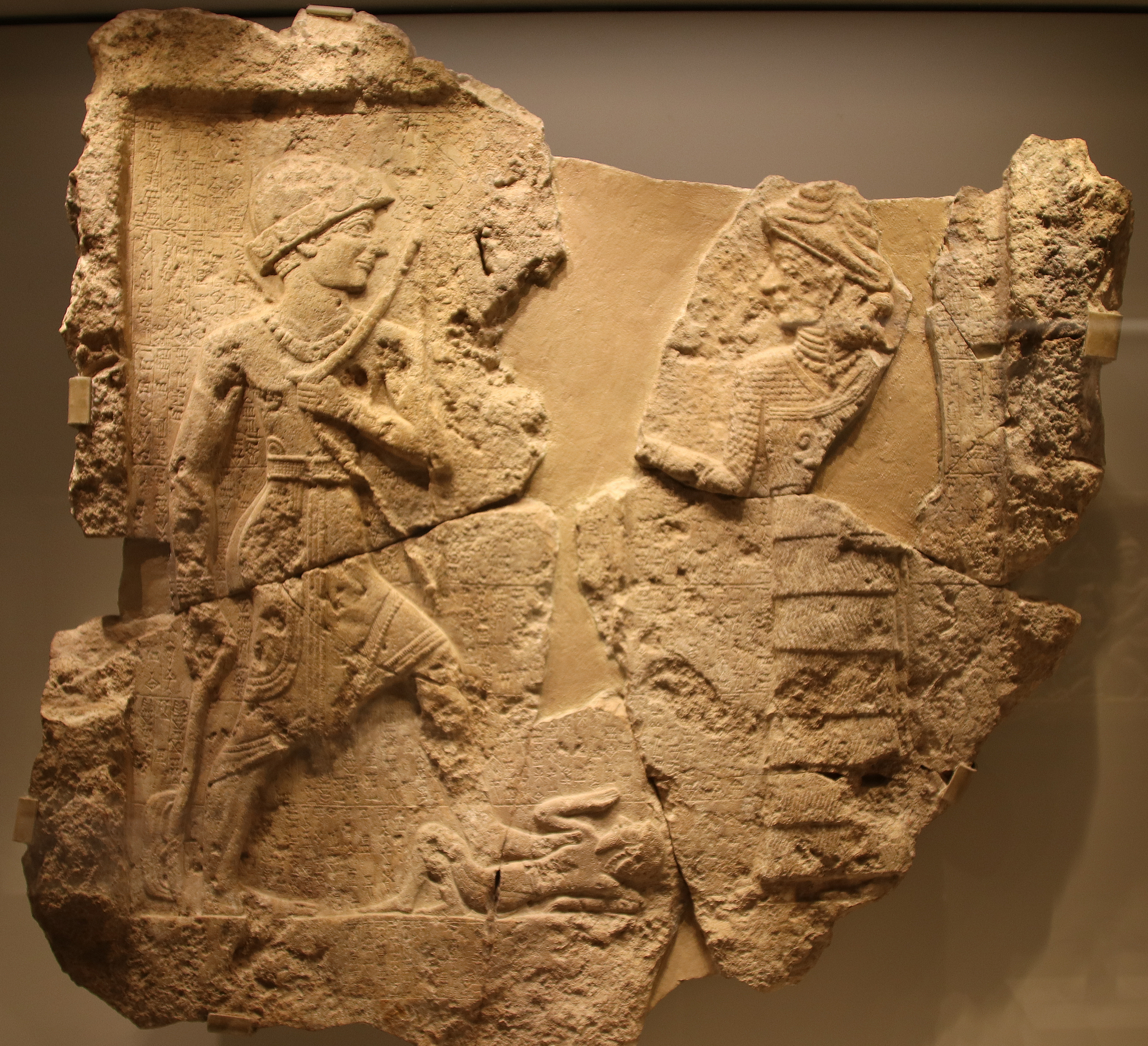
Rock Relief of Iddin-Sin, King of Simurrum, c. 2000 BC

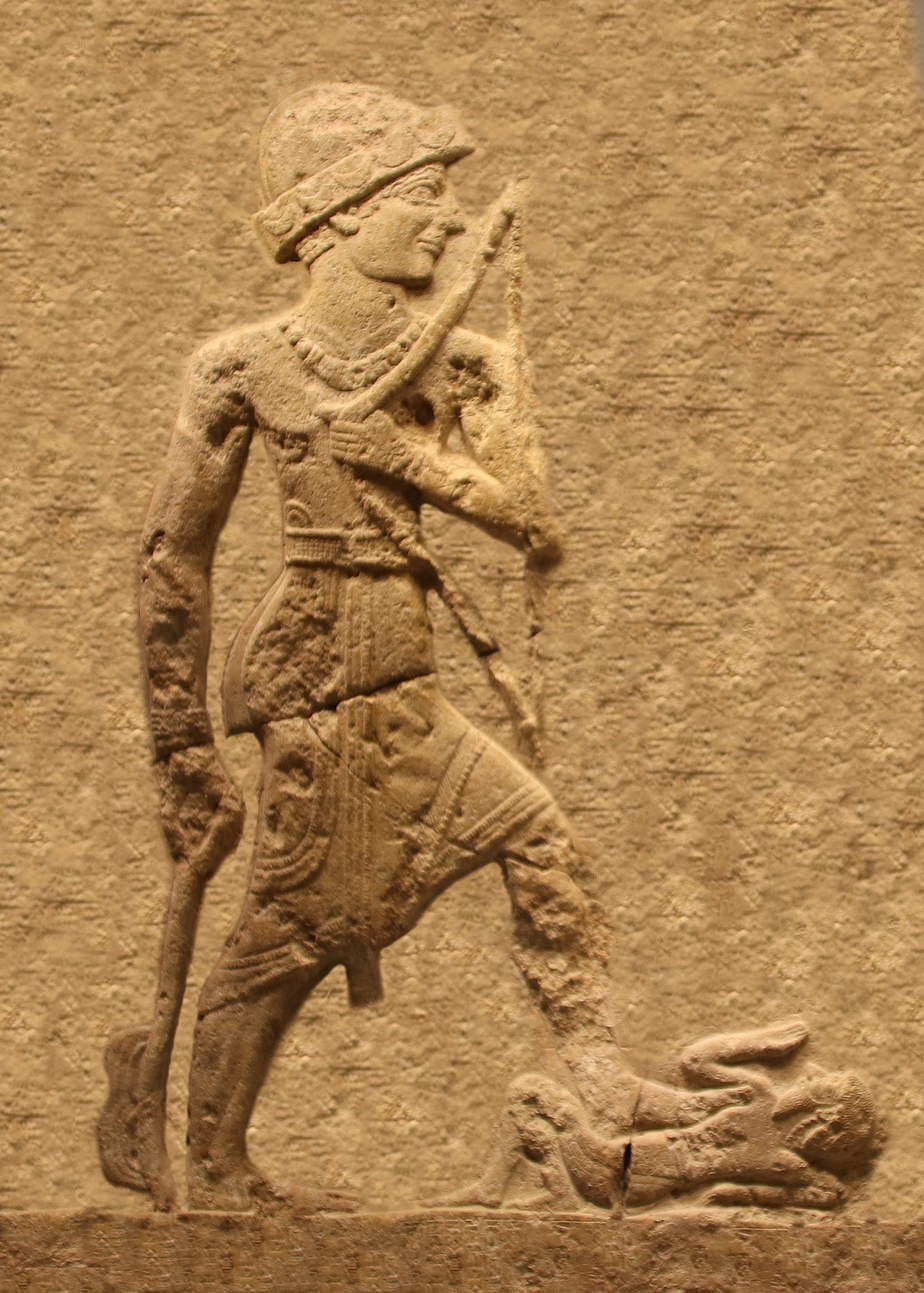
Iddin-Sin, King of Simurrum, armed with a bow and an axe, trampling a foe c. 2000 BC (detail)

The Simurrum Kingdom seems to have been part of a belt of Hurrian city states in the northeastern portion of Mesopotamian area. They were often in conflict with the rulers of Ur III. Mesopotamian sources refer to them as "highlanders".

Several inscriptions suggest that Simurrum was quite powerful, and shed some light on the conflicts around the Zagros area. Four inscriptions and a relief (now in the Israel Museum) of the Simurrum have been identified at Bitwata near Ranya in Iraq, and one that was originally thought to be from Simurrum ruler Iddi(n)-Sin based on a curse formula that was found at Sarpol-e Zahab in Iran but is now known to be of Lullubim ruler (An)Nubanin.

=== Early Bronze Age ===
==== Akkadian Period ====
The Simurrun were regularly in conflict with the Akkadian Empire. The names of four years of the reign of Sargon of Akkad describe his campaigns against Elam, Mari, Simurrum, and Uru'a (an Elamite city-state):

1. Year in which Sargon went to Simurrum
2. Year in which Sargon destroyed Uru'a
3. Year in which Uru'a was destroyed
4. Year in which Sargon destroyed Elam
5. Year in which Mari was destroyed

— Known regnal year names of Sargon.

One unknown year during the reign of the Akkad king Naram-Sin was recorded as "the Year when Naram-Sin was victorious against Simurrum in Kirasheniwe and took prisoner Baba the governor of Simurrum, and Dubul the ensi (ruler) of Arame". Arame is known to be associated with Eshnunna. An Old Babylonian letter also associates Simurrum with Eshnunna. This suggests Simurrum was in the area of that city.

A king, mentioned in The Great Revolt against Narām-Sîn, was ^{m}Pu-ut-ti-ma-da-al.

After Akkad fell to the Gutians, the Lullubians and the Simurrums rebelled against the Gutian ruler Erridupizir, according to the latter's inscriptions:

Ka-Nisba, king of Simurrum, instigated the people of Simurrum and Lullubi to revolt. Amnili, general of [the enemy Lullubi]... made the land [rebel]... Erridu-pizir, the mighty, king of Gutium and of the four quarters hastened [to confront] him... In a single day he captured the pass of Urbillum at Mount Mummum. Further, he captured Nirishuha.

— Inscription R2:226-7 of Erridupizir.

At one point, Simurrum may have become a vassal of the Gutians.

==== Ur III Period ====
The Ur III empire was frequently in conflict with the city. The 44th year name of the second ruler, Shulgi (c. 2094–2046 BC), was "Year Simurrum and Lullubum were destroyed for the ninth time". In one of these conflicts Shulgi captured the ruler of Sumurrum, Tabban-darah, and sent him to exile in Drehem. Sillus-Dagan is known to have been a governor of Simurrum under Ur III at the time of ruler Amar-Sin. It has been suggested that he was an Amorite. Four texts from Drehem with seals mentioning him have been found, including:

"Sillus-Dagan, governor of Simurrum: Ilak-süqir, son of Alu, the chief administrator,(is) your servant."

For a time, Simurrum was in alliance with Ur and a diplomat from Simurrum, Kirib-ulme, is recorded as active during Amar-Sin (c. 2046–2037 BC) years 8 and 9 into Shu-Sin (c. 2037–2028 BC) years 1 and 2. During the rule of Su-Sin in the waning years of the Ur III Empire an administrator assigned to build the Mardu Wall reported "When I sent for word (to the area) between the two mountains it was brought to my attention that the Mardu were camped in the mountains. Simurrum had come to their aid. (Therefore) I proceeded to (the area) "between" the mountain range(s) of Ebih in order to do battle".

Military struggles continues up to the time of the final ruler of Ur III, Ibbi-Sin (c. 2028–2004 BC) with his third year name reporting destroying Simurrum. Simurrum seems to have become independent after the collapse of Ur III.

In order to make peace with a fellow ruler Turukki leader Zaziya (Ur III period) handed over a ruler of Simurrum:

"Zaziya took his children ["grandchildren"] and led them to Zazum of Qutu as hostages (ana yaltiti ... usn). He transported tribute [there]. Zaziya turned him over (ittadinsu) to Zazum of Qutu the king of Simurrum who (once) attended Zazum but had escaped to Zaziya."

=== Middle Bronze Age ===
==== Isin-Larsa period ====
Simmurum is known from writings found at Eshnunna dated to the reign of Isin ruler Ishbi-Erra (c. 2017-1986 BC). Three officials from Simurrum are mentioned, Teheš-atal, Zili-ewri, and Ili-dannu. The ruler of Simurrum at that time was Iddi(n)-Sin, followed by his son Anzabazuna.

Several Kings (𒈗, pronounced Šàr, "Shar", in Akkadian) of Simurrum are known, such as Iddin-Sin and his son Zabazuna. Various inscriptions suggest that they were contemporary with king Ishbi-Erra (c. 1953-1920 BC).

==== Old Babylonian period ====
Accepting the equivalence of Simurrum and Simurru, certainly the later was in the same area, a letter from Shamshi-Adad I of Ekallatum states, in a letter found at Tell Shemshara:

"... About the hostility of Yašub-Addu of Aḫazû. Previously, he followed the leader of Šimurru. He abandoned him to follow the Tirruku leader. He abandoned that ruler to follow the Ya-ilanum tribe. When he abandoned this tribe, he followed me. Me, too, he has abandoned now, and he is ready to follow the ruler of Kakmu ..."

== Rulers of Simurrum ==
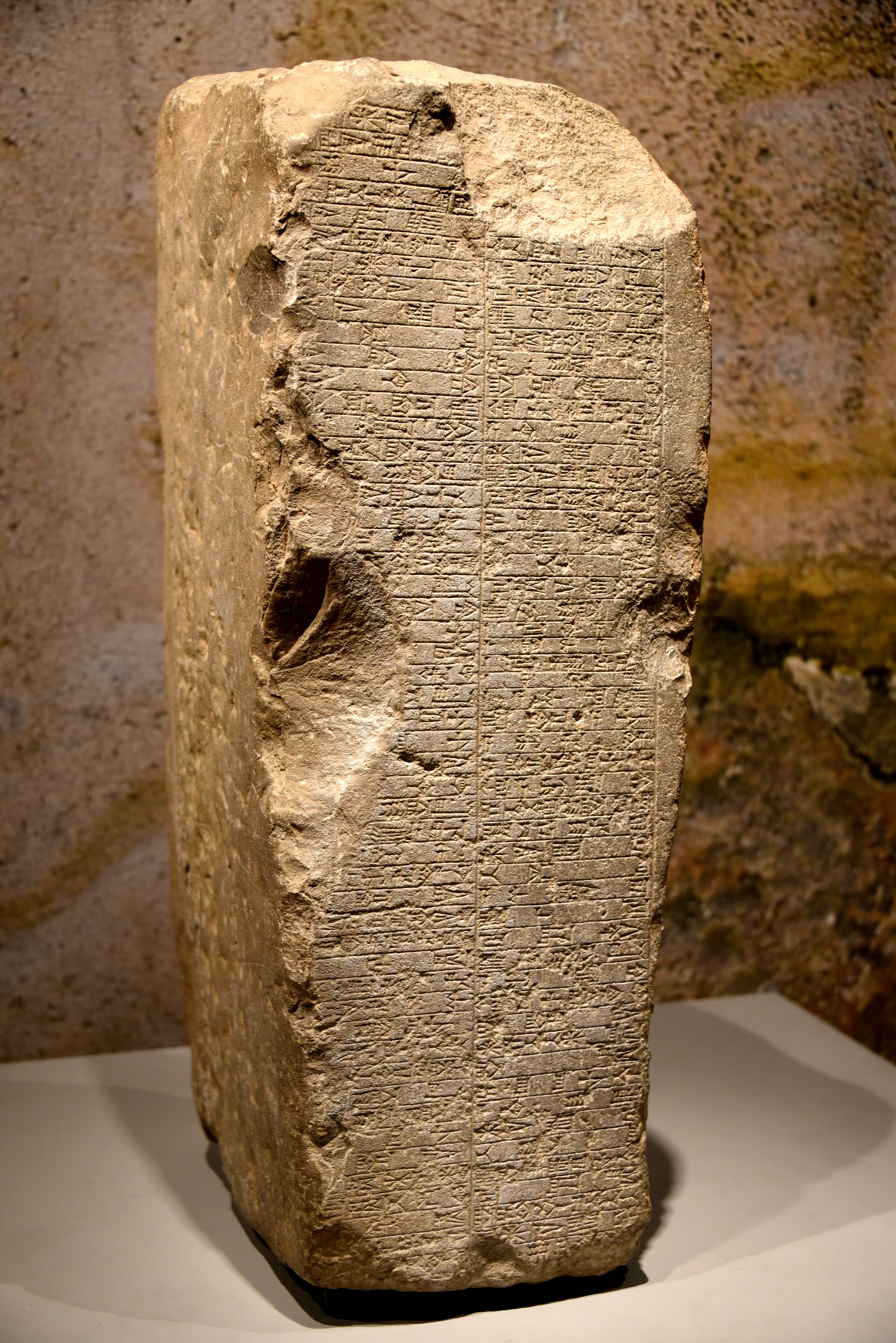
Stela of Iddi-Sin, King of Simurrum. c. 2000 BC, Qarachatan Village, Sulaymaniyah Governorate, Sulaymaniyah Museum, Iraq

The kings and governors of the kingdom or province of Simurrum.

Akkadian Period, Early Bronze IVA

- Ka-Nisba of Simurrum, instigated Simurrum and Lullubi to revolt against the Gutian ruler Erridu-Pizir.

Ur III Period - Early Bronze IVB - Province

- Tabban-darah under Shulgi of Ur III
- Sillus-Dagan under Amar-Sin of Ur III

Kingdom - Middle Bronze I - Independent

- Iddi-Sin
- Zabazuna, son of Iddi-Sin. Another, nonruling, son of Iddi-Sin, Kubbutum, is known from a silver bowl inscription.

== Location ==
There is general agreement that the city lies east of the Tigris River in the valleys and semi-mountainous of the Trans-Tigridian area.

It has been proposed that the city was on the Diyala River (which begins as the Sirwan River in Iran).

An early Assyriologist suggested Simurrum was near "Tell 'Ali" which is not far from mouth of the Lower Zab on its left bank and is on the direct line from Assur to Arrapha (Kirkuk), which it is 42 kilometres (26 mi) west of, saying "The region south of Tell 'Ali has never been examined by archaeologists, but seems to contain numerous ruined towns and canals". Twenty five cuneiform tablets from the Middle Assyrian period were found at the site.

The site of Qala Shirwana, a large mound 30 metres (98 ft) tall with an additional 10-metre (33 ft) citadel at the top in the southern basin of the Diyala river, on its west bank, near the modern town of Kalar, has been suggested as the site of Simurrum. The upper mound has an area of 5.5 hectares. While the site is completely built over now, early satellite photographs indicate that there was a 100 hectare lower town. Second millennium BC pottery is often found during construction.

Altun Kupri, on the Little Zab river, has also been suggested.

A complication is that when a city-state captured large numbers of soldiers etc. they were sometimes placed in rural settlements named after their origin, a practice that continued into Neo-Babylonian times. There were settlements near Girsu/Lagash named Lullubu(na) and Šimurrum for example.

== Karaḫar ==
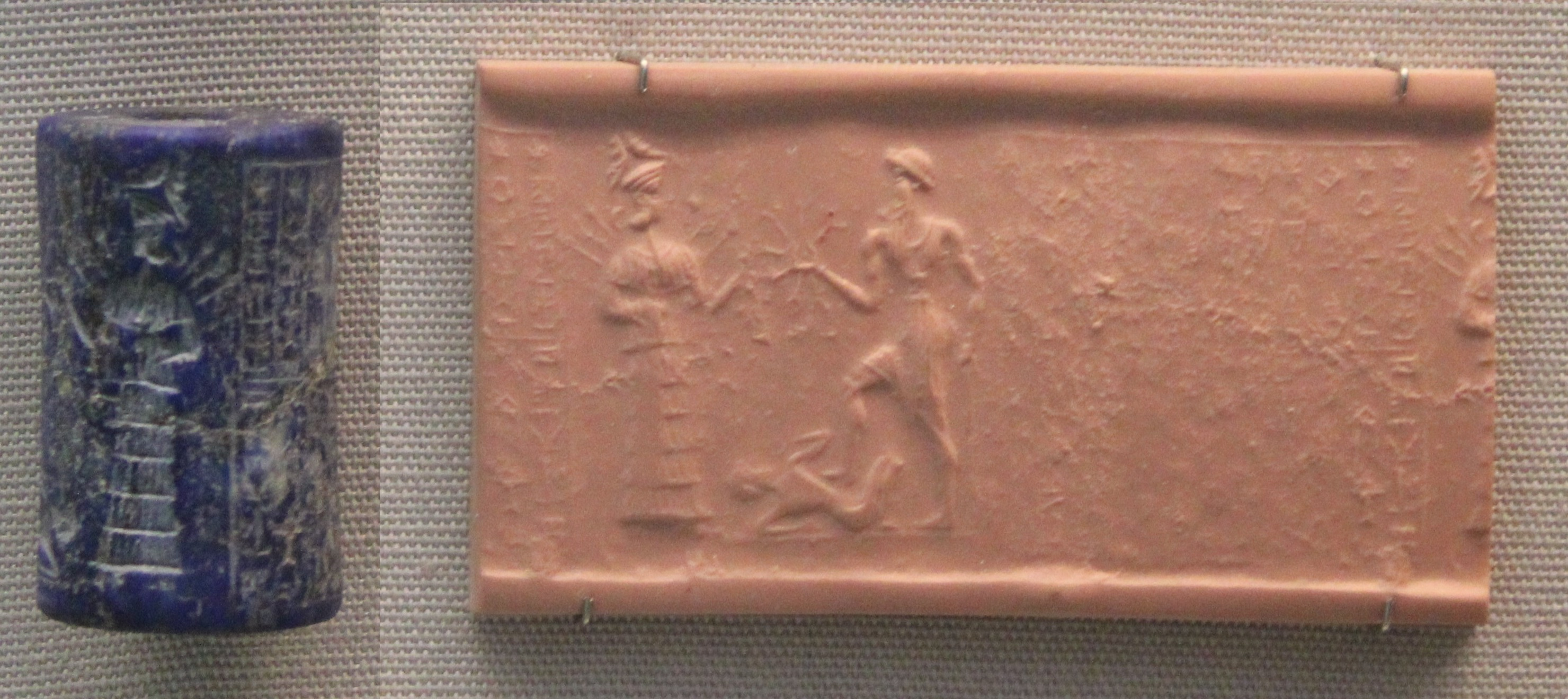
Cylinder seal of Zardamu

The as yet unlocated city of Karaḫar (also Qarahar and Harahar) is known mainly from the Ur III period. A number of texts closely link Karaḫar and Simurrum and they are thought to be in the same area. Karaḫar is thought to be between Simurrum and Eshnunna and near Hamazi and Pašime, possibly on the Alwand River, a tributary of the Diyala river, in the Zagros mountain foothills. It is known to have been a major producer of sesame.

The second Ur III ruler, Sulgi (c. 2094–2046 BC) reports defeating/destroying Karaḫar in his year names S24 "Year: Karahar was destroyed", S31 "Year: Karaḫar was defeated for the second time", and in S45 "Year: Šulgi, the strong man, the king of Ur, the king of the four-quarters, smashed the heads of Urbilum, Simurrum, Lullubum and Karahar in a single campaign". Two ensis (governors) of Karaḫar under the Ur III empire are known, Ea-rabi and Arad-Nanna. During the reign the fourth ruler of the Ur III dynasty Shu-Sin (c. 2037–2028 BC) it is known that the military governor of the nearby city of Pašime was a Arad-Nanna though it is not known if that was the same person. Also in the Ur III period a Arad-Nanna was a ruler of Hamazi. Also during the reign of Shu-Sin, a Ir-Nanna is recorded as being "... military governor of Usar-Garsana, general of Basime, governor of Sabum and the land of Gutebum, general of Dimat-Enlila, governor of Al-Sü-Sîn, general of Urbillum, governor of Ham(a)zi and Karahar, general of NI.HI, general of Simaski and the land of Karda ...", showing those polities were in the same area.

A Tiš-atal (also Tish-atal/Tehes-atal/Diš-atal/Ankiš-atal) is recorded as ruling Karaḫar toward the end of the Ur III empire. A Tish-atal also ruled Urkish in that period but is not known if it was the same person.

A lapis lazuli seal of Zardamu, king of Karaḫar from the Ur III period, reads "^{d}Zardamu, sun-god of his land; beloved of the god Nergal, his (personal) deity; Annunïtum (is) his mother ... mighty king, king of Karaḫar, and king of the four quarters, spouse of the goddess Estar". Note that this identifies him as being deified and is in the style of major rulers such as Naram-Sin of Akkad. The seals iconography shows Zardamu with "double-axe, a multiple mace, and treading on an enemy before Ištar, who offers him the same regalia".

A carnelian cylinder seal appeared on the antiquities market reading "Keleš-atal, king of Karaḫar: Balalatum (is your) wife."

In the Old Babylonian period texts linked Karaḫar administratively with Me-Turan which lies in the area thought to hold Karaḫar.

== See also ==
- Cities of the ancient Near East
- List of Mesopotamian deities
- List of Mesopotamian dynasties
