= 18th century BC =

One hundred years, from 1800 BC to 1701 BC

The 18th century BC was the century that lasted from 1800 BC to 1701 BC. Manning (2008) tentatively estimates the world population in 1799 BC as 85 million.

== Events ==
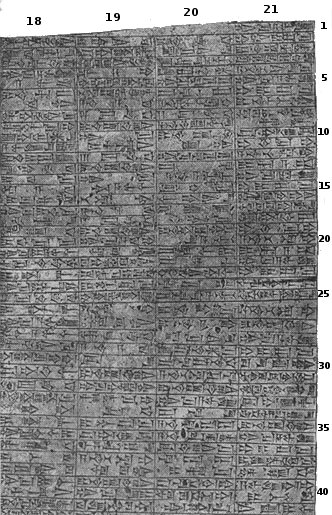
An inscription of the Code of Hammurabi, one of the earliest known sets of laws

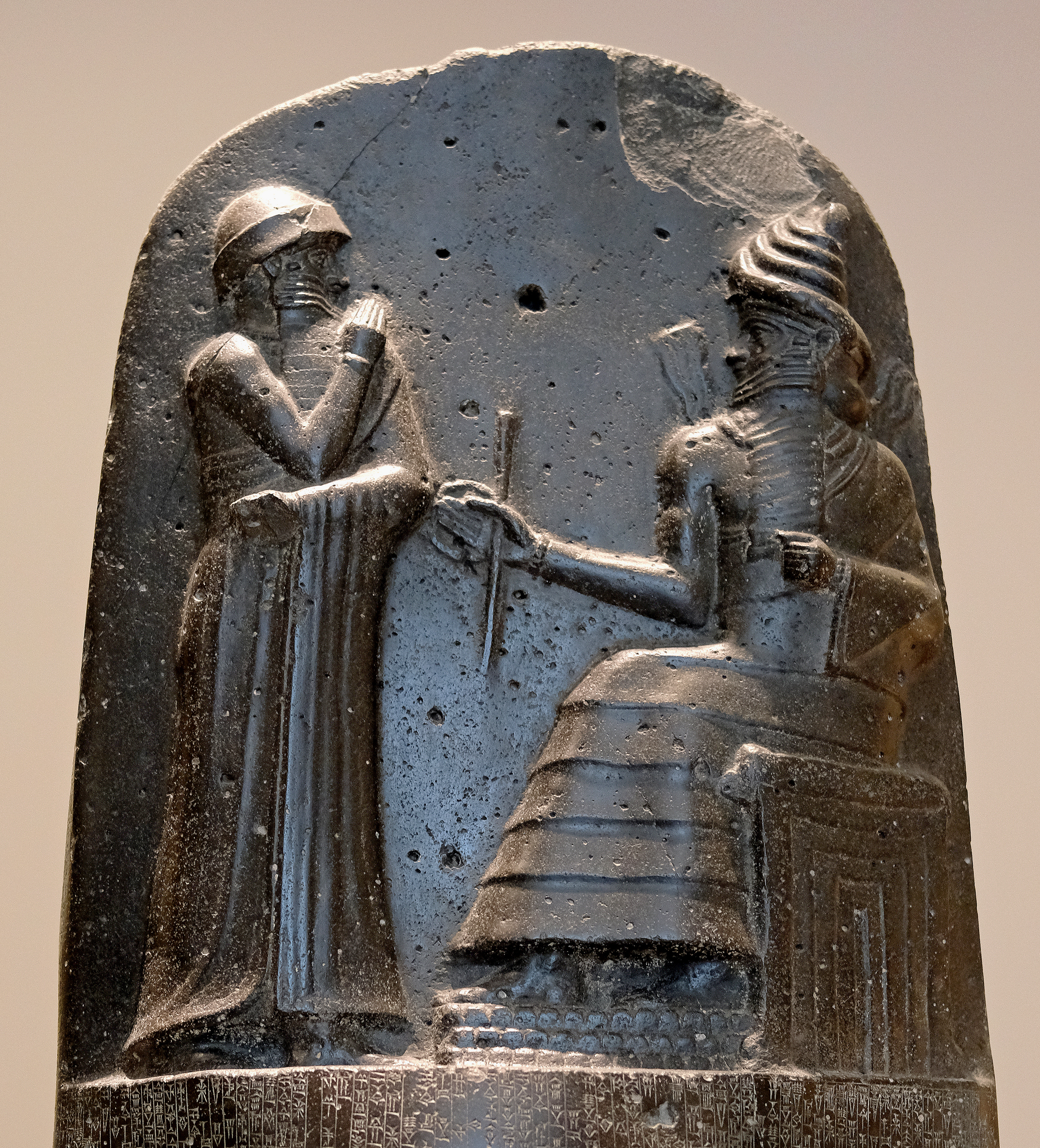
Stele depicting Hammurabi (standing), who ascended to the Babylonian throne in c. 1792.

- 1800 BC: Beginning of the Nordic Bronze Age in the period system devised by Oscar Montelius.
- c. 1800 BC: Sedentary Mayan communities in Mesoamerica
- c. 1800 BC: Hyksos start to settle in the Nile Delta. They had the capital at Avaris in northeastern Nile Delta.
- 1800 BC: Adichanallur urn-burial site in Tirunelveli district in Tamil Nadu. In 2004, a number of skeletons dating from around 3,800 years ago.
- 1800 BC: Beginning of the Indo-Aryan migration
- 1800 BC – 1700 BC: Decline of the Indus Valley Civilisation
- 1800 BC – 1300 BC: Troy VI flourishes.
- c. 1792 BC – 1750 BC: (middle chronology) – Hammurabi rules Babylonia and has to deal with Mari, which he conquers late in his career.
- c. 1792 BC – 1750 BC: (middle chronology) – Stela of Hammurabi, from Susa (modern Shush, Iran) is made. It is now in Musée du Louvre, Paris.
- 1787 BC – 1784 BC: Amorite conquests of Uruk and Isin.
- 1786 BC: Egypt: Queen Sobekneferu dies. End of Twelfth Dynasty, start of Thirteenth Dynasty, start of Fourteenth Dynasty.
- 1779 BC: Zimrilim, the King of Mari, starts to rule.
- 1775 BC to 1760 BC: Investiture of Zimri-Lim, a painting of Zimri-Lim receiving the ring and staff from the goddess Ishtar, is made at the Royal Palace of Mari, Court 106. It is now at the Louvre, Paris.
- 1770 BC: Babylon, capital of Babylonia becomes the largest city of the world, taking the lead from Thebes, capital of Egypt.
- 1766 BC: Shang conquest of the Xia dynasty. China.
- 1764 BC – 1750 BC: Wars of Hammurabi.
- 1757 BC: Mari sacked by Hammurabi. Zimrilim's palace is destroyed.
- 1757 BC: Zimrilim, the King of Mari, dies.
- 1750 BC: Hyksos occupation of Northern Egypt.
- 1750 BC: Old Assyrian Empire disestablished
- 1750 BC: A colossal volcanic eruption at Mount Veniaminof, located on the Alaska Peninsula.
- c. 1750 BC: Hammurabi dies and is succeeded by his son, Samsu-iluna, who is already involved in Babylonian government.
- c. 1750 BC: Vedic period starts in India.
- c. 1750 BC: Investiture of Zimrilim (Zimrilim, King of Mari, before the Goddess Ishtar), facsimile of a wall painting on mud plaster from the Zimrilim palace at Mari (modern Tell Hariri, Syria), Court 106, is made. It is now in Musée du Louvre, Paris.
- c. 1750 BC: The complaint tablet to Ea-nāṣir is written.
- c. 1740 BC – c. 1720 BC: reigns of pharaoh Neferhotep I and his brother Sobekhotep IV, marking the apex of the Egyptian 13th Dynasty.
- 1749 BC – 1712 BC: Mesopotamian Rebellions.
- 1749 BC: Samsu-iluna succeeds Hammurabi as king of Babylon. However, his rule is not very effective, and Mesopotamia endures turmoil during his reign.
- c. 1740 BC: Akkadian-Assyrian governor Puzur-Sin drives the Babylonians and Amorites into the north, out of the land of Assyria.
- 1736 BC: According to the ultra-long chronology of the ancient Near East, this is the year the sack of Babylon occurred.
- c. 1720 BC: The Hyksos invade and conquer Egypt, establishing their capital at Avaris.
- c. 1720 BC: Adasi, a native king of Assyria, seizes power.
- 1712 BC: According to the middle chronology, Samsu-iluna dies and is succeeded by Abi-Eshuh.
- c. 1700 BC: Unetice culture, beginning of the Bronze Age in Central Europe.
- c. 1700 BC: Minoan civilization: phase II of the Middle period (MM II).
- c. 1700 BC: The last species of mammoth became extinct on Wrangel Island.
- c. 1700 BC: Indus Valley Civilization comes to an end but is continued by the Cemetery H culture
- c. 1700 BC: Minoan Old Palace period ends and Minoan Second Palace (Neopalatial) period starts in Crete.
- c. 1700 BC: Aegean metalworkers are producing decorative objects rivaling those of Ancient Near East jewelers, whose techniques they seem to borrow.
- c. 1700 BC: Lila-Ir-Tash started to rule the Elamite Empire.
- c. 1700 BC: Bronze Age starts in China.
- c. 1700 BC: Shang dynasty starts in China.
- c. 1700 BC: Knossos on Crete is destroyed by fire.
- c. 1700 BC: Oxus civilization ends in today's Central Asia.

== Deaths ==
- 1764 BC: Yarim Lim 1 The Great King of Yamhad
- c. 1750 BC: Hammurabi (middle chronology)

== Inventions, discoveries, introductions ==
- c. 1700 BC: Median date for the building of the Phaistos Disc. Its purpose and meaning, and even its original geographical place of manufacture remains unknown, making it one of the most famous mysteries of archaeology.

== Significant people ==
- Adasi, usurper king of Assyria
- Ameny Qemau, Thirteenth Dynasty Pharaoh of Egypt (1793–1791 BC)
- Hammurabi, ruler of Babylon beginning in 1728 BC (according to the short chronology); or from around 1792 to 1750 BC
- Hotepibre, Thirteenth Dynasty Pharaoh of Egypt (1791–1788 BC)
- Jie of Xia, last ruler of the Xia dynasty, begins ruling around 1706 BC
- Jin of Xia, semi-legendary Xia dynasty King of China (1810–1789 BC)
- Lila-Ir-Tash, king of the Elamite Empire
- Nur-Adad, king of Larsa from 1801 to 1785 BC
- Rim-Sin I, ruler of the Middle Eastern city-state of Larsa since 1758 BC, according to the short chronology. That same chronology records his death in 1699 BC.
- Samsu-iluna, king of Babylon since 1750 BC, according to the middle chronology
- Sekhemkare, Thirteenth Dynasty Pharaoh of Egypt (1796–1793 BC)
- Shamshi-Adad I, Amorite King of Assyria (1809–1776 BC) (Middle Chronology)
- Shibtu, queen of Zimri-Lim throughout his reign
- Sonbef, Thirteenth Dynasty Pharaoh of Egypt (1800–1796 BC)
- Sin-Muballit, King of Babylon (1813–1792 BC) (Middle Chronology)
- Sumu-la-El, king of Babylon from around 1817 to 1781 BC
- Yarim-Lim I, king of the Amorite kingdom of Yamhad in present-day Syria, from around 1780 to 1764 BC
- Zimri-Lim, king of the Middle Eastern city-state of Mari from around 1775 to 1761 BC
