= Statue of Ebih-Il =

Ancient Syrian icon (c. 2400 BC)

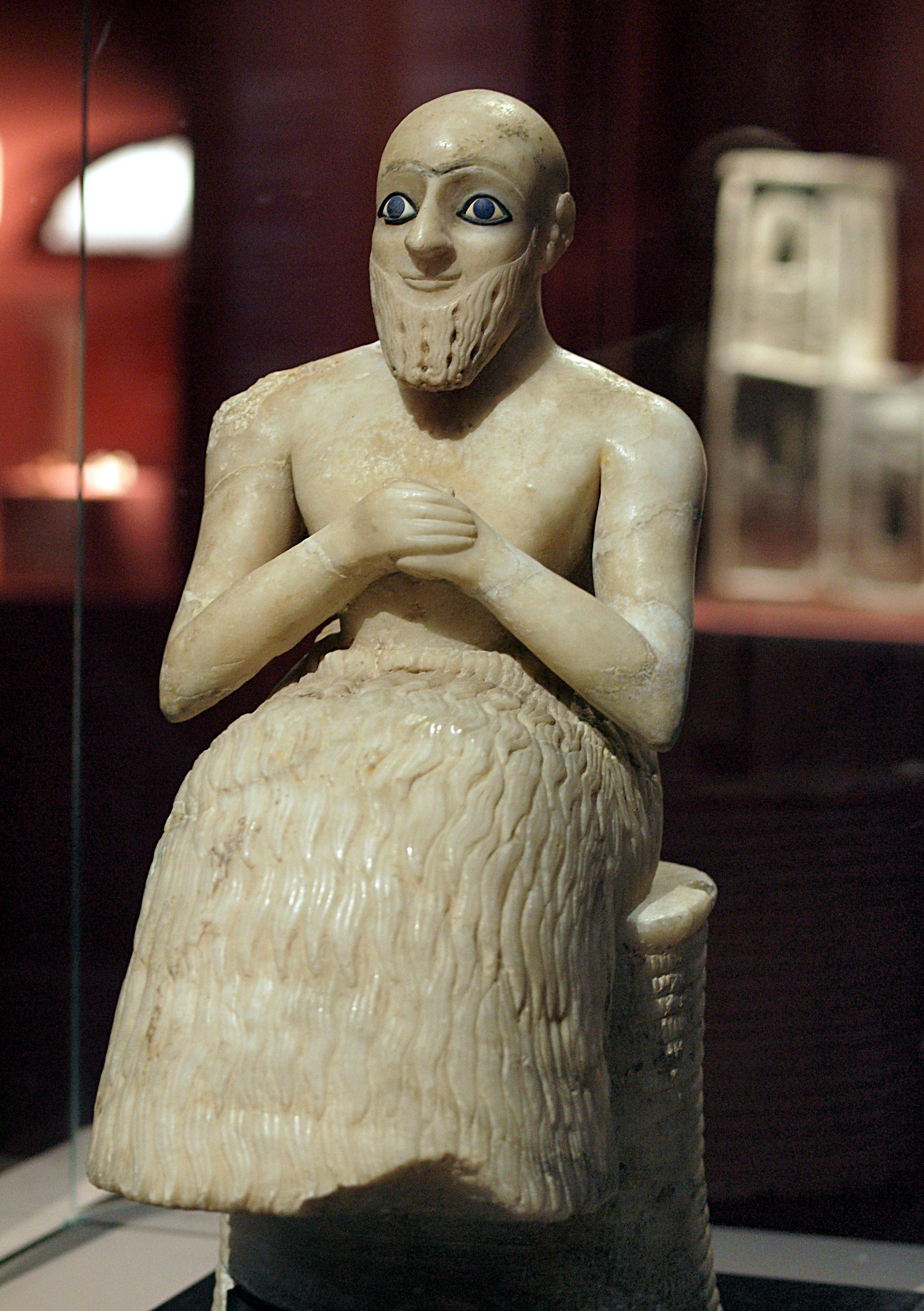
- Statue of Ebih-Il, superintendent of Mari
- Material: Alabaster, shells, lapis lazuli, bitumen
- Height: 52.5 centimetres (20.7 in)
- Width: 20.6 centimetres (8.1 in)
- Depth: 30 centimetres (12 in)
- Created: c. 2400 BC
- Period/culture: Sumerian
- Discovered: 1934
- Place: Temple of Ishtar, Mari, Syria
- Present location: Musée du Louvre, Paris; Heilongjiang Art Museum, Harbin (downsized replica)
- Identification: AO 17551

Location
- The Statue of Ebih-Il was discovered in Mari, modern Syria

The Statue of Ebih-Il is a 25th-century BC statue of the praying figure of Ebih-Il (𒂗𒋾𒅋, EN-TI-IL, e-bih-il), superintendent of the ancient city-state of Mari in modern eastern Syria. The statue was discovered at the Temple of Ishtar in Mari during excavations directed by French archaeologist André Parrot. It is made of gypsum, with inlays of schist, shells and lapis lazuli. The statue is displayed in the Musée du Louvre. It has been described as "a masterpiece by virtue of its craftsmanship, state of preservation, and expressive style."

== Overview ==
The statue, made of translucent smooth alabaster, depicts the figure of a man seated on a wicker hassock. He is shown in a praying posture with hands clasped against his chest conveying his devotion to the deity.

The man's head is shaved. His long beard is composed of vertical curls and has drilled holes drilled formerly inlaid with another, now-lost material. The beard accentuates the figure's cheeks and finely sculpted lips that convey a half-smile. The figure's staring blue eyes were crafted with particular care and detail. Flakes of schist, shells and lapis lazuli form the eyelashes and eyelids, cornea and iris, respectively. The lapis lazuli inlays were imported from as far east as Afghanistan.

The figure has a bare torso and thin waist. The hands are clasped against the chest, with the left hand closed and placed inside the right hand. The figure's only dress is the Sumerian-style ceremonial kaunakes skirt. This elaborate fleece skirt appears to be made from animal hide (probably sheepskin or goatskin) as evidenced by the presence of a tail at the back. The figure's feet are missing but their attachment piece is still showing under the dress.

The inscription in proto-cuneiform signs on the rear, which identifies the work, reads: "Statue of Ebih-Il, the superintendent, dedicated to Ishtar Virile."

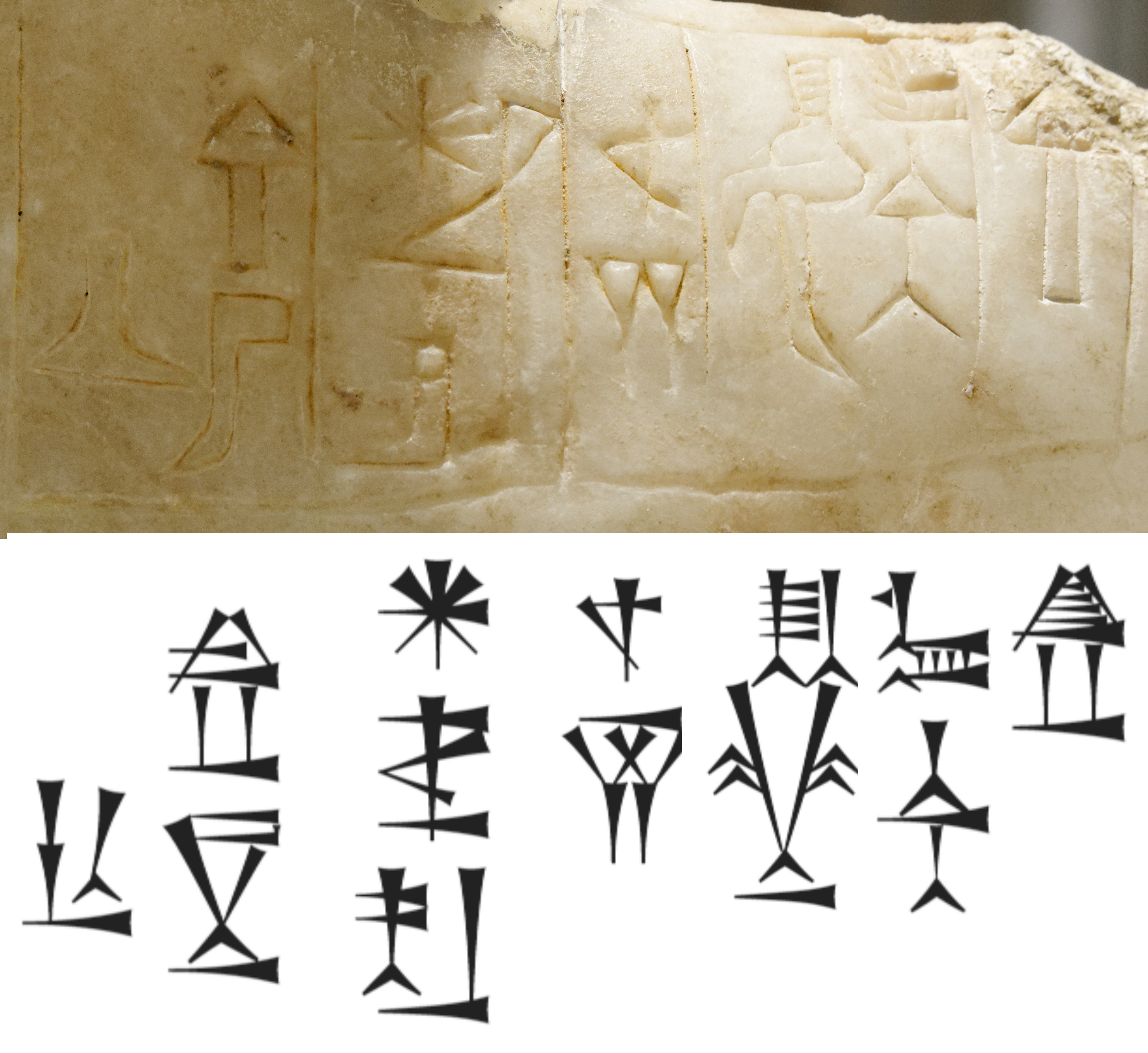

𒊨 𒂗𒋾𒅋 𒉡𒌉 𒀭𒈹𒍑 𒊕𒄸𒁺
dul, Ebih-il, nu-banda, ^{d}Ištar Nita, sarig
"This statue, Ebih-il, the overseer, to Ishtar (?), he dedicated"

— Inscription on the statue of Ebib-Il.

== Excavation ==
The statue was discovered in two parts by a French excavation team under André Parrot. The head was found on the pavement of the outer court of the Temple of Ishtar, and a few meters away the body along with a smaller statue of King Lamgi-Mari. The left arm and elbow were broken, and the base of the right elbow was shattered. The statues were the first major discovery of the Mari excavations started winter 1933, the head found 22 January 1934, the body 23 January 1934.

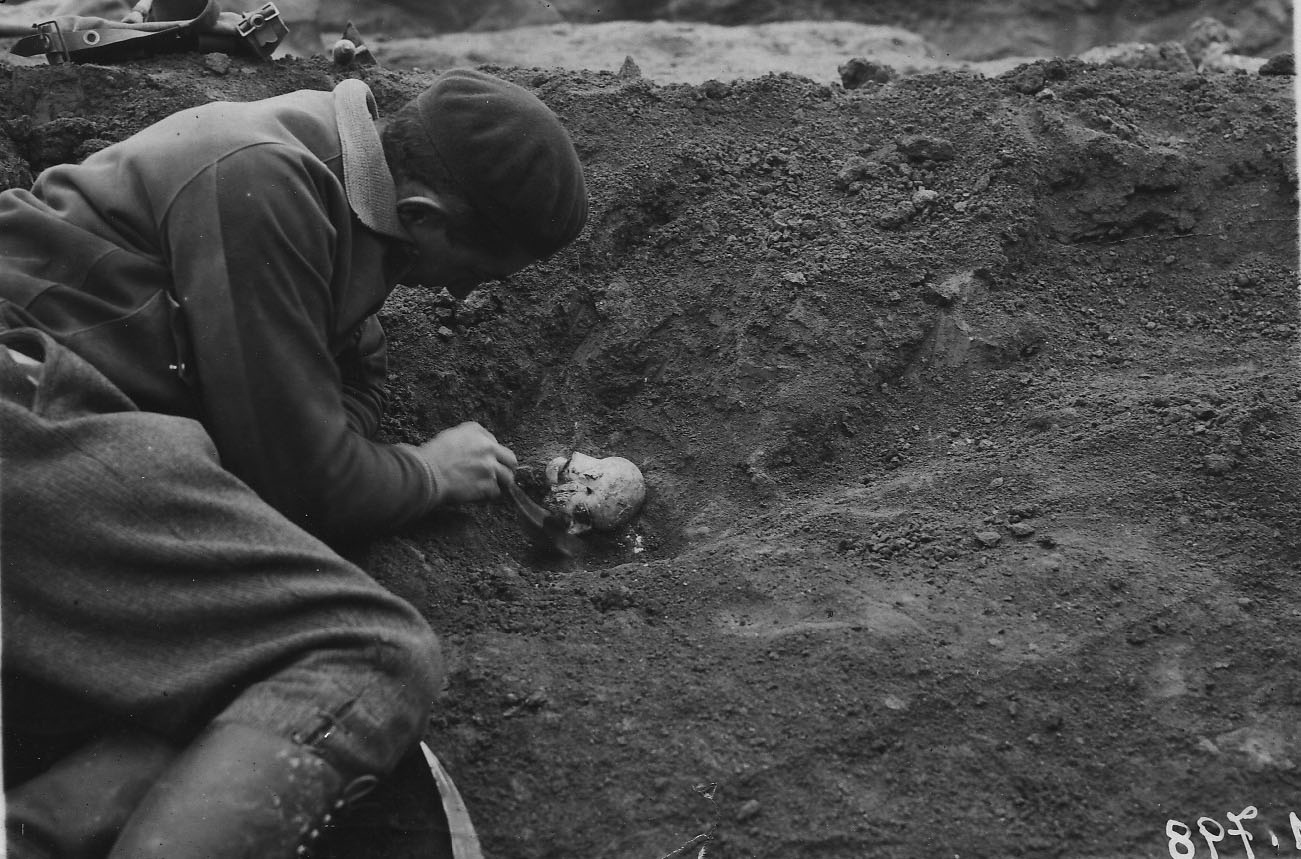
Excavation of the head of Ebih-Il (22 January 1934)

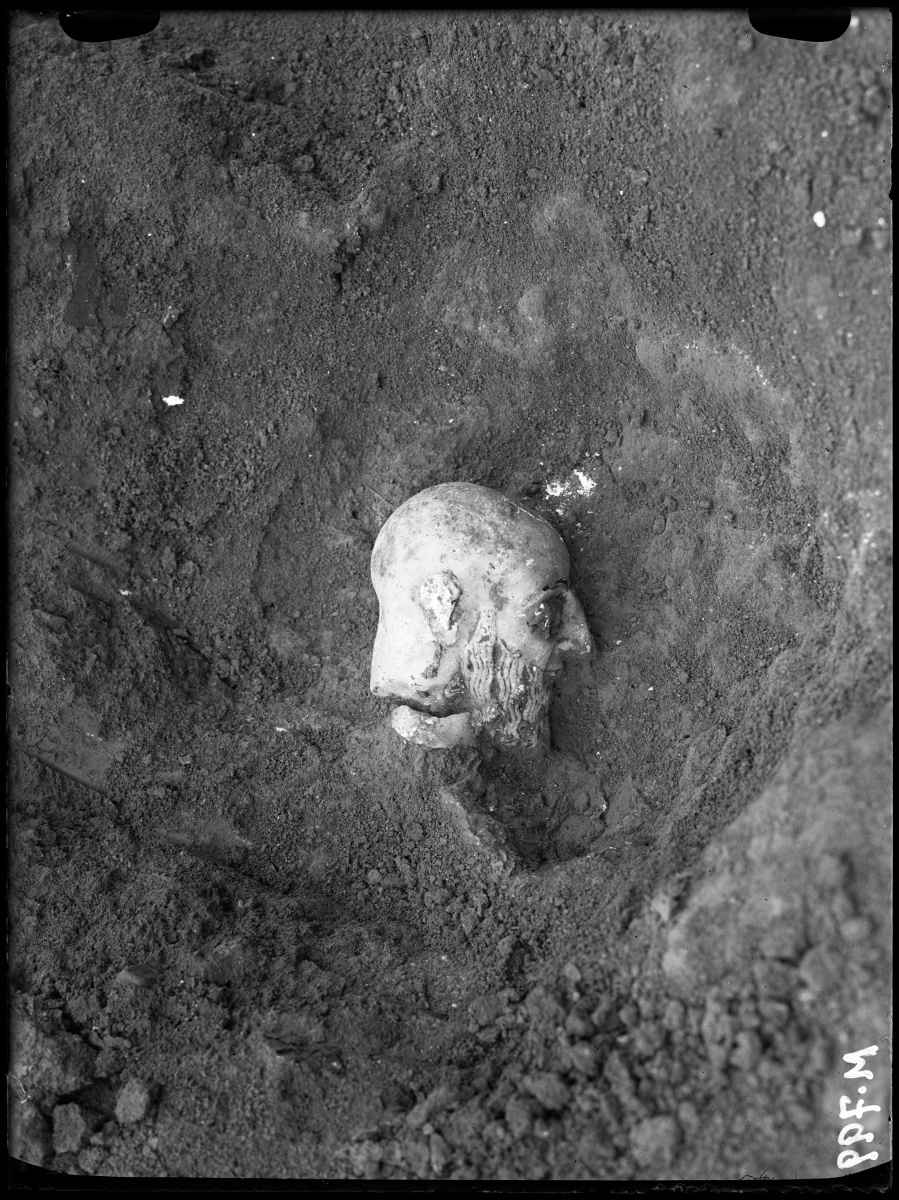
Head of Ebih-Il (discovery, 22 January 1934)

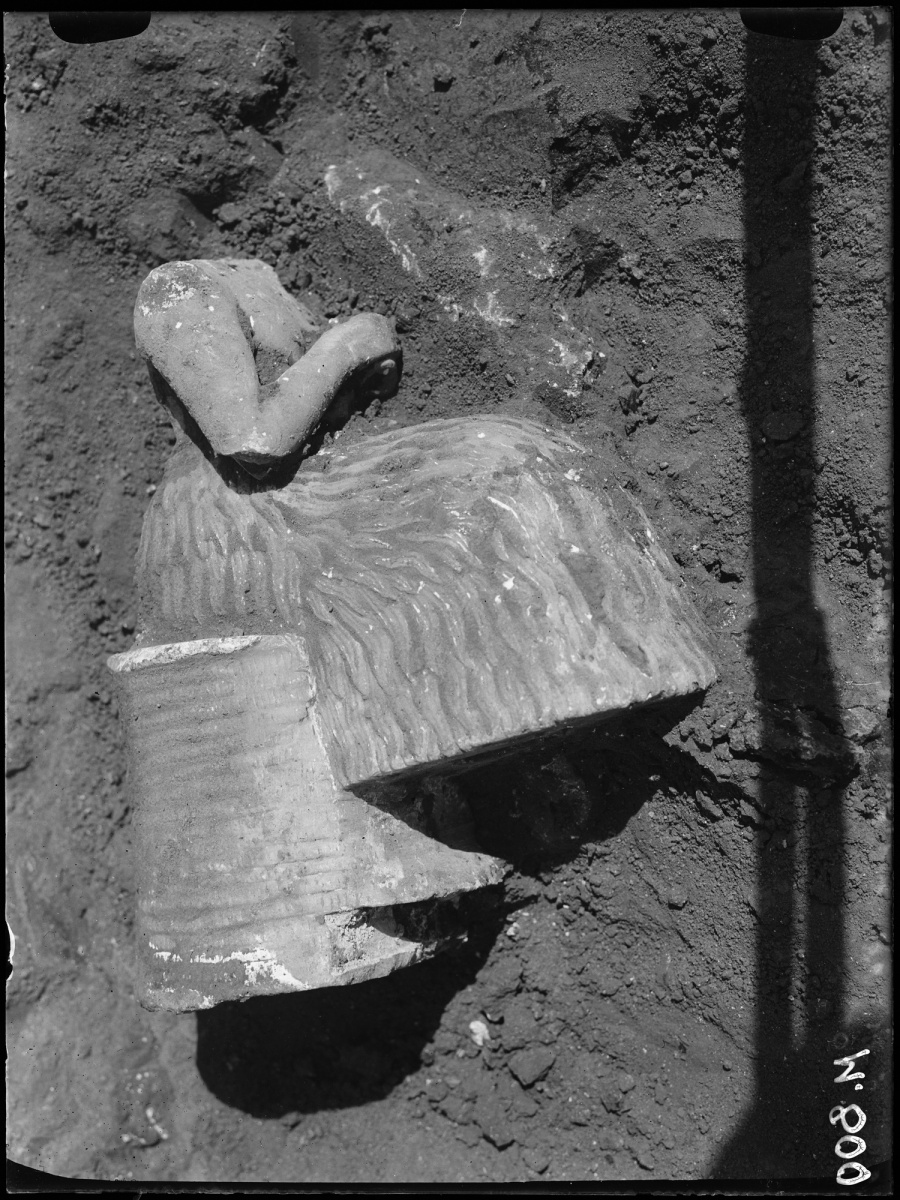
Body of Ebih-Il (discovery, 23 January 1934)

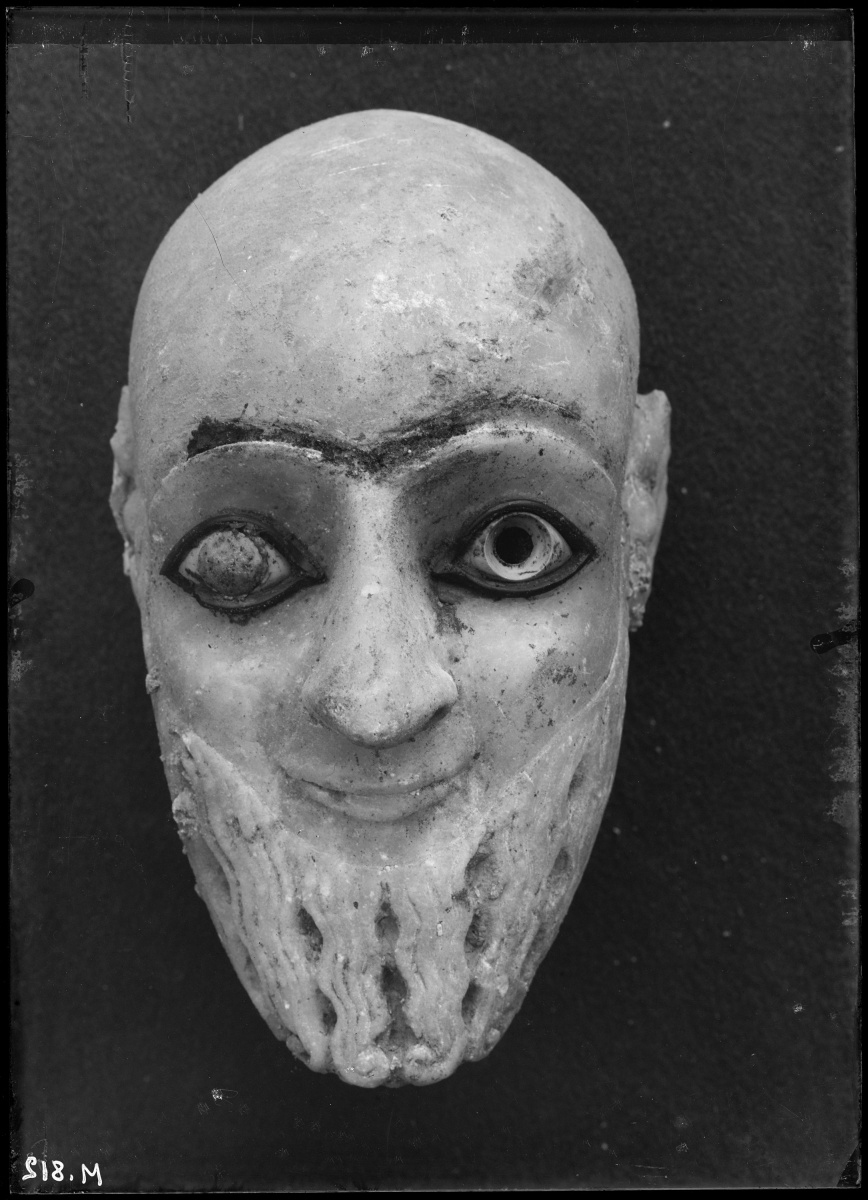
Head of Ebih-Il upon discovery

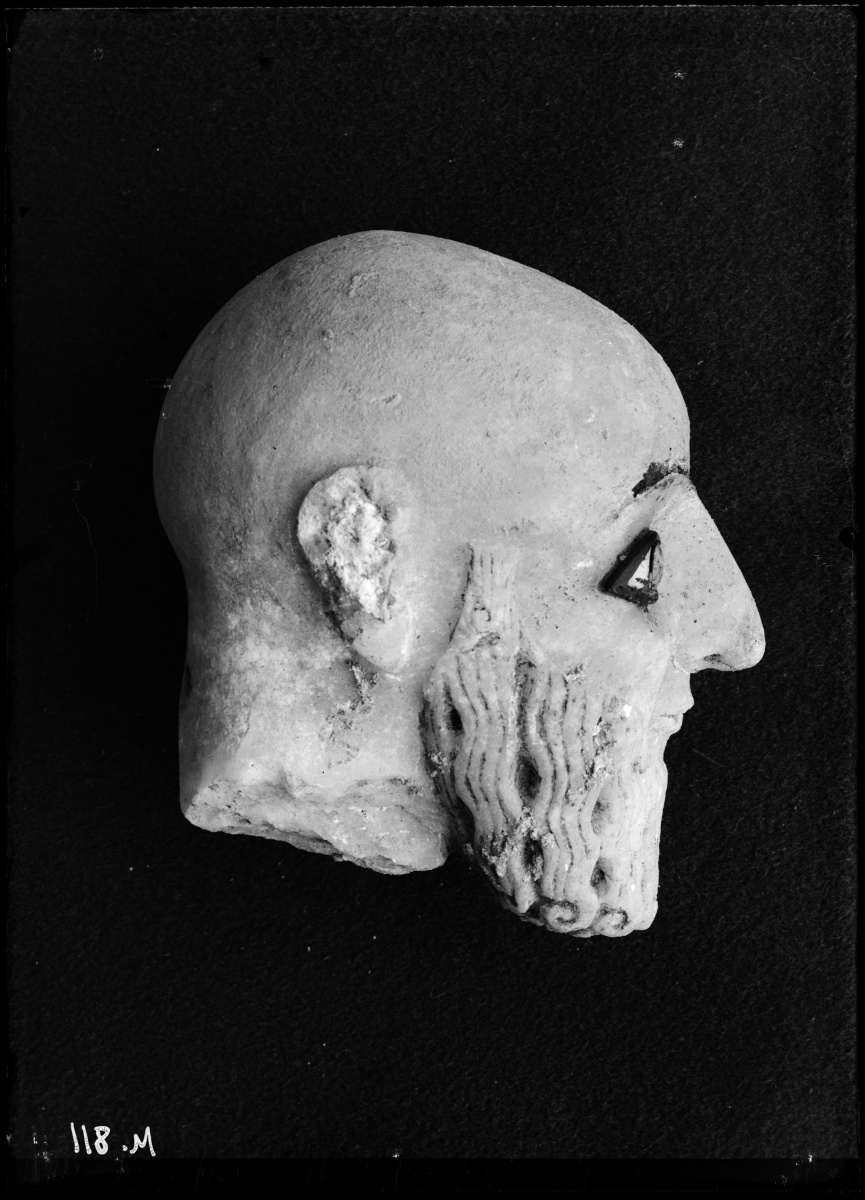
Head of Ebih-Il upon discovery (profile)

== Details of the statue ==
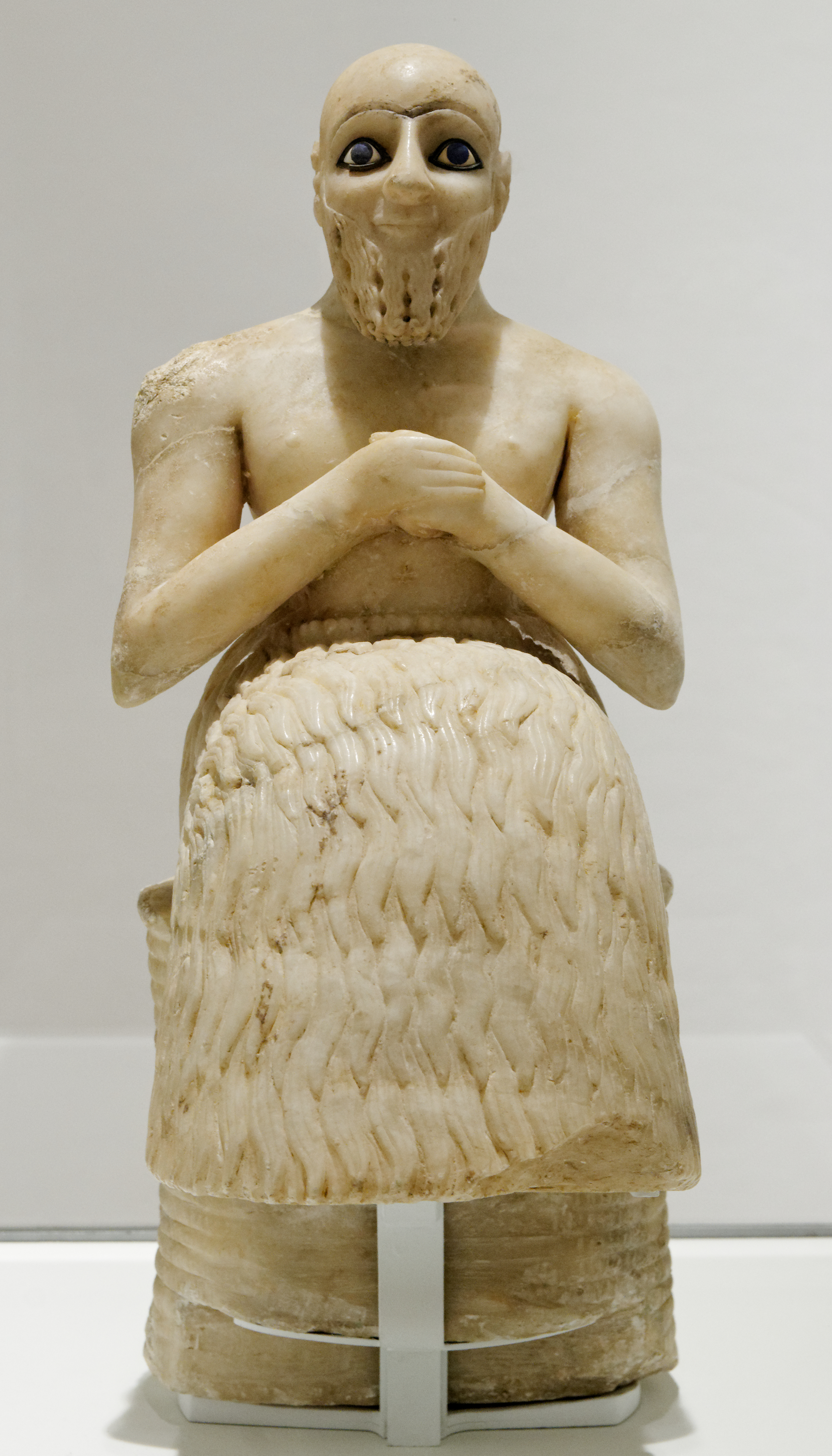
Ebih-Il in the Louvre, AO17551

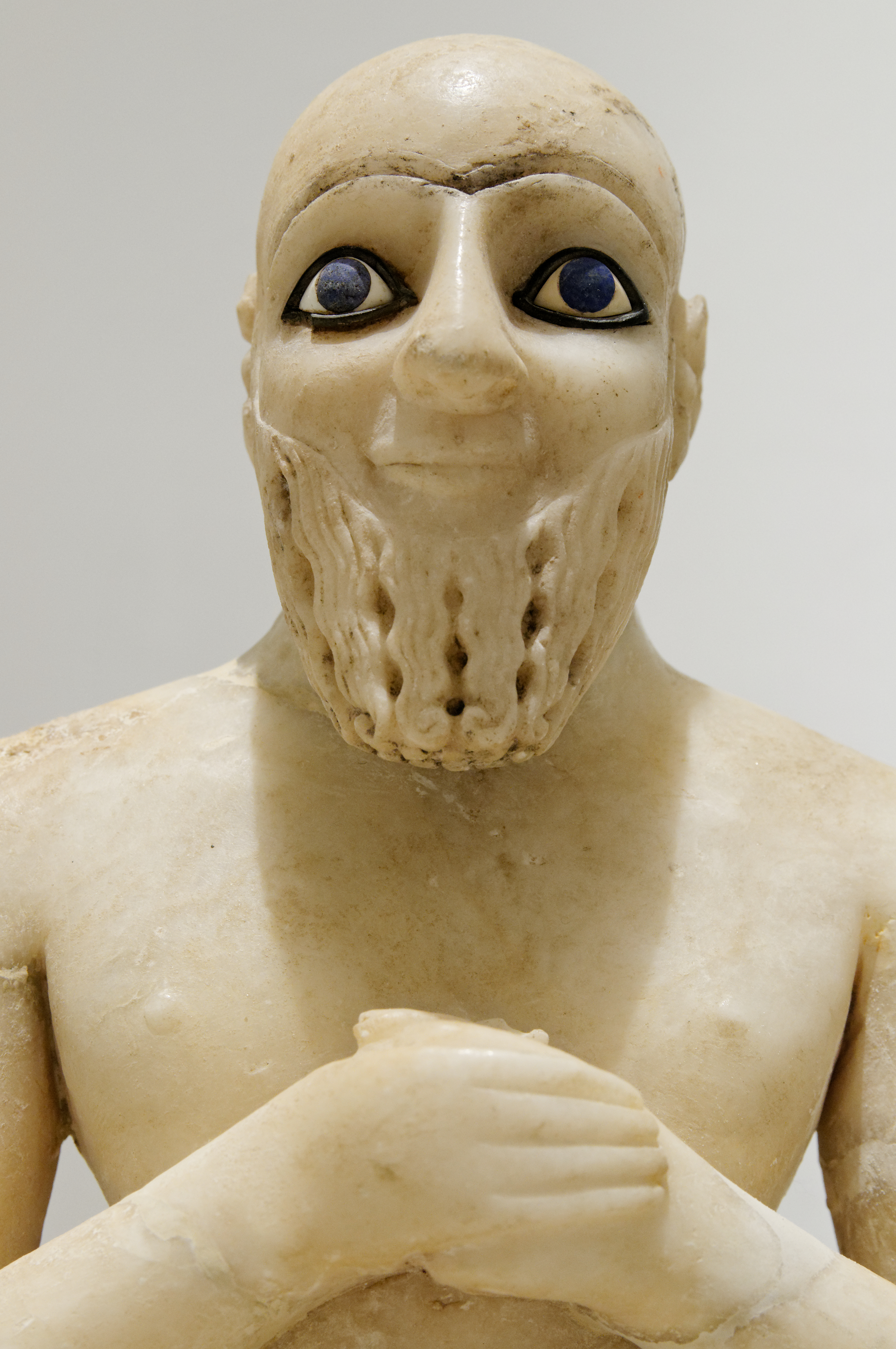
The figure's facial expressions. The figure's hands are clasped in prayer

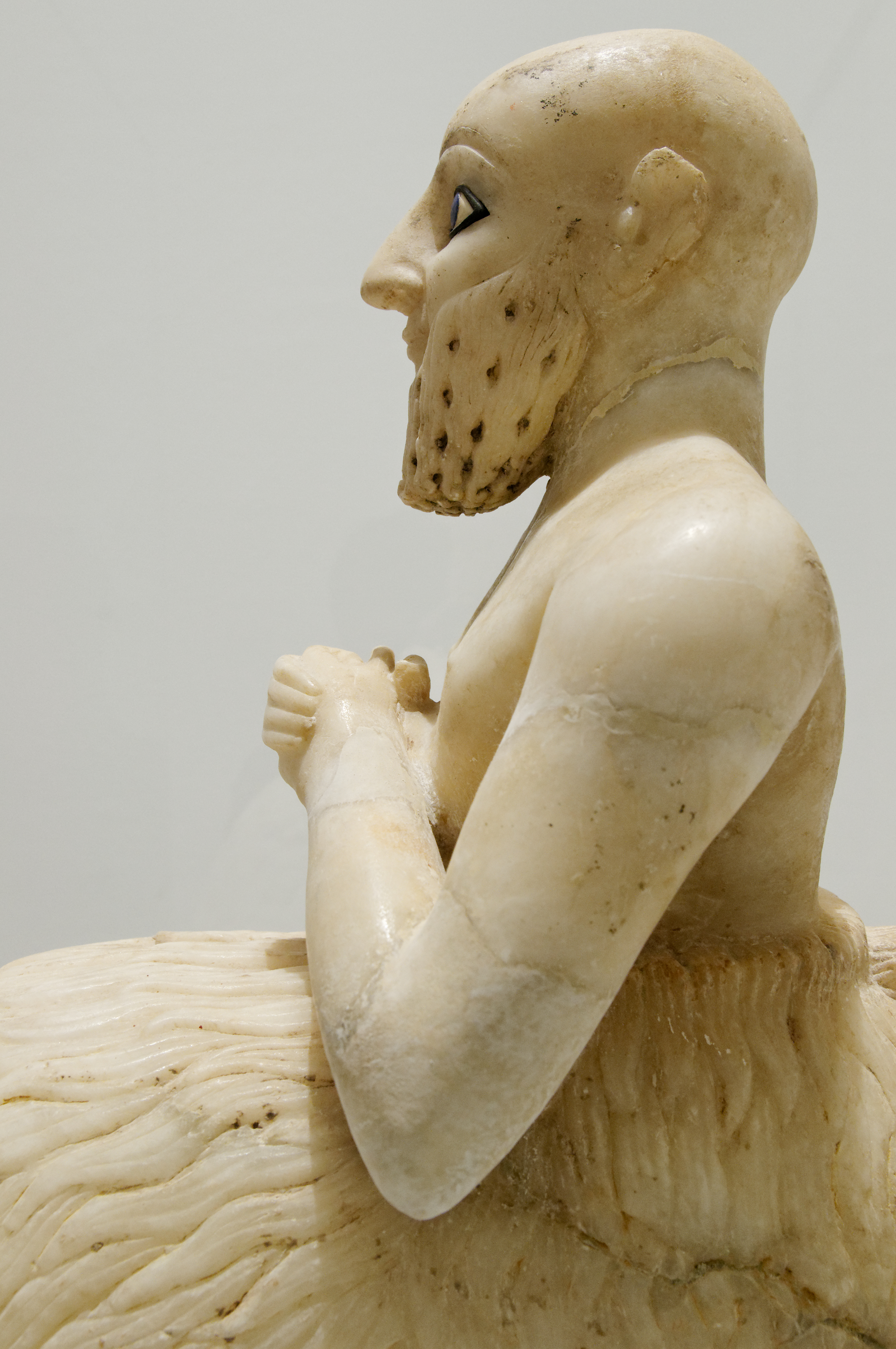
A profile of the statue showing the seated posture and the kaunakes skirt

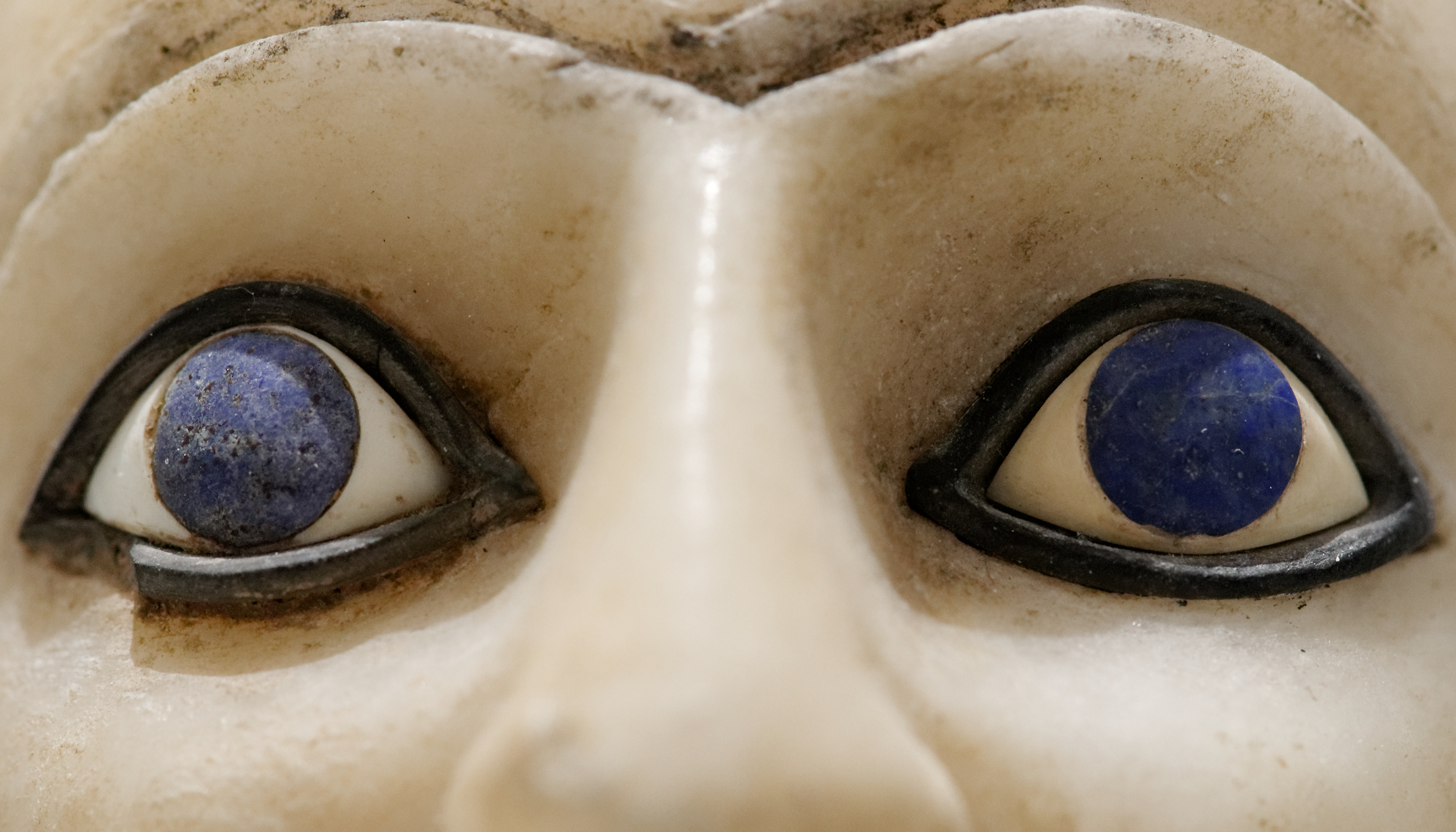
A closeup of the finely crafted eyes

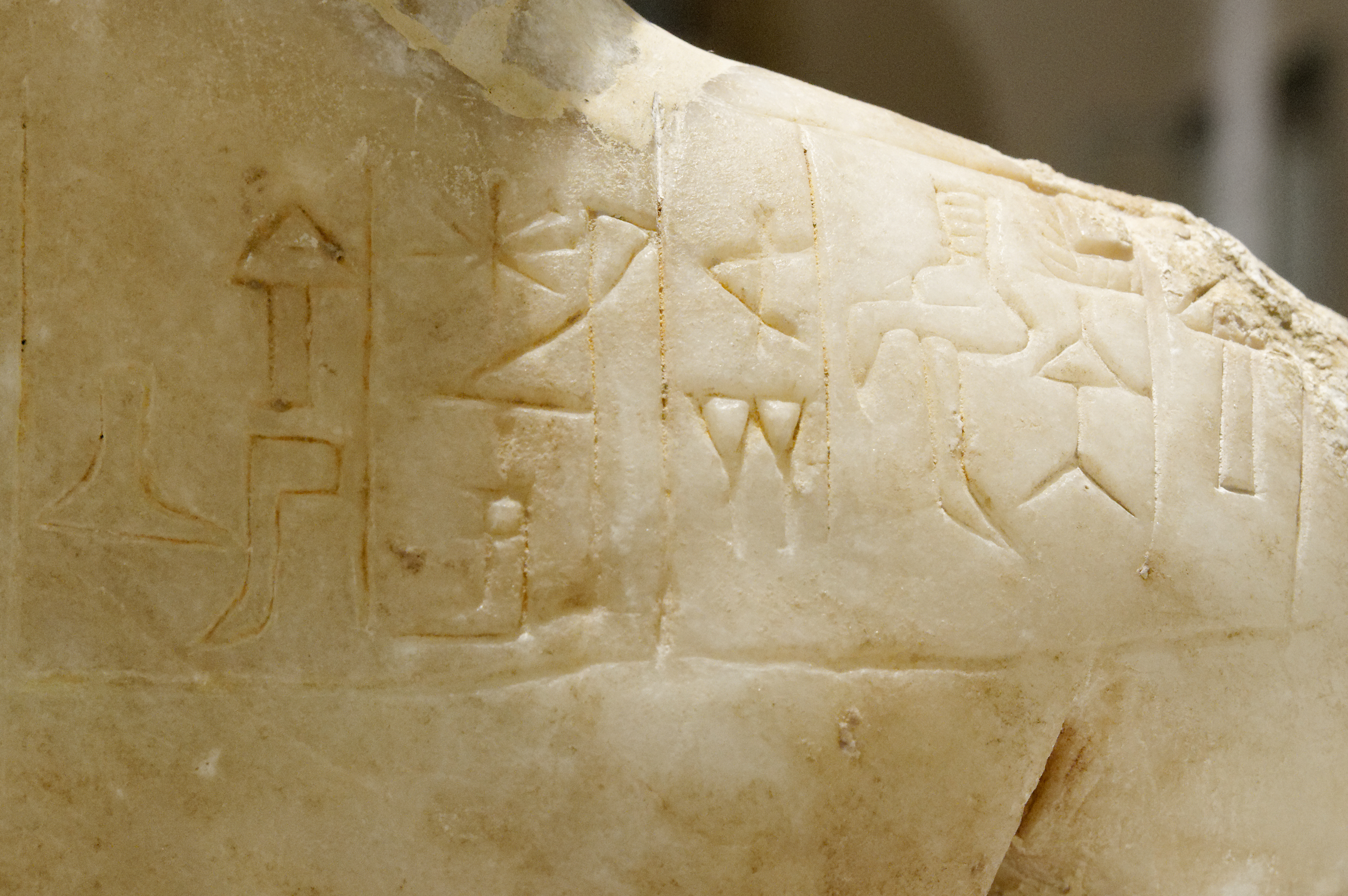
Dedication of the statue in Proto-cuneiform script: "Ebih-Il, nu-banda (𒉡𒌉, nu-banda, "overseer"), offered his statue to Ishtar Virile"

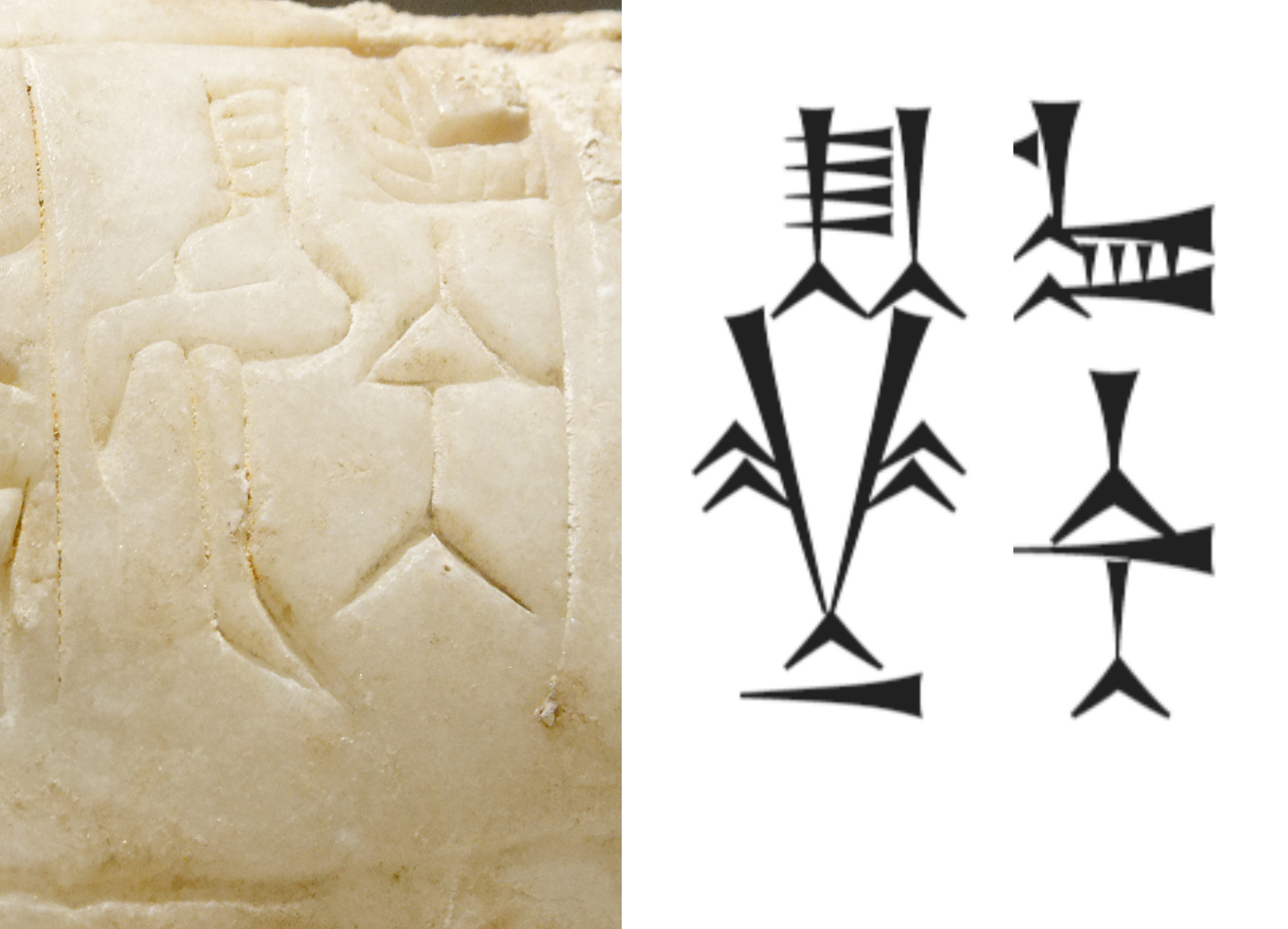
The name "Ebih-Il" (𒂗𒋾𒅋, EN-TI-IL) on the statue, with the corresponding standard Sumero-Akkadian cuneiforms.

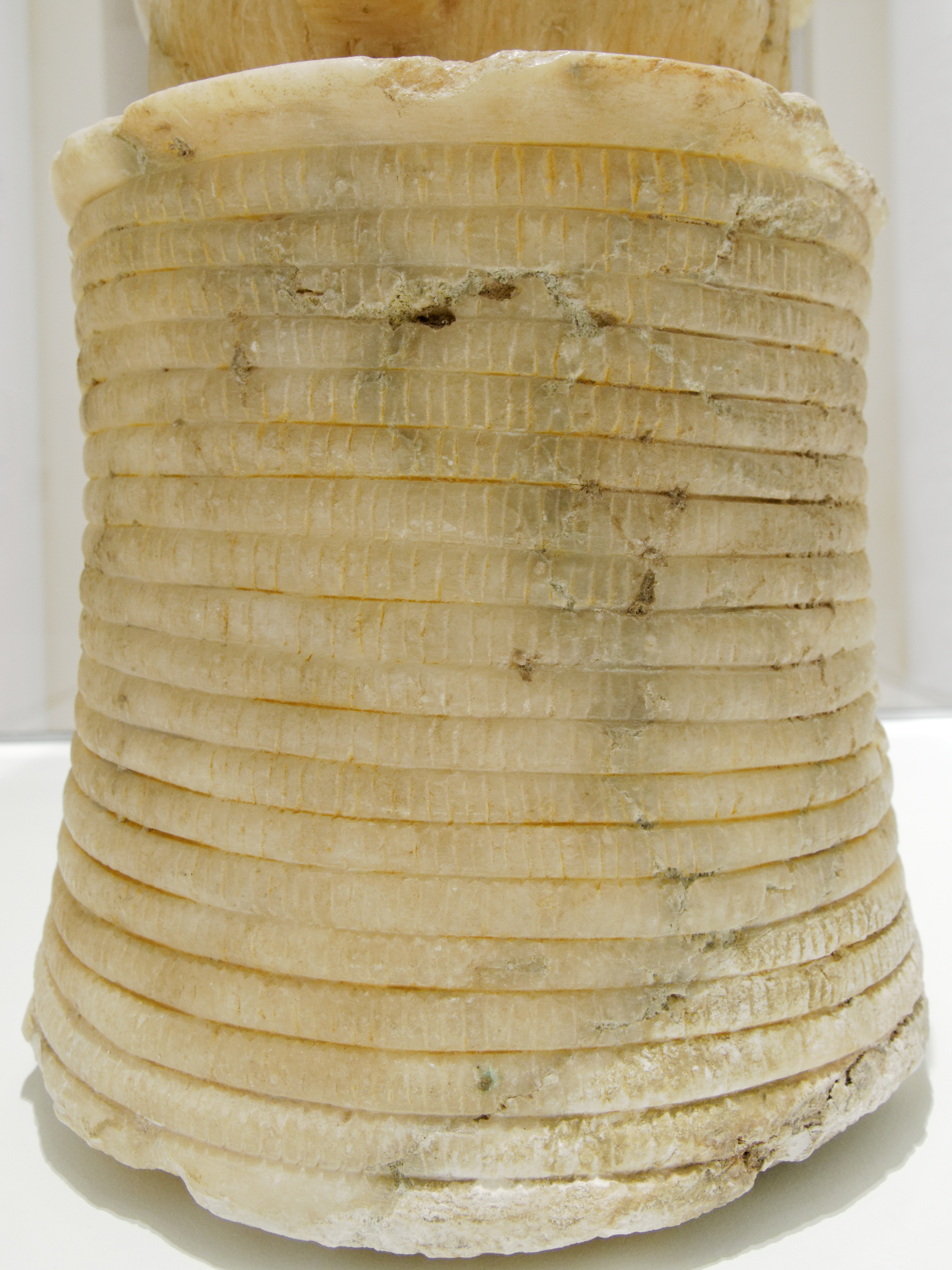
A closeup showing the details of the wicker seat

== See also ==
- Art of Mesopotamia
- Investiture of Zimrilim
- Statue of Iddi-Ilum

== Bibliography ==
- Cluzan, Sophie; Lecompte, Camille; Musée du Louvre. Département des antiquités orientales (2011). Ebih-Il (in French). Paris: Louvre éditions. ISBN 9782757205099.
- Parrot, André (1935). "Les fouilles de Mari (Première campagne)" (PDF). Syria (in French). 16 (1). Institut français du Proche-Orient: 1–28. doi:10.3406/syria.1935.8338.
