= Statue of Iddi-Ilum =

21st-century BC statue from Mari, Syria

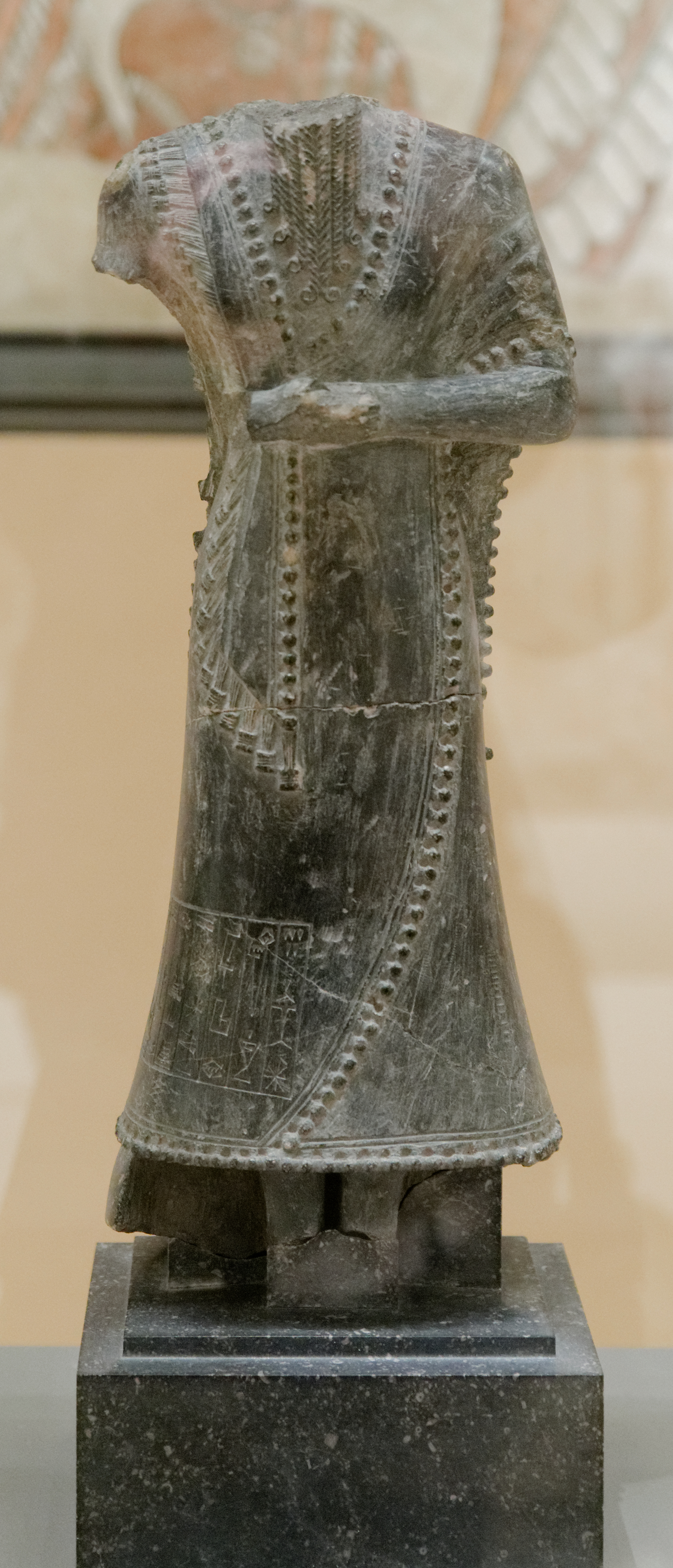
- Material: Soapstone
- Height: 41.5 centimetres (16.3 in)
- Created: c. 2090 BC
- Discovered: 1936
- Place: Royal Palace, Mari, Syria
- Present location: Musée du Louvre, Paris
- Identification: AO 19486

The Statue of Iddi-Ilum is a 21st-century BC statue of the praying figure of Iddi-ilum (𒄿𒋾𒀭, i-ti-ilum), the military governor, or Shakkanakku, of the ancient city-state of Mari in eastern Syria. The headless statue was discovered at the Royal Palace of Mari during excavations directed by French archaeologist André Parrot. The statue was made of soapstone and bears an inscription identifying the figure and dedicating it to the goddess Ishtar or Inanna. The statue is now displayed at the Musée du Louvre in Paris. He was contemporary of the Third Dynasty of Ur, and probably their vassal.

== Overview ==
The soapstone statue depicts a standing figure in a traditional prayer posture with hands clasped against the chest. The figure's head is lost, but his beard is still visible. The beard is sculpted in eight symmetrical braids that are curled at the end. The statue's right arm and elbow are also lost.

=== Inscription ===
The bottom of the robe bears a cuneiform inscription in Akkadian stating the name and position of the figure, and the deity the statue was dedicated to. The goddess has been interpreted as either Ishtar, or a Sumerian equivalent, Inanna. The inscription, engraved in ten columns, reads: "Iddi-Ilum, shakkanakku of Mari, has dedicated his statue to Inanna. Whosoever erases this inscription will have his line wiped out by Inanna."

== Excavation ==
The statue was found during the fourth excavation season at Mari (Winter 1936–1937) by the French excavation team under André Parrot. The two pieces of the statue were found in courtyard 148 of the royal palace.

== Gallery ==
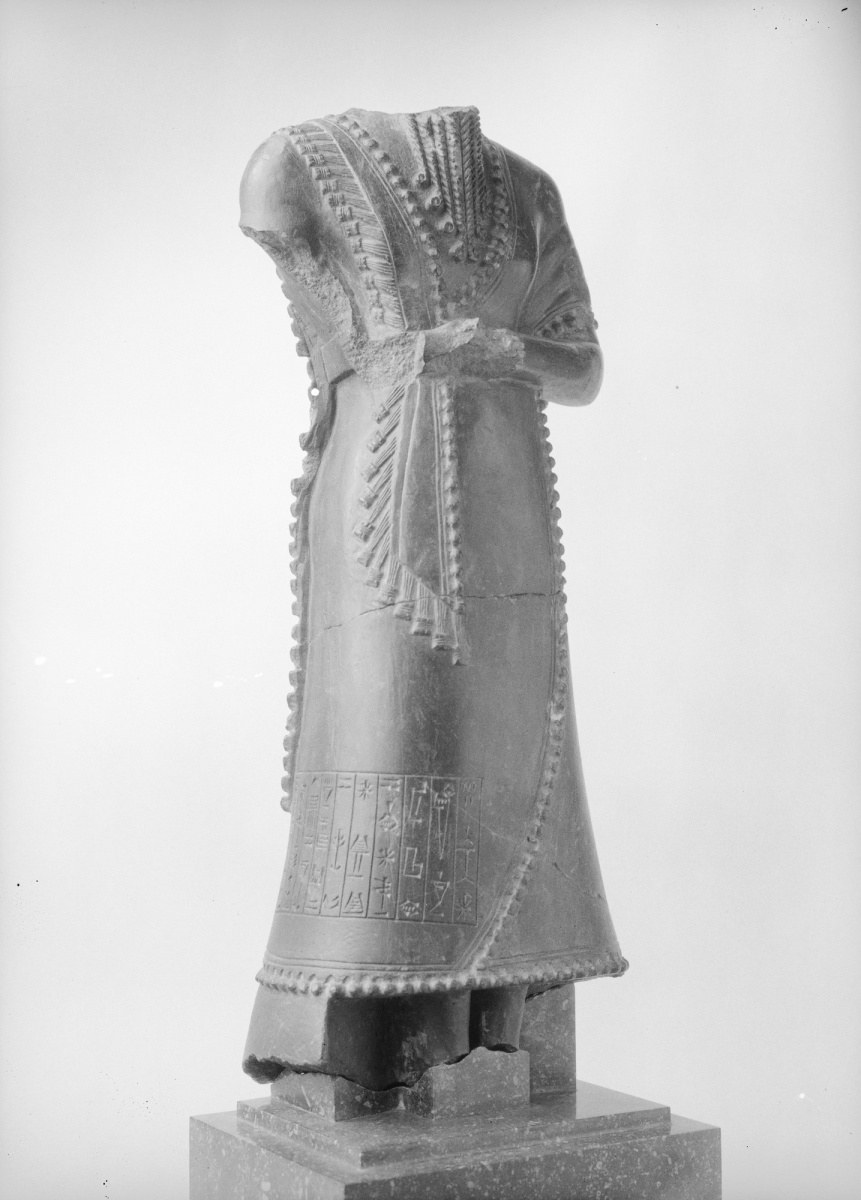
The statue in 1936, at time of discovery

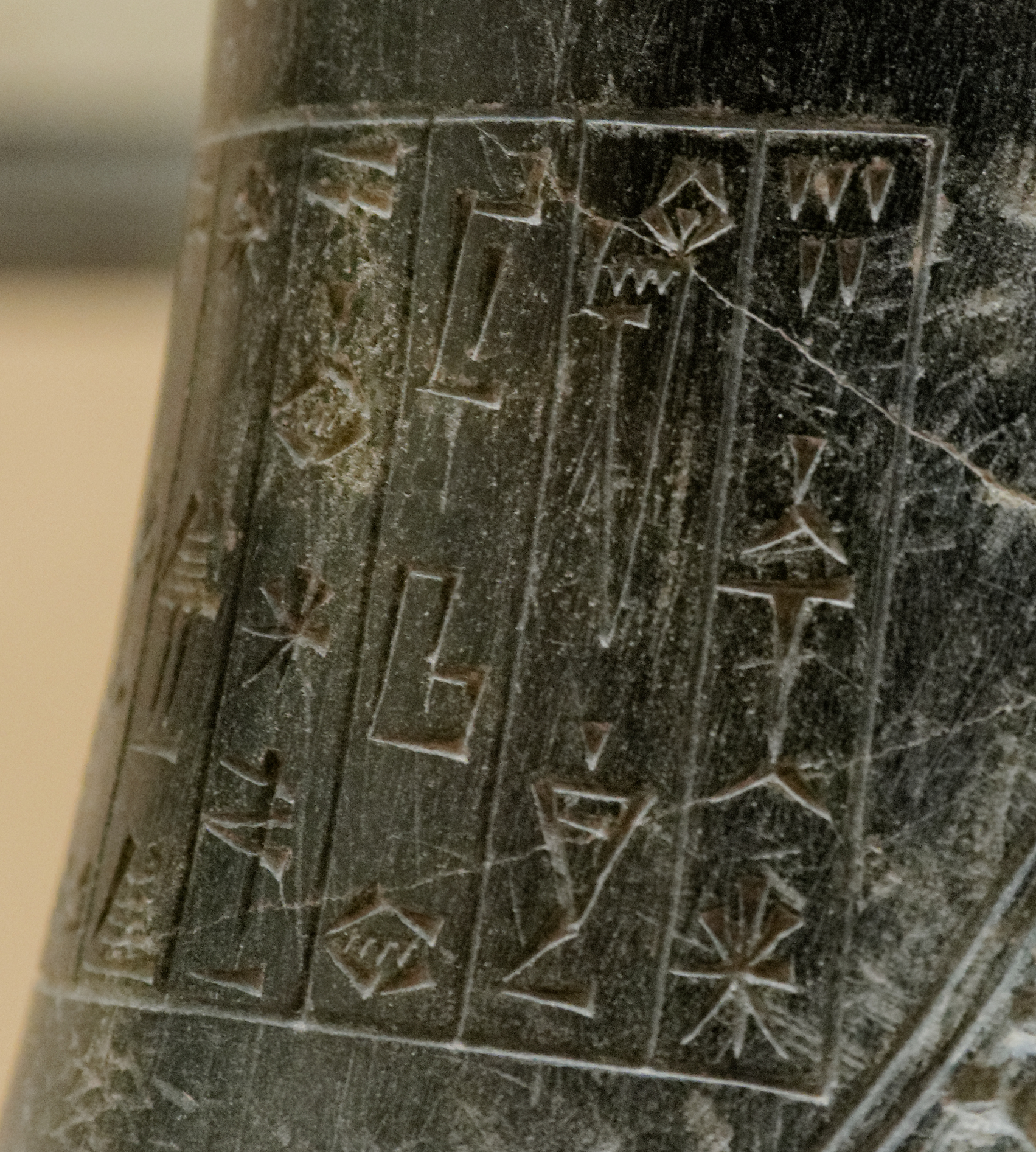
The inscription on the bottom of the statue (front)

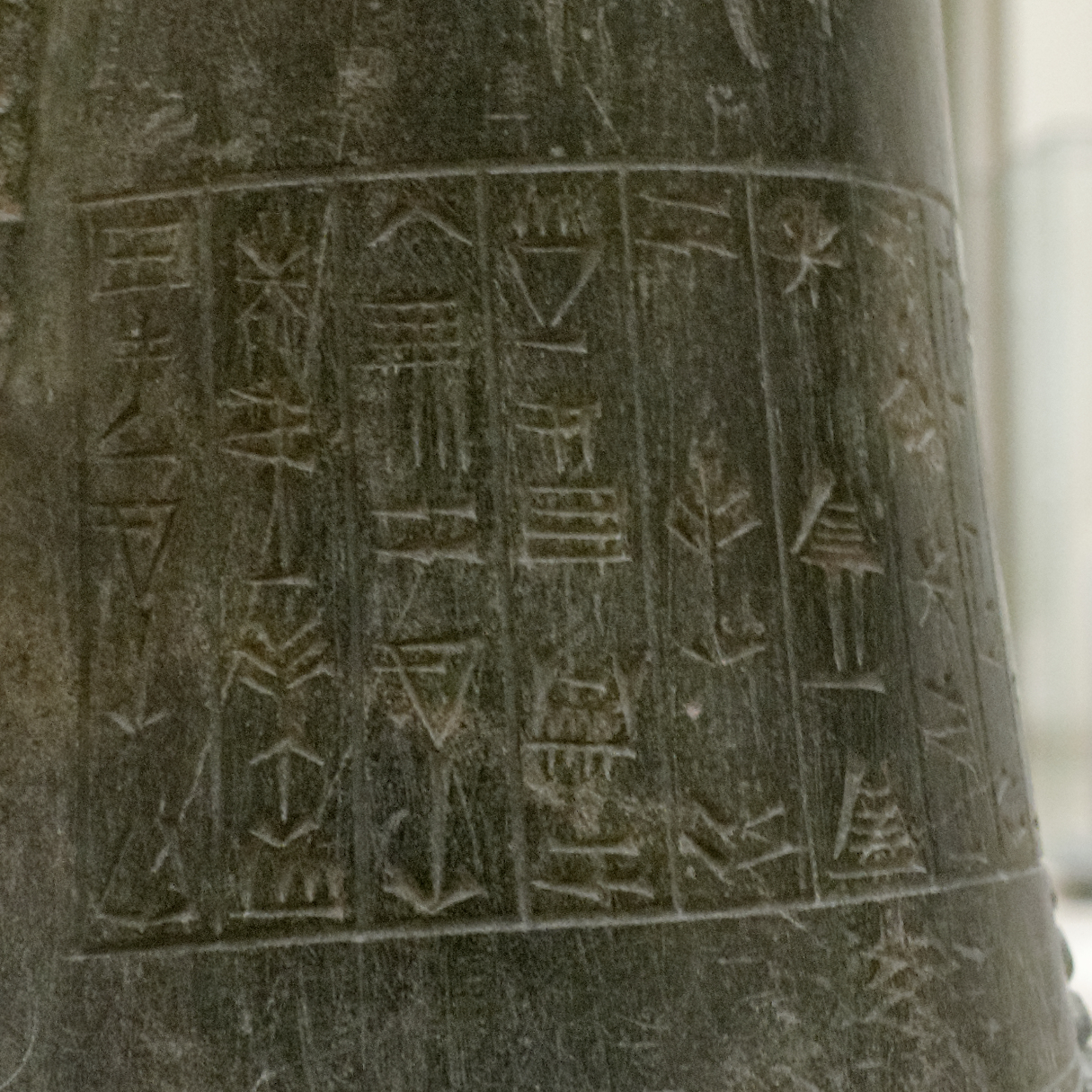
The inscription on the bottom of the statue (back)

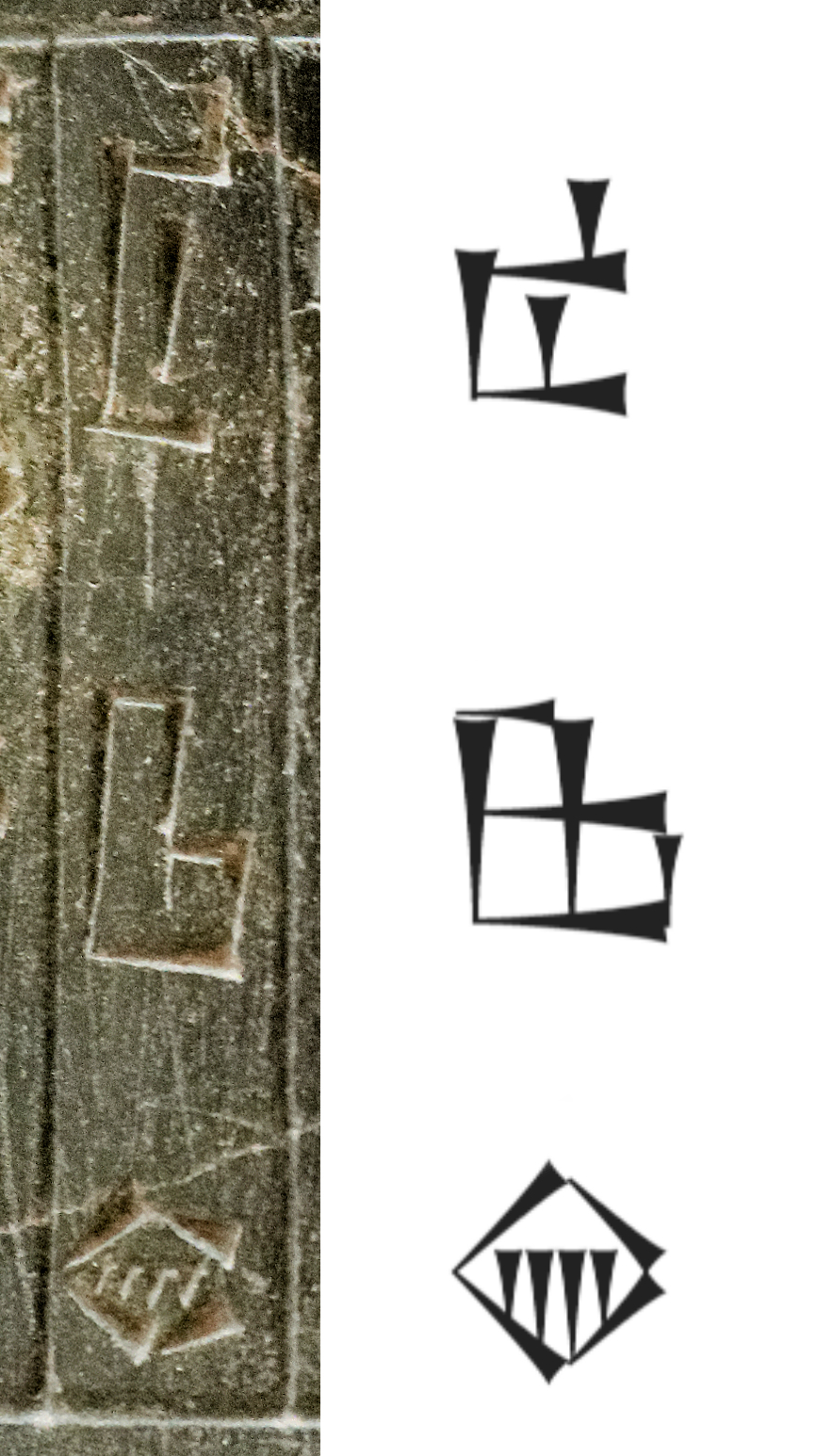
"Country of Mari" (Cuneiform: 𒈠𒌷𒆠, Mari-ki), on the statue of Iddi-Ilum

== See also ==
- Art of Mesopotamia
- Investiture of Zimrilim
- Statue of Ebih-Il
