= Investiture of Zimri-Lim =

C. 18th-century BC mural made in Syria

The Investiture of Zimri-Lim
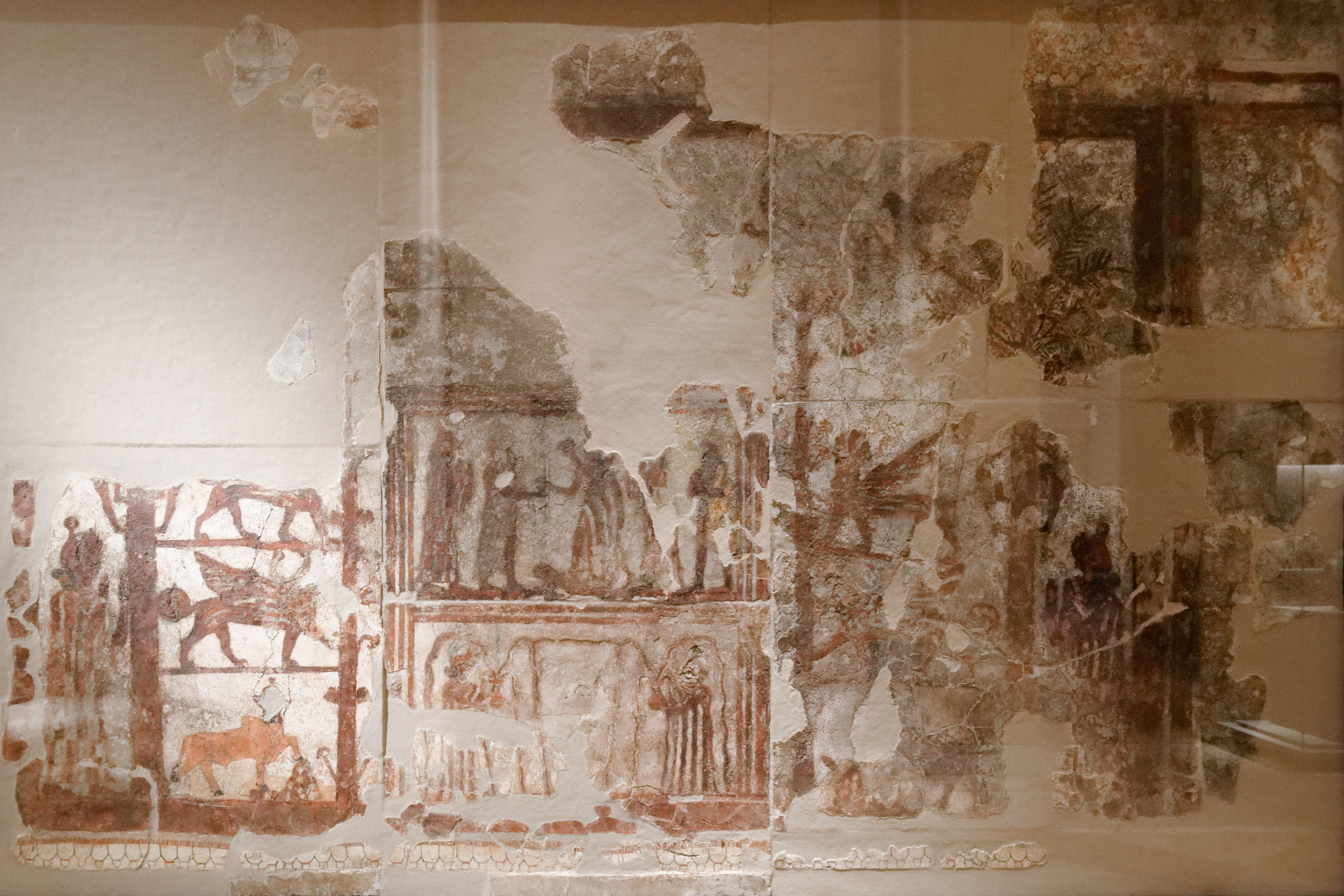
- Overview of the fresco
- Material: Mural painting on white plaster
- Size: 4.25 square metres (45.7 sq ft)
- Height: 1.7 metres (5 ft 7 in)
- Width: 2.5 metres (8 ft 2 in)
- Created: c. 18th century BC
- Period/culture: Amorite
- Discovered: 1935–1936
- Place: Royal palace of Mari, Syria
- Present location: Musée du Louvre, Paris
- Identification: AO 19826

The Investiture of Zimri-Lim is a large colorful mural discovered at the Royal Palace of the ancient city-state of Mari in eastern Syria. The fresco, which dates back to the 18th century BC, depicts Zimri-Lim, king of Mari, receiving the rod-and-ring symbol (a ring and a staff, symbols of rule) from the goddess Ishtar. It was discovered by French archaeologist André Parrot during excavations at Mari in 1935–1936. The painting is now displayed at the Musée du Louvre in Paris, France.

== Overview ==
The painting is composed of three vertical panels arranged symmetrically, with the two outer sections framing the central one. The middle panel is divided horizontally into two rectangular registers framed by six parallel lines of different colors. The painting's symmetry facilitates the reconstruction of the damaged part on the left panel.

The symbols and iconography of the mural are often compared to the figures atop the Stele of Hammurabi.

== Gallery ==
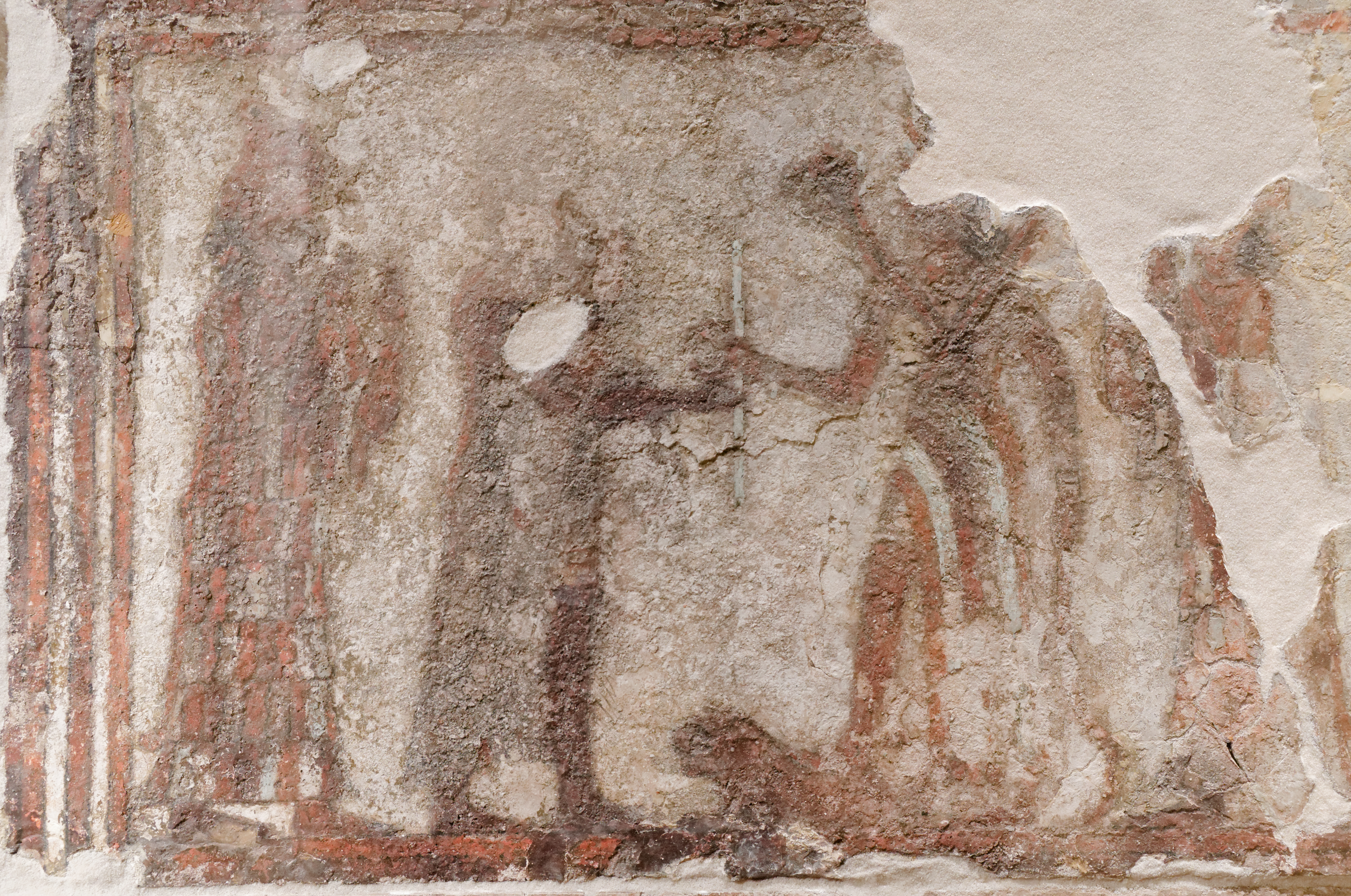
The central register depicting the scene of investiture.

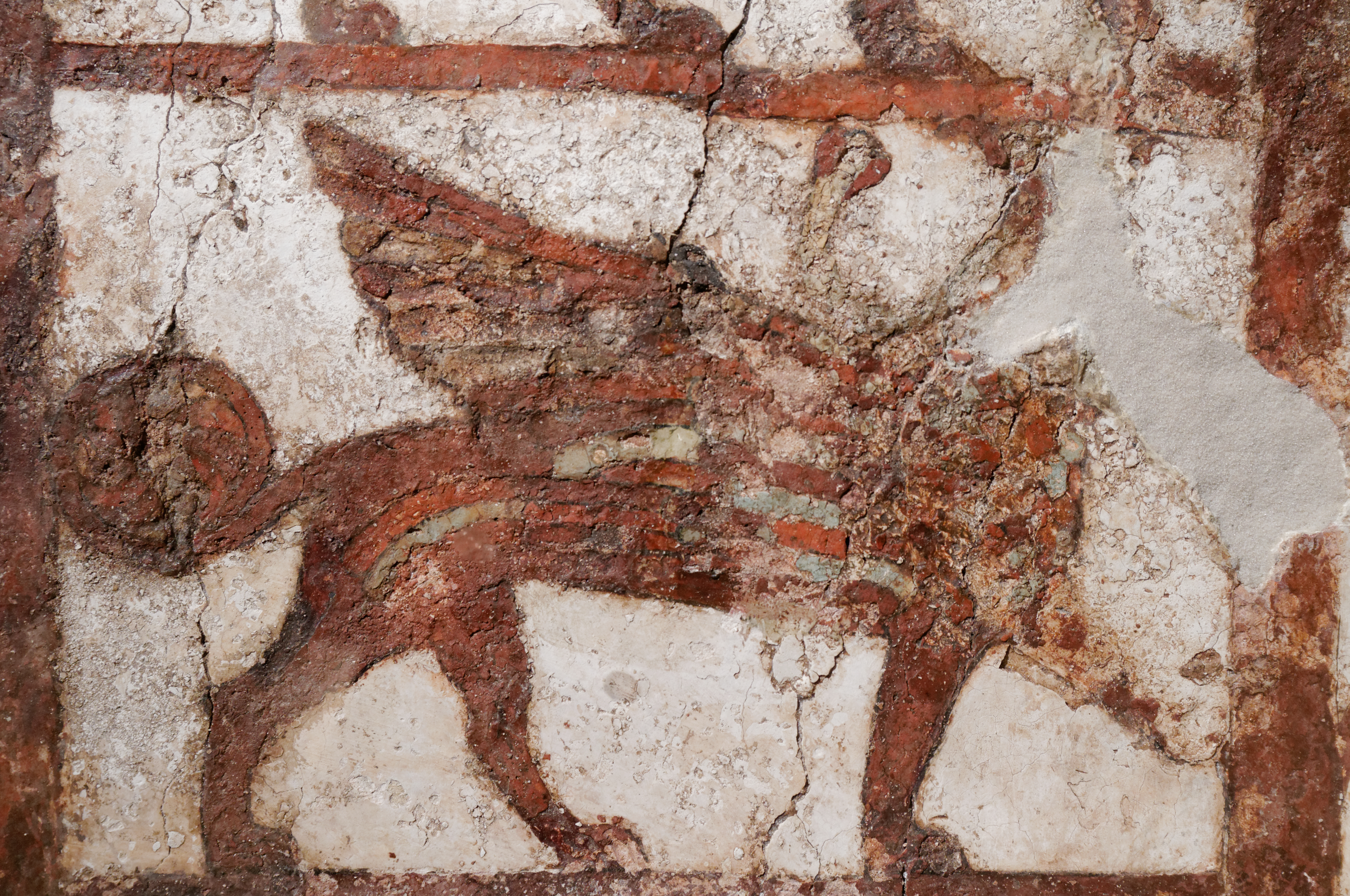
The winged lion symbolizes Ishtar's aggression.

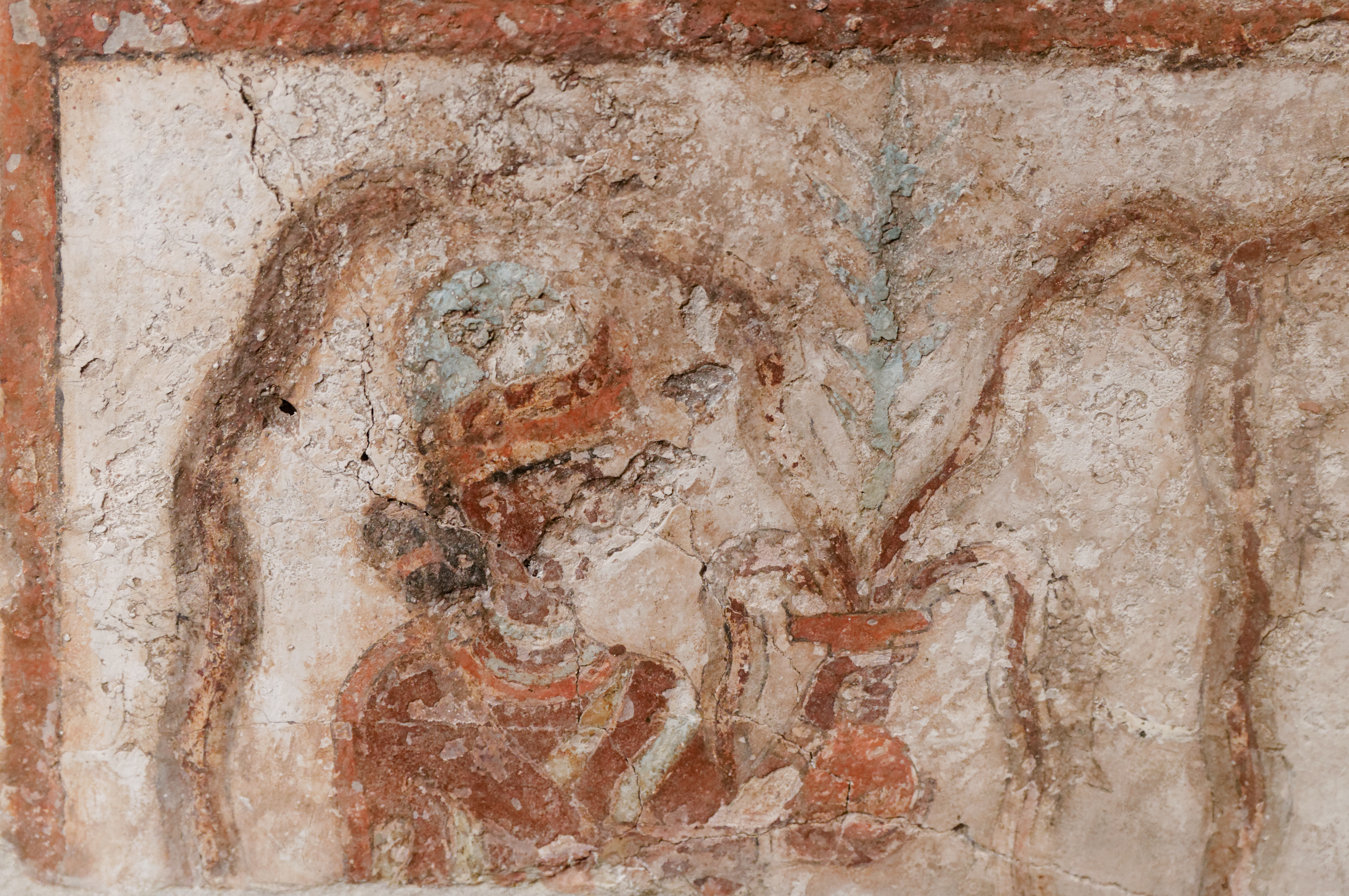
The Lama deity dispensing water from a round vase.

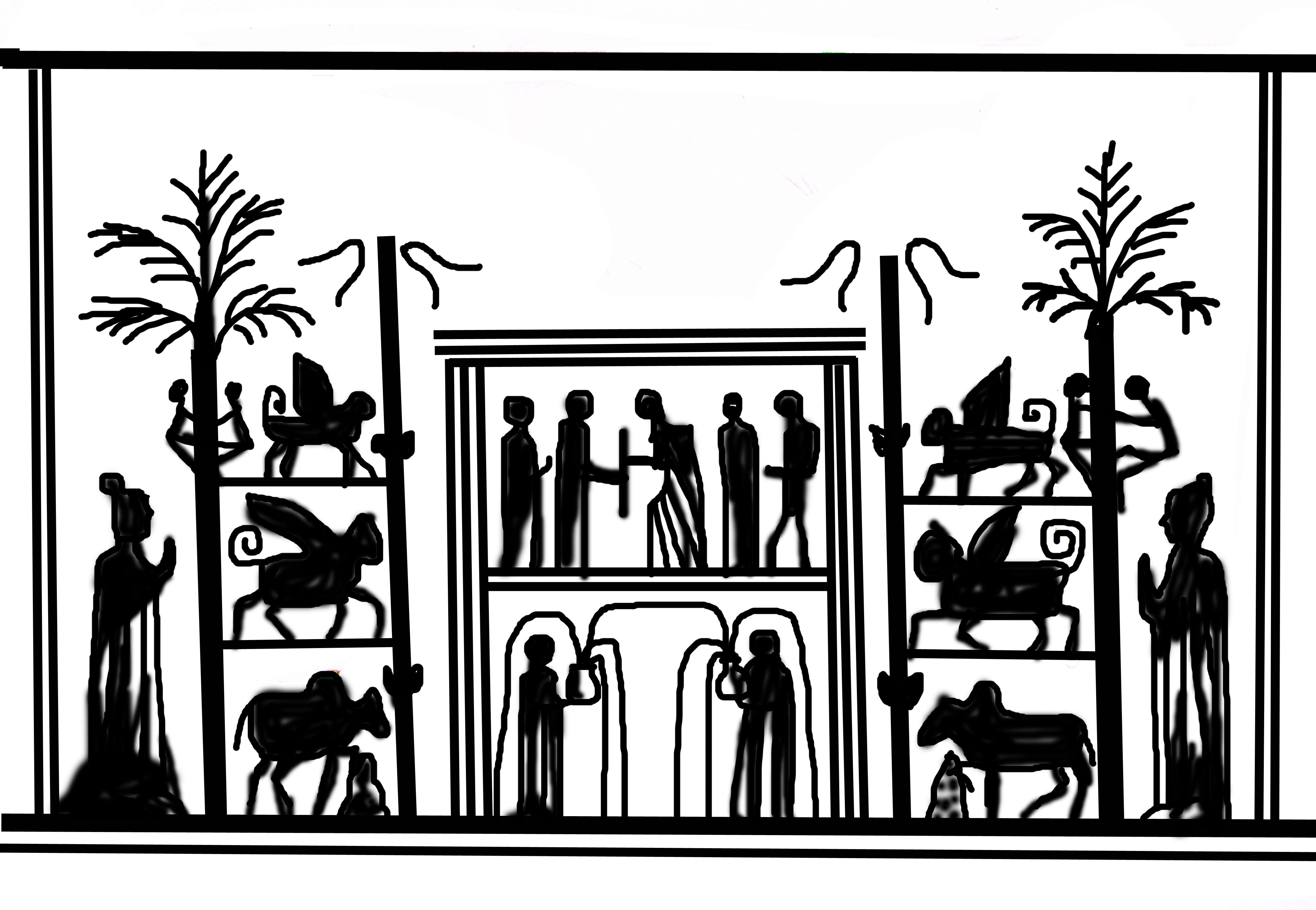
Diagram of the mural.

== See also ==
- Art of Mesopotamia
- Statue of Ebih-Il
- Statue of Iddi-Ilum
