= Royal Palace of Mari =

Royal palace of the kingdom of Mari in eastern Syria

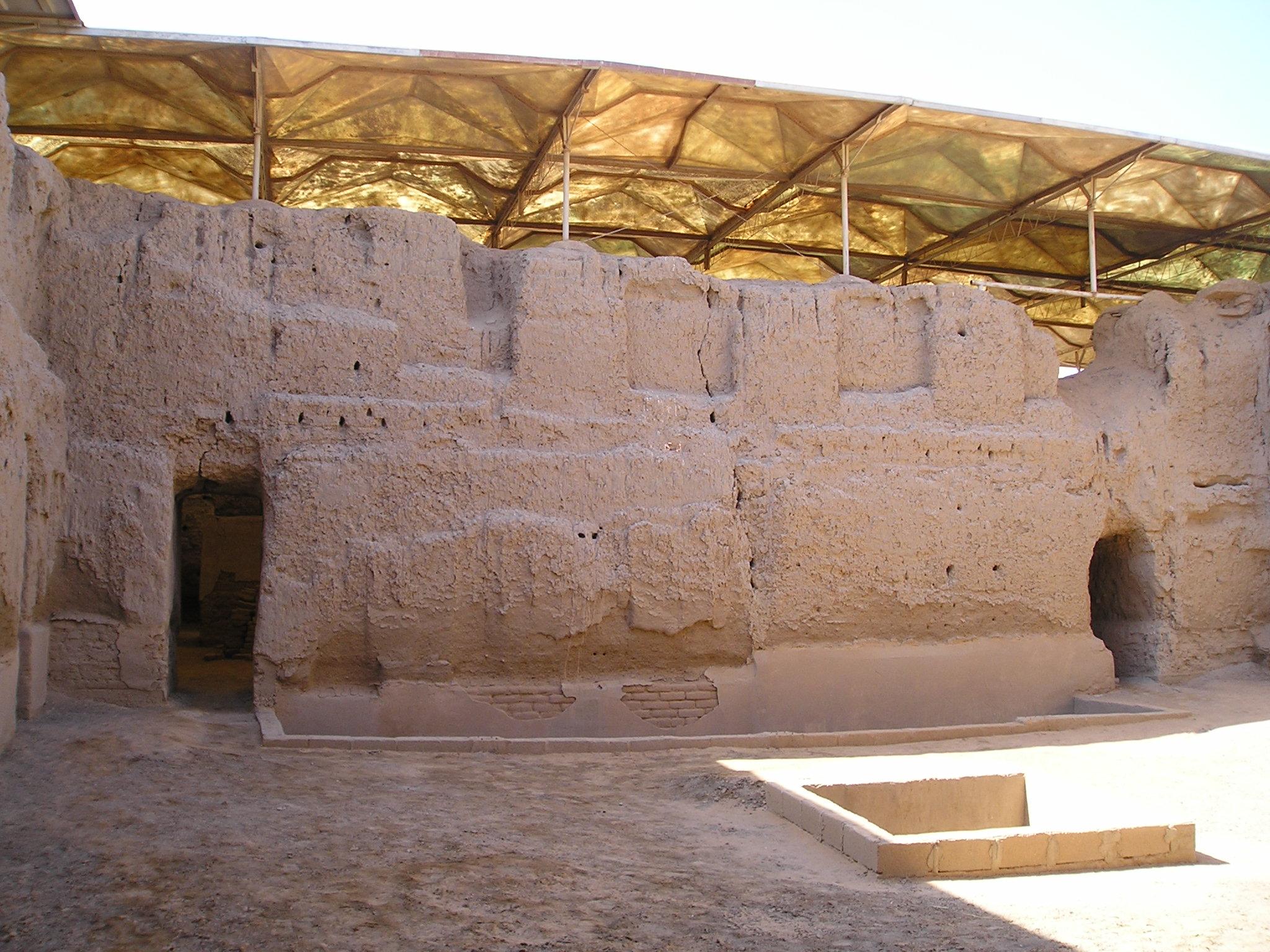
- The palace in 2005

- Location in Syria
- 34.551399°N 40.888473°E
- Type: House
- Periods: Bronze – Hellenistic
- Associated with: Yasmah-Adad, Zimrilim
- Location: Deir ez-Zor, Syria
- Part of: Acropolis

History
- Built: Construction started; c. 2450 BC; Completed; c. 1800 BC

Site notes
- Material: Stone
- Area: 2.5 hectares (6.2 acres)
- Condition: Partial restoration
- Public access: No

The Royal Palace of Mari was the royal residence of the rulers of the ancient kingdom of Mari in eastern Syria. Located between Canaan, Aram, Bashan, and Ebla to its west and Assyria, Akkad, Sumer, and Elam to its east, Mari acted as the “middle-man” to these powerful kingdoms. Both the size and grand nature of the palace demonstrate the importance of Mari during its long history, though the most intriguing feature of the palace is the nearly 25,000 tablets found within the palace rooms. The royal palace was discovered in 1935, excavated with the rest of the city throughout the 1930s, and is considered one of the most important finds made at Mari. André Parrot led the excavations and was responsible for the discovery of the city and the palace. Thousands of clay tablets were discovered through the efforts of André Bianquis, who provided archaeologists the tools to learn about, and to understand, everyday life at the palace in Mari. The discovery of the tablets also aided in the labeling of various rooms in terms of their purpose and function.

Much of the site was plundered by ISIS between 2013 and 2015.

== Overview ==
=== Historical phases ===
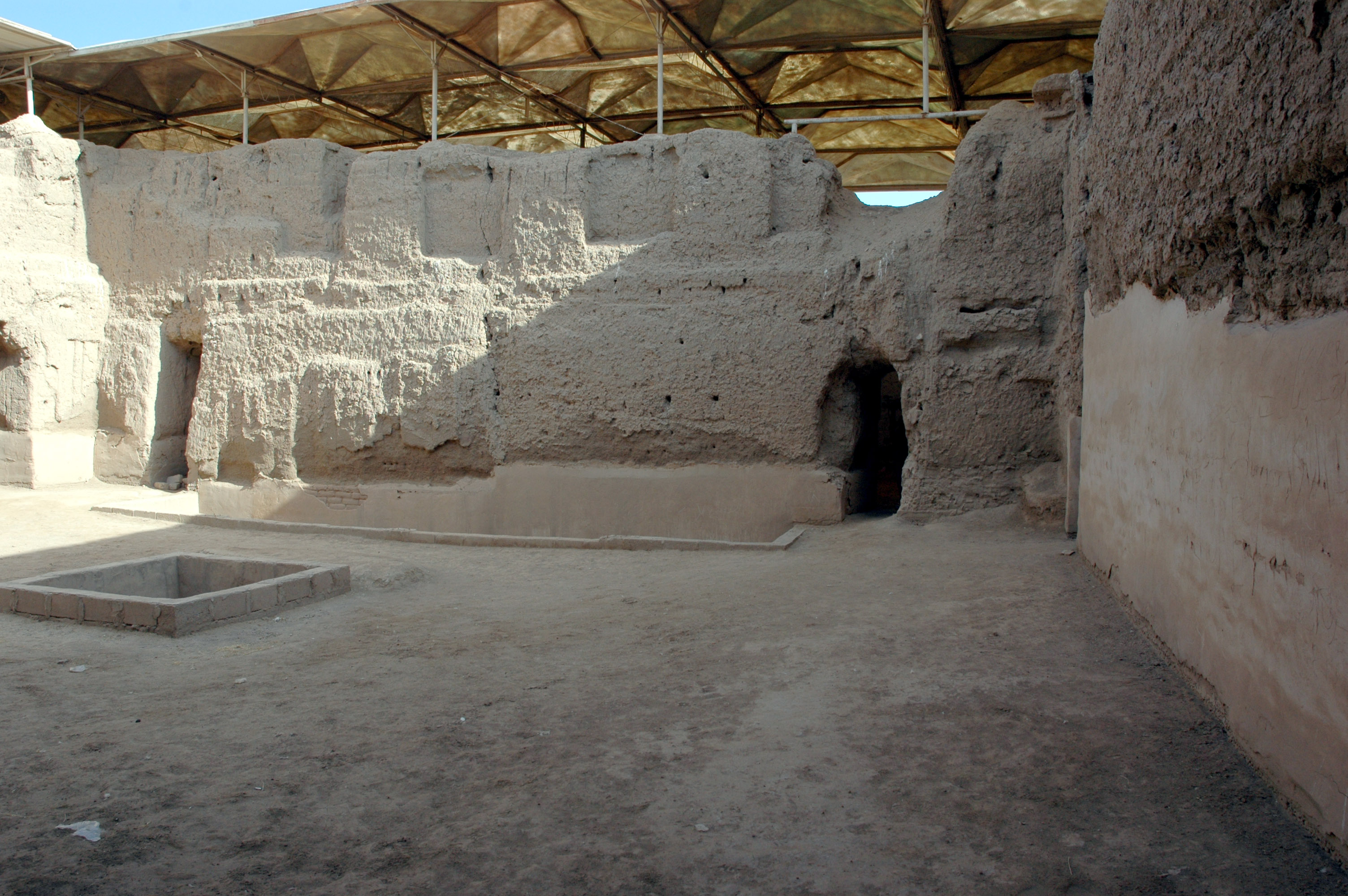
The ruins of the royal palace's "palm courtyard" (in 2004).

Before the construction of the royal palace, the site was occupied by a building known as the "Pre-Sargonic Palace," dating back to before 2300 BC (the "City II" period). Its exact nature is debated: it is traditionally considered the royal palace of this period, which is known from texts. But it does not exhibit the characteristics of a palace: it contains neither a throne room nor luxurious apartments, but rather a sanctuary, the so-called "Sacred Enclosure" (Enceinte Sacrée) and workshops. It could therefore be more accurately described as a kind of "temple-manufacture," with the workshops serving the needs of worship. The palatial sector may nevertheless have been located nearby, in an unexcavated area.

The presence of the later palace and its excavation limited the possibilities of uncovering the deeper layers from the City II period, particularly for the earlier phases. Four periods of occupation, designated P3 to P0, have been identified:

- P3, the oldest level, is identified in only a few locations, in the middle of the Sacred Enclosure and at a gateway;
- P2 yielded the complete plan of the Sacred Enclosure, a religious sector organized around a central space 16 meters long surrounded by several rooms;
- P1 is known for the eastern part of the building and has revealed domestic and workshop areas; it ended in a fire during the capture of the city at the end of the period;
- P0 directly follows the destruction: earthworks are carried out, the area of the Sacred Enclosure is restored, a monumental room is built, perhaps serving as a throne room; this level is occupied for only a short time.

The palace is rebuilt at the very beginning of the period of the rulers known as Šakkanakku, in the 22nd century BC (beginning of the "City III" period). Virtually nothing remains of the levels of the first part of this structure (J.-C. Margueron refers to it as a "phantom palace"). It disappeared during a reconstruction that took place in the 21st century B.C. (due to King Hanun-Dagan?), which was built at a lower level, and destroyed its foundations. This palace, having been occupied by the rulers of Mari until the destruction of the city, is best known for its last phae, that of the first half of the 18th century B.C. It seems, however, that its layout was not substantially modified in the meantime, so it is possible to reconstruct the size and main units of the Šakkanakku period. It was a little smaller than the final state since additions were made to the south and east. It included a chapel which occupies part of the old Sacred Enclosure, the building thus retaining its religious character which makes it original among the palaces of the period. A large courtyard stood in the western sector (the future "Court of the Palm"), and gave access to the throne room to the south (whose location also remained stable).

=== Layout under Zimri-Lim ===
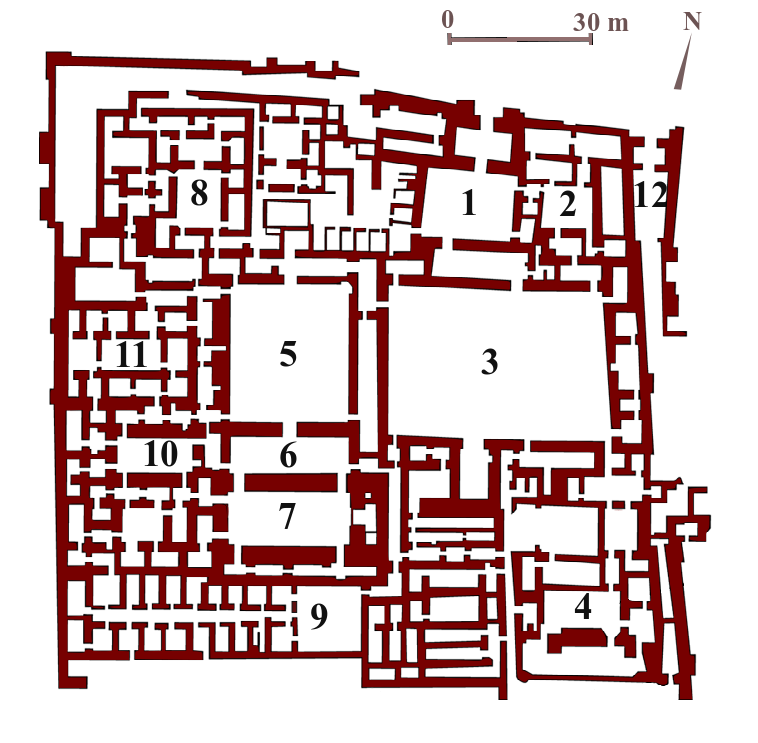
Plan of the royal palace during the reign of Zimri-Lim. 1. Entrance courtyard 2. Steward's quarters (bīt tertim) 3. Court of the Painted Chapel 4. Temple of the "Lady of the Palace" (Bēlet ekallim) 5. Court of the Palms 6. Vestibule (papahum) 7. Throne room 8. Harem, Women's House 9. Servants' quarters 10. Kitchens 11. Administrative area of the Women's House 12. Nergal Gate.

The last king of Mari, Zimri-Lim (c. 1775-1761 BCE), took up residence in the palace without altering its layout. This is the final and best-documented state of the building. The general organization of the palace was identified through the combined analysis of material remains and texts, which made it possible to identify and often rediscover the names of its main sectors, even if some differences in interpretation remain.

- The main entrance (the "Palace Gate") was located in the northeast and led to rooms dedicated to administration (bīt tertim), supervised by the palace steward; another room located further east, the "Nergal Gate," seems to have served primarily as a passage for vehicles and goods stored in the palace storerooms, as well as for access to the temple of the Lady of the Palace (it owes its name to a Nergal chariot ritual mentioned in tablets);
- The main courtyard in the eastern section is the large "Court of the Painted Chapel" (archaeologists' court 131), who had a central cistern, named so because it opens on its south side onto the small "Painted Chapel" (or Building; bīt birmī), dedicated to the goddess Ishtar (room 131);
- To the west is the entrance to the "Court of the Palms" (court 106), so named because a palm tree once stood in its center. This courtyard lies at the heart of the "official" sector (royal archives have been found in several rooms bordering it, notably 108, 110, and 115); its walls were covered with mural paintings depicting the Investiture of the King and sacrificial processions.
- On its south side is a vestibule (papahum, room 64), which housed the statue of the goddess with the flowing vase (probably Ishtar), followed by the throne room (room 65), 12 x 25 m and 12 m high, with a dais/podium to the west for the throne and a tribune to the east where stood statues of ancient kings of Mari (for the dynastic cult?).
- To the west of the palm courtyard is the bit mayyalim ("house/building of the bed"), which may correspond to the former royal apartments, converted into storage and reception rooms during the reign of Zimri-Lim.
- Zimri-Lim's livings quarters were likely located on the first floor, in the southern part of the courtyard of the painted building; they collapsed when the palace was destroyed, but remnants of paintings that fell on the ground floor indicate the presence of luxurious rooms. The adjacent rooms in the south/southwest part of the ground floor were probably used for the king's daily needs (kitchens, storerooms, servants' quarters);
- The "harem" or "House of Women," where the palace women resided, was located in the northwest part of the building, also including utilitarian and administrative spaces, as well as areas for the servants.
- To the southeast stood a temple dedicated to the "Lady of the Palace" (Bēlet ekallim), on a very ancient sacred site, which had a separate entrance on the western side of the building; this combination of a temple and a palace is a distinctive feature of the structure.
- The part located completely to the southeast of the building is another administrative area including shops.

=== Destruction ===
Mari was conquered and seized by the Babylonian armies of King Hammurabi in 1761 BC. The city was occupied for several months and ultimately systematically destroyed in 1759 BC, along with its palace. Archaeology clearly documents these stages in the palace: the building was emptied of most of its contents, its archives were sorted, and anything of interest to the Babylonian authorities was taken away as booty. Then, at the end of the occupation, it was burned and demolished (the upper floor collapsed onto the ground floor). It was never occupied again.

== Artistic and archaeological finds ==
=== Statues ===
Statues of gods and past rulers were the most common among statues unearthed at the Palace of Zimri-Lin. The title of Shakkanakku (military governor) was borne by all the princes of a dynasty who reigned at Mari in the late third millennium and early second millennium BC. These kings were the descendants of the military governors appointed by the kings of Akkad. Statues and sculpture were used to decorate the exterior and interior of the palace. Zimri-Lin used these statues to connect his kingship to the gods and to the traditions of past rulers. Most notable of these statues are the statue of Iddi-Ilum, Ishtup-Ilum, the Statue of the Water Goddess, and Puzur-Ishtar.

==== Puzur-Ishtar ====
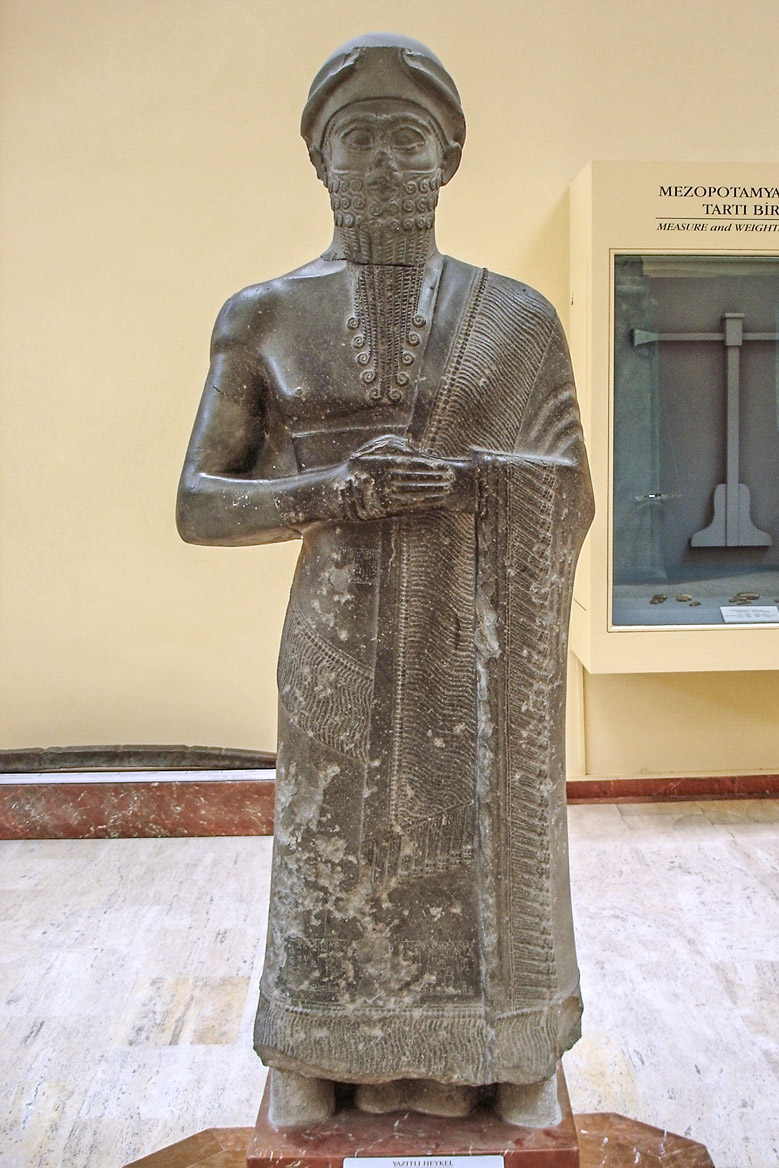
The Statue of Puzur-Ishtar, Governor of Mari

The statue of Puzur-Ishtar once stood in one of the sanctuaries of the Palace of Zimri-Lim, but was discovered in the museum of Nebuchadrezzar’s palace at Babylon. The inscription on the hem of the statue’s skirt mentions Puzur-Ishtar, sakkanakku of Mari, and also mentions his brother the priest Milaga. Horned caps are usually limited to divine representations in Mesopotamian art but they do not occur on depictions of kings during the Ur III period, therefore it is considered that perhaps the horns of divinity on Puzur-Ishtar’s cap qualified him (to the Babylonian soldiers) as a god to be carted home as the ultimate symbol of their victory over the people of Mari.

==== Ishtup-Ilum ====
The Statue of Ishtup-Ilum is made of basalt and was found in room 65 of the palace. The inscription on his shoulder identifies this man as a governor (sakkanakku) of Mari during the early second millennium BC Ishtup-Ilum was known for his lavish gifts to the Ishtar temple, the temple of the popular goddess of fertility, love, war, and sex. The height of the statue is 1.52 meters. The statue is now in the Aleppo Museum.

==== Iddi-Ilum ====
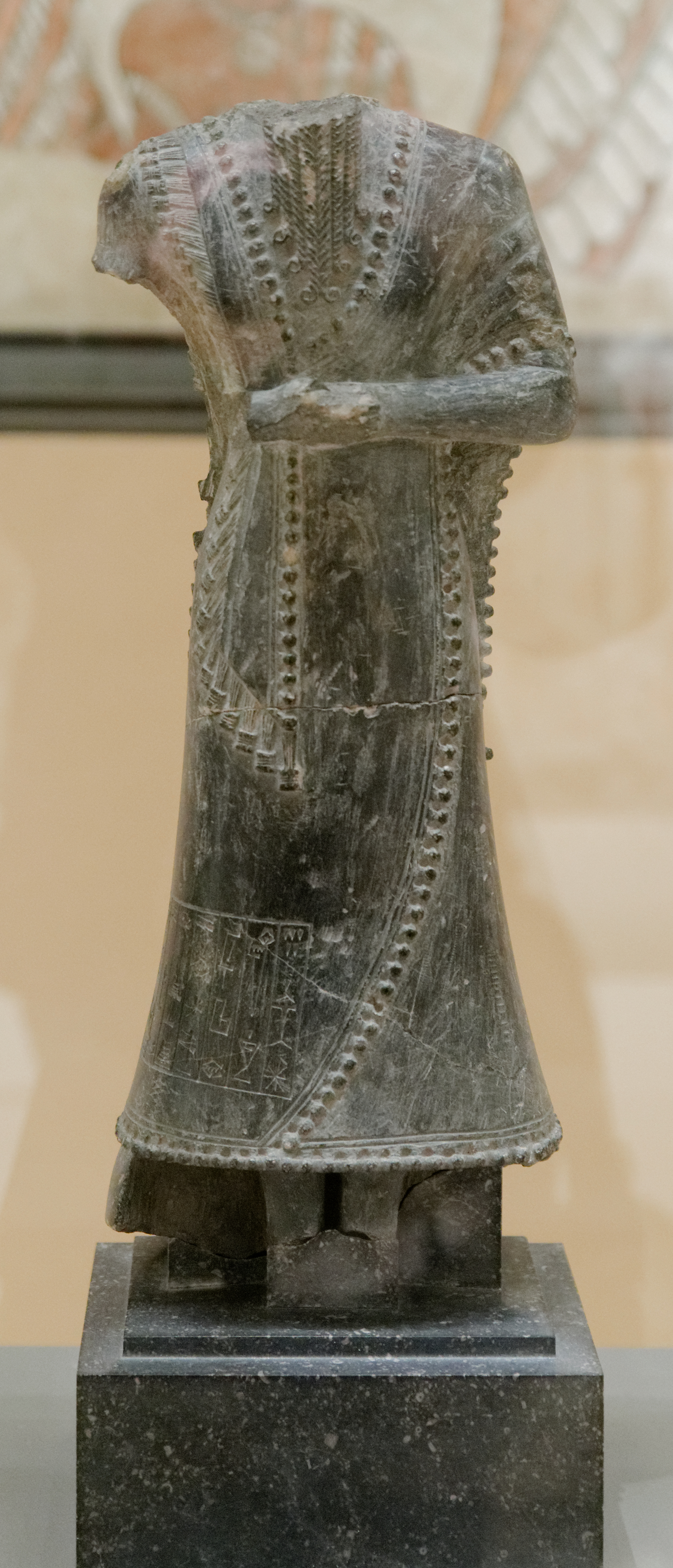
The Statue of Iddi-Ilum

Iddi-Ilum was a former sakkanakku of Mari. This statue portrays Iddi-Ilum as a religious ruler, for his hands are clasped in front of him in the typical Mesopotamian pose of prayer. His luxurious robe has a tasseled border and is wound around his body, contrary to Mesopotamian tradition. The statuette bears an inscription in Akkadian: “Iddi-Ilum, shakkanakku of Mari, has dedicated his statue to Inanna. Whosoever erases this inscription will have his line wiped out by Inanna.” Connections can be made between this statuette and the statue of Puzur-Ishtar, also shakkanakku of Mari, by virtue of the trimmed beard and rich garments.

==== Statue of a Water Goddess ====
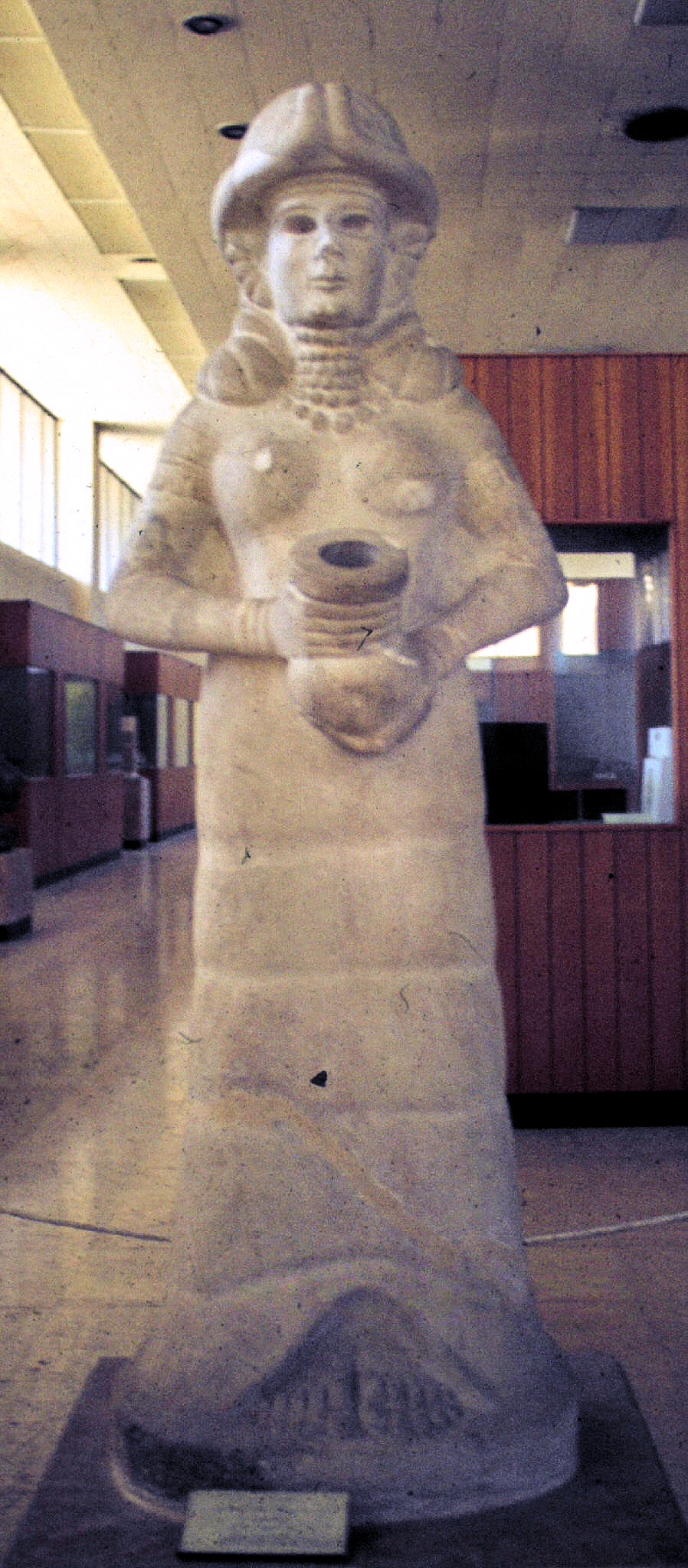
Statue of a Water Goddess. Was originally a fountain, with water flowing out of the vase.

Depictions of water bearing goddesses were a common occurrence in Mesopotamia. The statue of a Goddess holding a vase was in fact a fountain, with water flowing out of the vase. This statue is nearly life size and most likely stood in the palace chapel. A channel connected to a water supply was drilled through the body of the statue and allowed water to flow from the goddess’ vase.

=== Tablets ===
More than 20,000 tablets have been found in the palace. The tablets, according to André Parrot, "brought about a complete revision of the historical dating of the ancient Near East and provided more than 500 new place names, enough to redraw or even draw up the geographical map of the ancient world"

Many of the recovered tablets have been identified as either the remains of the royal epistolary archive of Mari, other administrative documents, and the King's letters to his wives which were found in the women's quarters. Some letters include direct quotes from King Hammurabi leading us to believe that they were contemporaneous with his rule.

Other letters shed light on divinity at Mari and in the ancient Near East. Letters from the epistolary archive include fascinating information about divination, gods, and even descriptions of ancient dreams. According to the tablets, a prophetic dream was had, a letter would be sent to a diviner who would perform extispicy to confirm the revelation.

=== Frescoes ===
The royal palace at Mari was decorated with frescoes and statues. Decorations were different depending on the function of the room. Religious and royal scenes were placed in public areas, where the message of kingship and religion could easily be viewed by visitors and residents of the palace. More private rooms, like the royal apartments, were decorated with patterns, shapes, and geometric designs. Designs in the royal apartments would have added to the luxurious accommodations befitting the royal family, while the representational frescoes would have demonstrated luxury, power, and authority.

Figural frescoes were found in five rooms within the Palace of Mari. From those recovered, only four compositions were able to be restored, due to the deterioration of the materials and damage done by Hammurabi of Babylon's sacking of Mari around 1760 BC.

==== The Investiture of the King ====
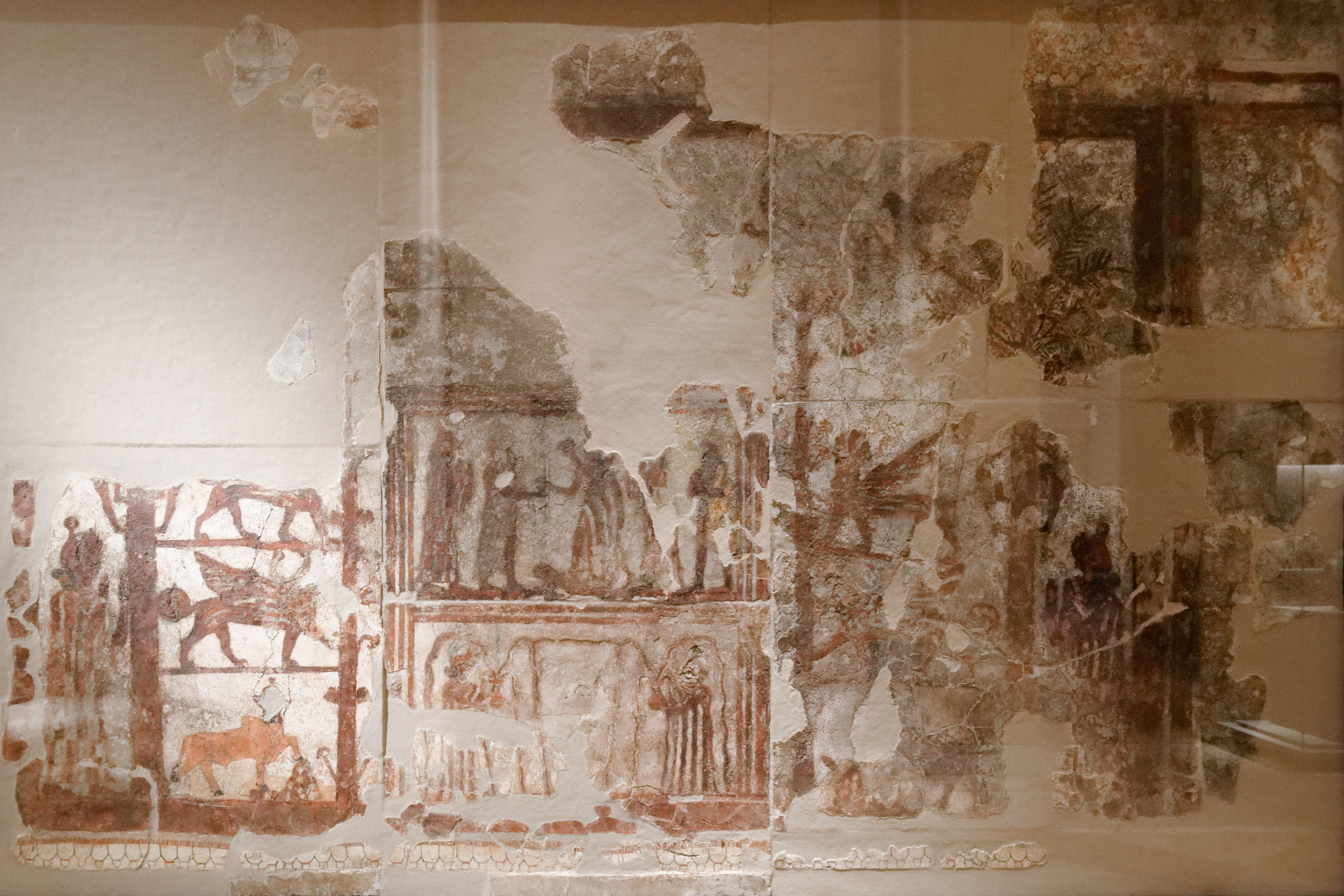
The Investiture of Zimri-lim

"The Investiture of Zimri-Lim," dating to the 18th century BC and discovered during 1935–1936 excavations at Mari by French archaeologist André Parrot, was the only painting found in situ in the palace. The painting is distinguished in part by its wide range of color, including green and blue. Painted on a thin layer of mud plaster applied directly to the palace's brick wall, the scene features a warrior goddess, likely Ishtar, giving Zimri-Lim a ring and a staff, the symbols of kingship. The continuation of the red and blue painted border of the panel suggests that it was one of several adorning the walls of the room.

Recent restoration efforts by the Louvre have revealed previously unseen details, such as scalloping on Zimri-Lim's robe, and unexpectedly vibrant colors, such as a brilliantly orange bull.

==== Sacrificial procession scene ====
Fragments of a sacrificial procession scene were found at the base of the eastern half of the same wall on which "The Investiture of Zimri-Lim" was recovered. The painting has multiple registers and depicts a life-size figure leading men who are in turn leading a procession of sacrificial animals. The colors utilized are black, brown, red, white, and gray.

The application technique of this scene differs from the thin mud plaster used as a base for other frescoes in the palace. The sacrificial procession scene utilized layered mud, which was scored to aid attachment to a top layer of thick gypsum plaster. The presence of both frescoes in the same room and the better preservation of the "Investiture" scene could mean that "Investiture" was an earlier painting, and that the concealing of this fresco by the later procession scene is what saved it from suffering the same degree of damage as the palace's other frescoes.

==== "Audience chamber" frescoes ====
A number of wall-painting fragments were also discovered in from the south-western end of narrow room that Parrot dubbed the "king's audience chamber." These fragments were restored to a size of 2.8 meters (nearly ten feet) in height and 3.35 meters (nearly eleven feet) in width.

The paintings include two major registers, each depicting a scene in which offerings are made to deities. The scenes are framed by mythological creatures and bordered top and bottom by striding men carrying bundles on their backs. The figures are outlined with thick black line, with red, gray, brown, yellow, and white pigments utilized throughout the painting.

==== Other fragmentary images ====
Painting fragments found in the same room as the "Investiture of Zimri-Lim" and the sacrificial procession scene include goats in heraldic pose flanking a tree, a life-size figure with a dagger in his belt, a figure in front of an architectural background, and a hand grasping hair in a manner very similar to the traditional Egyptian scene of a king smiting an enemy with a mace.

Others rooms yielded very fragmentary wall paintings, which may have fallen and broken partly as a result of the collapse of an upper story. The fragments fall into two general stylistic groups: figures resembling the bundle-bearing men in the "audience chamber" frescoes, and life-size figures bearing similarity to the sacrificial procession scene.

== Sources ==
- Burney, Charles (1977). The Ancient Near East. Cornell University Press. ISBN 978-0801410802.
- Gates, Henriette (1984). "The Palace of Zimri-Lim at Mari". The Biblical Archaeologist. 47 (2): 70–87. doi:10.2307/3209888. JSTOR 3209888. S2CID 165557297.
- Kuhrt, Amélie (1997). Ancient Near East C. 3000–330 BC. Routledge. ISBN 978-0-415-16763-5.
- Malamat, Abraham (1989). Mari and the Early Israelite Experience. Oxford University Press. ISBN 978-0197261170.
- Margueron, Jean-Claude (2004). Mari : métropole de l'Euphrate au IIIe et au début du IIe millénaire av. J.-C (in French). Paris: Picard.
- Margueron, Jean-Claude (2013). "The Kingdom of Mari". In Crawford, Harriet (ed.). The Sumerian World. Translated by Crawford, Harriet. pp. 517–537.
- Margueron, Jean-Claude (2014). Mari: Capital of Northern Mesopotamia in the Third Millennium. The archaeology of Tell Hariri on the Euphrates. Oxford: Oxbow.
- "Mural Painting, Department of Near Eastern Antiquities: Mesopotamia". Louvre. Archived from the original on January 26, 2023.
- Parrot, André (1955). Discovering Buried Worlds. Philosophical Library, Inc. ISBN 978-0548450956.
- Robson, Eleanor (2008). Mathematics in ancient Iraq: a social history. Princeton University Press. ISBN 978-0-691-09182-2.
- Sasson, Jack (1998). "The King and I: A Mari King in Changing Perceptions". Journal of the American Oriental Society. 118 (4): 453–470. doi:10.2307/604782. hdl:1803/3562. JSTOR 604782.
- Wengrow, David (2018). What makes civilization? the ancient near East and the future of the west (first published in paperback ed.). Oxford: Oxford University Press. ISBN 978-0-19-969942-1.
