= Lion of Mari =

Ancient copper statue found in Syria

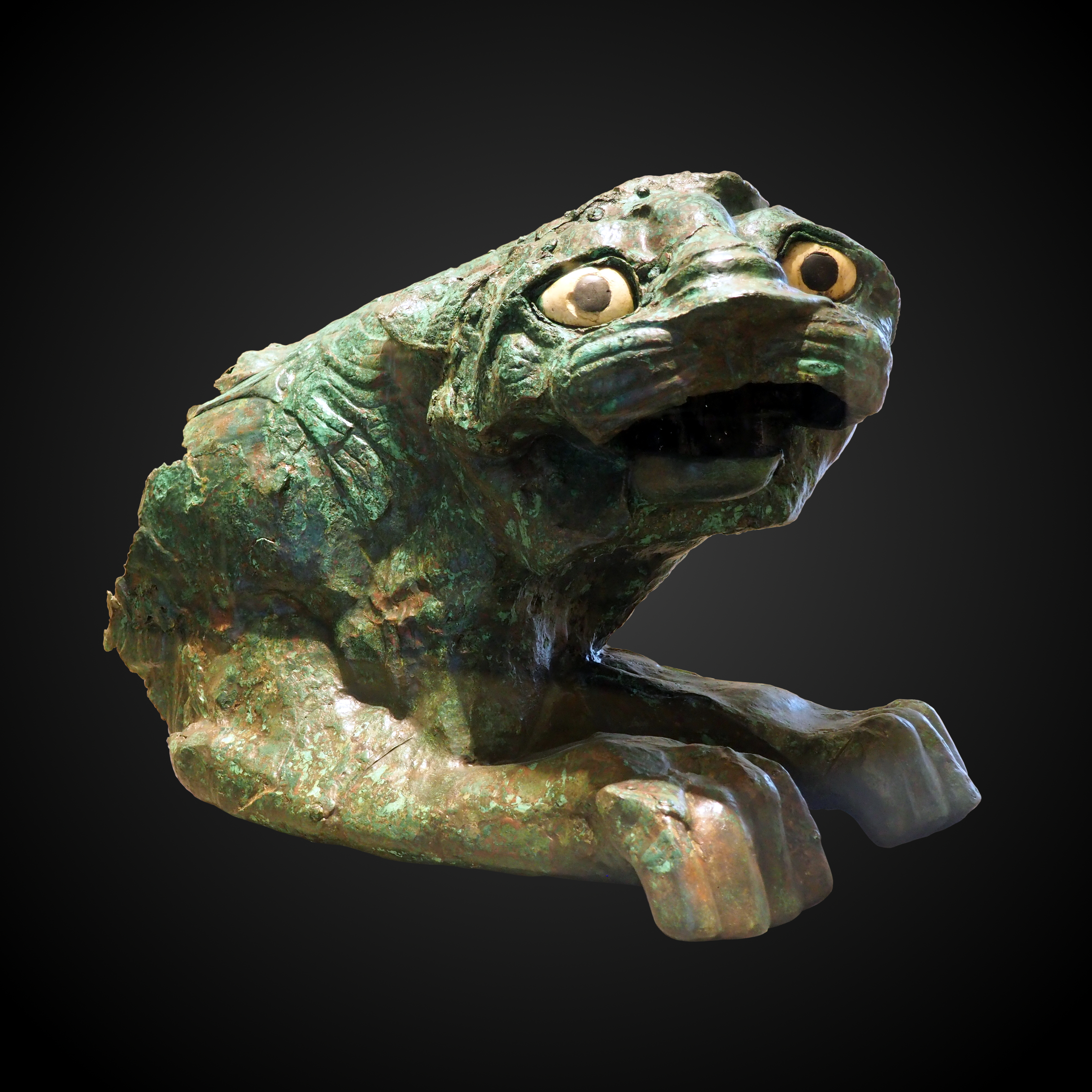
- Artist: Unknown
- Year: c. 1775–1761 BCE.
- Medium: Copped
- Subject: Lion
- Dimensions: 40 cm × 70 cm (16 in × 28 in)
- Location: Le Louvre, Paris
- Owner: Department of Near Eastern Antiquities of the Louvre
- Accession: AO 19520, AO 19824
- Website: Statue de lion

The Lion of Mari is a copper statue of a lion found in 1936 by André Parrot at the "Temple of Lions" in Mari, Syria. The statue is damaged, having been crushed during the destruction of the site, and only the anterior part of the body remains. It is currently on display in the Near Eastern Antiquities Department of the Louvre.

The "Temple of Lions" where the two lion statues were found is known to have been built by the Shakkanakku governor of Mari named Ishtup-Ilum circa 2150 BCE.

The Lion of Mari was probably produced to serve as Protome in the early Second Millennium BCE, at a time when the temple was being rebuilt, presumably during the reign of Zimrī-Lim (reigned c. 1775–1761 BCE.). It was excavated in 1936 by the Parrot expedition at the Temple of Dagon in Mari (now Tell Hariri, Syria) and is now on display at the Louvre; its twin figure is on display at the National Museum of Aleppo.

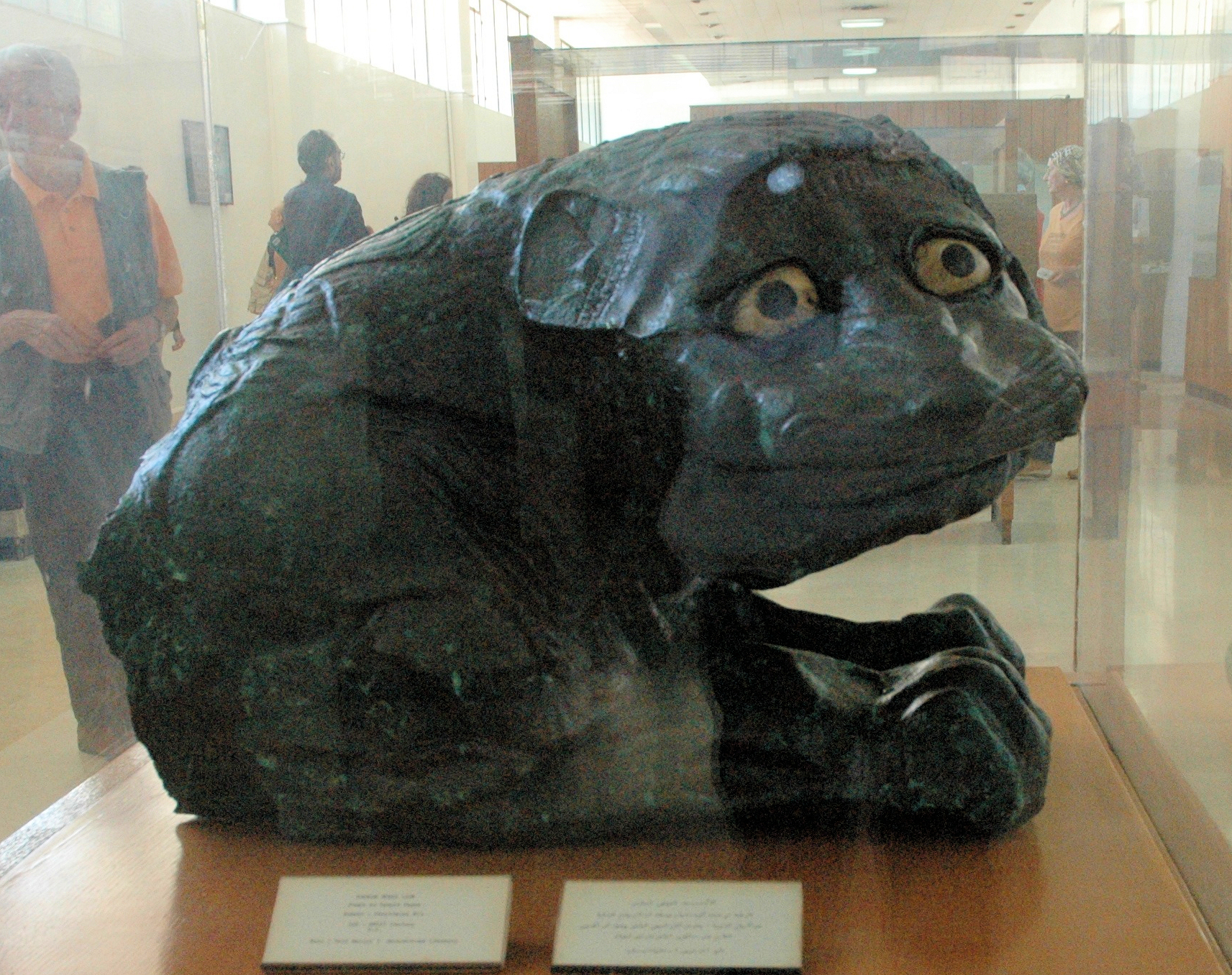
The other lion, in the Aleppo National Museum

== Sources ==
- Statue of a lion
- Les fouilles de Mari, André Parrot, Syria Année 1938 Volume 19 Numéro 1 pp. 1–29
