= List of kings of Mari =

The city of Mari in modern Syria was ruled by several dynasties in the Bronze Age. The history of the city is divided into three kingdoms. Rulers in orange are legendary figures with notably uncertain historicity.

== First kingdom ==
The Sumerian King List (SKL) records a dynasty of six kings from Mari enjoying hegemony between the dynasty of Adab and the dynasty of Kish. The names of the Mariote kings were damaged on the early copies of the list, and those kings were correlated with historical kings that belonged to the second kingdom. However, an undamaged copy of the list that date to the Old Babylonian period was discovered in Shubat-Enlil, and the names bears no resemblance to any of the historically attested monarchs of the second kingdom, indicating that the compilers of the list had an older and probably a legendary dynasty in mind, that predate the second kingdom.

#	Inscription	Ruler	Epithet	Reign	Notes
Early Dynastic IIIa period (c. 2600 – c. 2500 BC)
First Mariote kingdom (c. 2900 – c. 2500 BC)
"Then Adab was defeated and the kingship was taken to Mari." — SKL
1st		Anbu 𒀭𒁍		c. 2550 BC (60 years)	This name is also read as Ilshu; Said on the SKL to have held the title of, "King" of not just Mari; but, to have held the "Kingship" over all of Sumer; Known from the SKL; very little otherwise
2nd		Anba 𒀭𒁀		c. 2550 BC (12 years)	Historicity uncertain; Known from the SKL; very little otherwise; Said on the SKL to have held the title of, "King" of not just Mari; but, to have held the "Kingship" over all of Sumer; Son of Anbu
3rd		Bazi 𒁀𒍣	"the leatherworker"	c. 2550 BC (30 years)	Historicity uncertain; Known from the SKL; very little otherwise; Said on the SKL to have held the title of, "King" of not just Mari; but, to have held the "Kingship" over all of Sumer
4th		Zizi 𒍣𒍣	"the fuller"	c. 2550 BC (20 years)	Historicity uncertain; Known from the SKL; very little otherwise; Said on the SKL to have held the title of, "King" of not just Mari; but, to have held the "Kingship" over all of Sumer
5th		Limer 𒇷𒅎𒅕	"the 'gudug' priest" (Note: Gudug was a rank in the hierarchy of the Mesopotamian temple workers, a guduj priest was not specialized to a certain deity cult, and served in many temples.)	c. 2550 BC (30 years)	Historicity uncertain; Known from the SKL; very little otherwise; Said on the SKL to have held the title of, "King" of not just Mari; but, to have held the "Kingship" over all of Sumer
6th		Sharrum-iter 𒈗𒄿𒌁		c. 2550 BC (8 years)	Historicity uncertain; It has been suggested that only Sharrum-iter held the hegemony after Lugal-Anne-Mundu; Said on the SKL to have held the title of, "King" of not just Mari; but, to have held the "Kingship" over all of Sumer
"6 kings; they ruled for 184 years. Then Mari was defeated and the kingship was taken to Kish." — SKL

== Second kingdom ==
The chronological order of the kings from the second kingdom era is highly uncertain; nevertheless, it is assumed that the letter of Enna-Dagan lists them in a chronological order. Many of the kings were attested through their own votive objects discovered in the city, and the dates are highly speculative.

Depiction	Ruler	Reign	Notes
Early Dynastic IIIb period (c. 2500 – c. 2350 BC)
Second Mariote kingdom (c. 2500 – c. 2266 BC)
	Ikun-Mari 𒄣𒄿𒈠𒌷𒆠	c. 2500 BC	Held the title of, "King"; temp. of Ush; This name is inscribed on a jar in Mari
	Ikun-Shamash 𒄿𒆪𒀭𒌓	c. 2500 BC	Held the title of, "King"; May have ruled before the reign of Ur-Nanshe; temp. of Lugal-zage-si (?)
	Iku-Shamagan 𒄿𒆪𒀭𒊭𒈠𒃶	c. 2500 BC	Held the title of, "King"; temp. of Ur-Lumma; His name was inscribed on a votive statue offered by his official "Shibum"
	Ansud	c. 2423 – c. 2416 BC	His name is inscribed on a jar (as Hanusum) sent to Mari by Mesannepada of Ur; The name was read by Pettinato as Anubu
	Sa'umu	c. 2416 – c. 2400 BC	temp. of Kun-Damu; He was attested in Enna-Dagan's letter as conquering many lands
	Ishtup-Ishar 𒅖𒁾𒄿𒊬	c. 2400 BC	Held the title of, "King"; temp. of Il; He was attested in Enna-Dagan's letter as conquering Emar and other Eblaite vassals
	Iblul-Il 𒅁𒈜𒅋	c. 2380 BC	Held the title of, "King"; temp. of Igrish-Halam; He forced Ebla to pay tribute
	Nizi	c. 2360 BC	Held the title of, "King"; temp. of Enentarzi
	Enna-Dagan	c. 2355 BC	Held the title of, "King"; temp. of Irkab-Damu; He wrote a letter to Irkab-Damu of Ebla to assert Mari's authority
Proto-Imperial period (c. 2350 – c. 2266 BC)
	Ishqi-Mari 𒅖𒄄𒈠𒌷	c. 2350 - c. 2330 BC	temp. of Ur-Zababa; His name was previously read as Lamgi-Mari; Hypothetically the last king before the conquests of Akkad
	Ikun-Ishar 𒄿𒆪𒊬	c. 2320 BC	Held the title of, "King"; temp. of Meskigal; He forced Ebla to pay tribute
	Hidar	c. 2300 BC	Held the title of, "King"; temp. of Enshakushanna; He is attested in the archives of Ebla, which was destroyed during his reign

== Third kingdom ==
The third kingdom was ruled by two dynasties: the Shakkanakkus and the Lim. For the Shakkanakkus, the lists are incomplete and after Hanun-Dagan who ruled at the end of the Ur era c. 2008 BC (c. 1920 BC Short chronology), they become full of lacunae. Roughly 13 more Shakkanakkus succeeded Hanun-Dagan but only few are known, with the last known one reigning not too long before the reign of Yaggid-Lim who founded the Lim dynasty in c. 1830 BC, which was interrupted by Assyrian occupation in 1796–1776 BC.

Depiction	Ruler	Reign	Notes
Akkadian period (c. 2266 – c. 2154 BC)
Third Mariote kingdom (c. 2266 – c. 1761 BC)
Shakkanakku dynasty (c. 2266 – c. 1830 BC)
	Ididish	c. 2266 - c. 2206 BC	Held the title of, "Military Governor"
	Shu-Dagan	c. 2206 - c. 2200 BC	Held the title of, "Military Governor"; Son of Ididish
	Ishma-Dagan 𒅖𒈣𒀭𒁕𒃶	c. 2200 - c. 2154 BC	Held the title of, "Military Governor"
	Nûr-Mêr 𒉌𒉿𒅈𒈨𒅕	c. 2154 - c. 2148 BC	Held the title of, "Military Governor"; Son of Ishma-Dagan
Gutian period (c. 2154 – c. 2119 BC)
	Ishtup-Ilum 𒅖𒁾𒀭	c. 2148 – c. 2136 BC	Held the title of, "Military Governor"; Son of Ishma-Dagan
	Ishgum-Addu 𒅖𒄣𒀭𒅎	c. 2136 - c. 2127 BC	Held the title of, "Military Governor"
Ur III period (c. 2119 – c. 2004 BC)
	Apil-kin 𒀀𒉈𒄀	c. 2127 - c. 2091 BC	Was designated with the royal title Lugal in a votive inscription set by his daughter; Son of Ishgum-Addu
	Iddi-ilum 𒄿𒋾𒀭	c. 2091 - c. 2085 BC	His name is also read as Iddi-Ilum; his name was inscribed on his votive statue
	Ili-Ishar 𒀭𒄿𒊬	c. 2085 - c. 2072 BC	His name is inscribed on a brick
	Tura-Dagan 𒌅𒊏𒀭𒁕𒃶	c. 2072 - c. 2050 BC	Son of Apil-kin
	Puzur-Ishtar 𒆃𒊭𒁹𒁯	c. 2050 – c. 2025 BC	Used the royal title; Son of Tura-Dagan
	Hitlal-Erra	c. 2025 – c. 2017 BC	Used the royal title; Son of Puzur-Ishtar
	Hanun-Dagan	c. 2017 – c. 2008 BC	Used the royal title; Son of Puzur-Ishtar
Isin-Larsa period (c. 2004 – c. 1796 BC)
	Isi-Dagan	c. 2000 BC	This name is inscribed on a seal
	Ennin-Dagan	c. 1900 BC	Son of Isi-Dagan
	Itur-(...)	c. 1900 BC	This name is damaged, a gap separate him from Ennin-Dagan
	Amer-Nunu	c. 1900 BC	This name is inscribed on a seal
	Tir-Dagan	c. 1900 BC	Son of Itur-(...)
	Dagan-(...)	c. 1900 BC	This name is damaged and is the last attested Shakkanakku
Lim dynasty (c. 1830 – c. 1796 BC)
	Yaggid-Lim	c. 1830 – c. 1820 BC	He may have ruled in Suprum rather than in Mari
	Yahdun-Lim	c. 1820 – c. 1797 BC	Son of Yaggid-Lim
	Sumu-Yamam	c. 1797 – c. 1796 BC	
Old Assyrian period (c. 1796 – c. 1761 BC)
Dynasty of Shamshi-Adad (c. 1796 – c. 1776 BC)
	Yasmah-Adad	c. 1796 – c. 1776 BC	Son of Shamshi-Adad I
	Ishar-Lim	c. 1776 – c. 1775 BC	He was an Assyrian official who usurped the throne for a few months between Yasmah-Adad's escape and Zimri-Lim's arrival
Lim restoration (c. 1776 – c. 1761 BC)
	Zimri-Lim 𒍣𒅎𒊑𒇷𒅎	c. 1775 – c. c. 1760 BC	

== Gallery ==
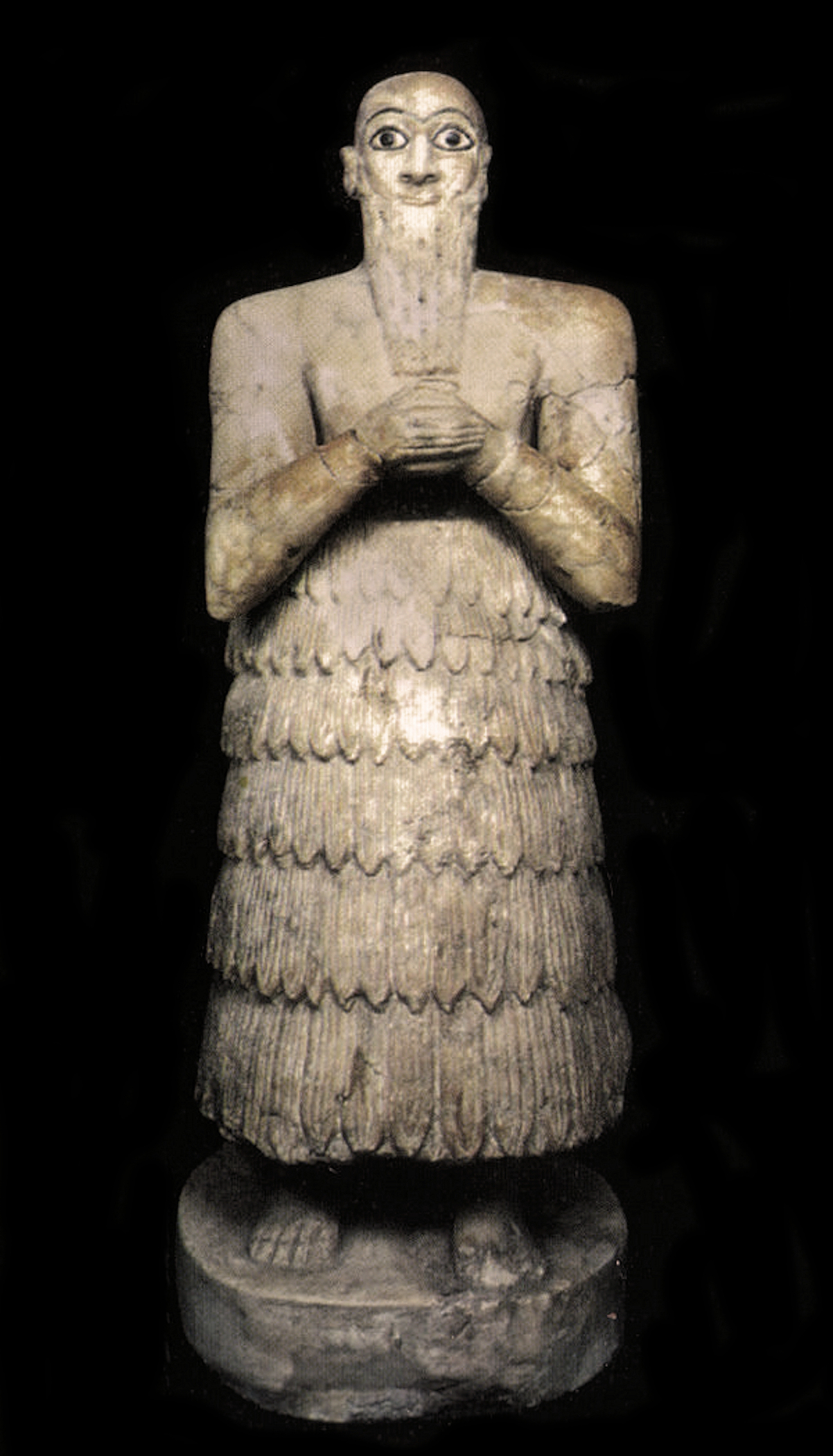
Statue of Iku-Shamagan, c. 2453 BC. Temple of Ninni-Zaza, Mari. National Museum of Damascus.

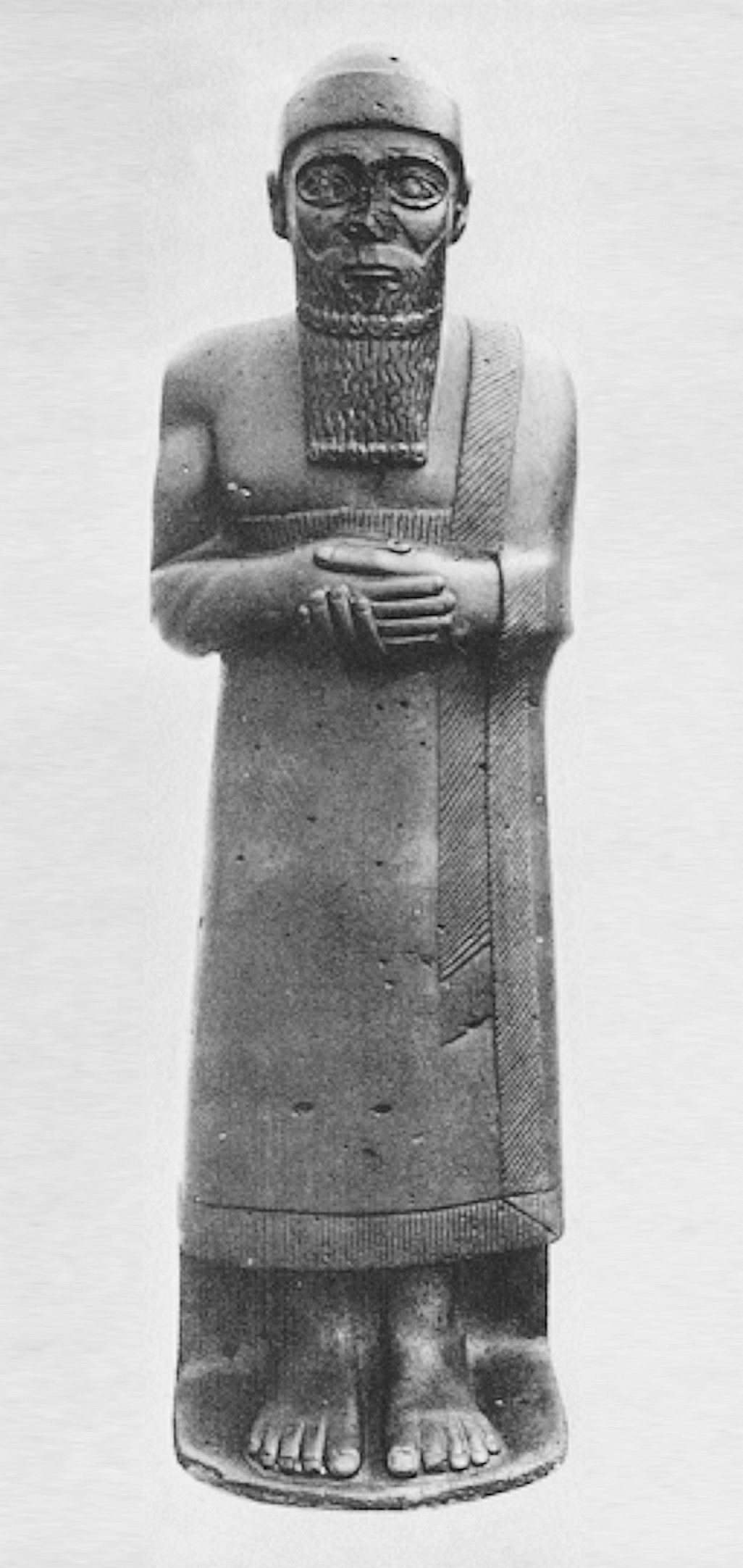
Ishtup-Ilum, Shakkanakku of Mari (c. 2150 BC)

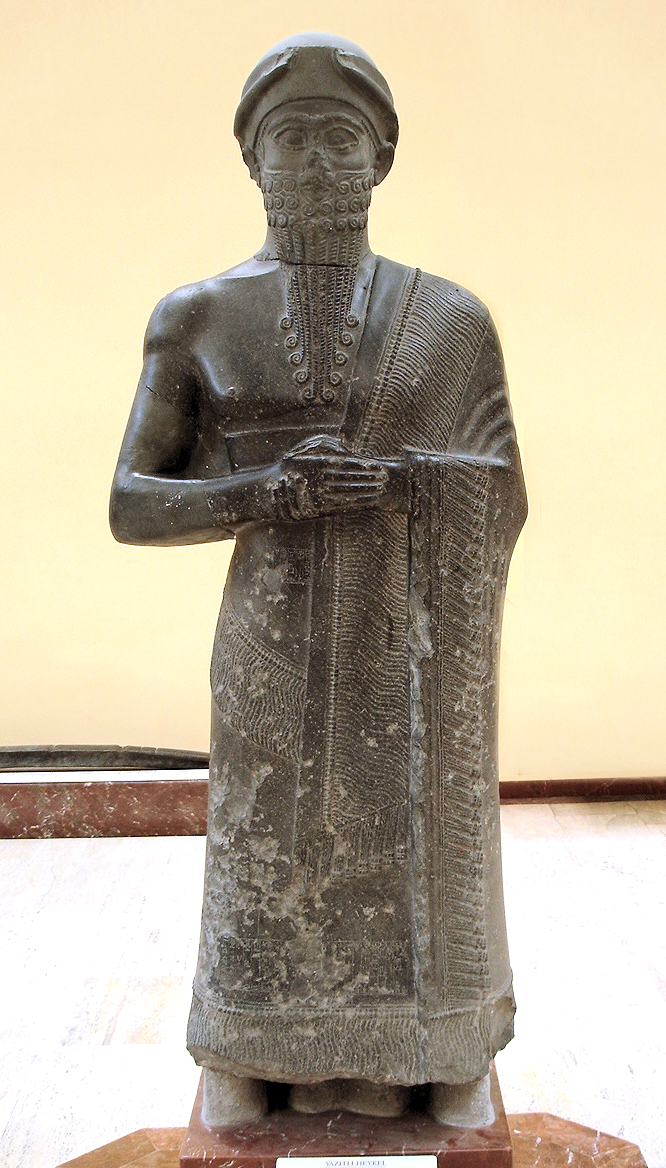
Puzur-Ishtar, Shakkanakku of Mari (c. 2050 BC)
