= Ishgum-Addu =

Ishgum-Addu 𒅖𒆲𒀭𒁕𒃶

King of Mari
- Reign: c. 2136 - c. 2127 BC
- Predecessor: Ishtup-Ilum
- Successor: Apil-kin
- Died: c. 2127 BC
- Issue: Apil-kin
- Dynasty: Shakkanakku dynasty

Location of Mari

Ishgum-Addu or Ishgum-Addad (𒅖𒄣𒀭𒅎 iš-gum ^{D}IŠKUR), or more probably Ishkun-Dagan (𒅖𒆲𒀭𒁕𒃶 iš-kun ^{D}da-gan; died c. 2127 BC), was a ruler of the city of Mari, northern Mesopotamia, for eight years c. 2136-2127 BC, after the fall of Akkad. He had a son named Apil-kin according to the Shakkanakku Dynasty List, who ruled after him.

Ishgum-Addu appears in the Shakkanakku Dynasty Lists after Ishtup-Ilum. Besides his mention on the Shakkanakku List, no inscriptions are known of him.

Ishgum-Addu of Mari
Regnal titles
Preceded by Ishtup-Ilum	King of Mari c. 2136 - c. 2127 BC	Succeeded by Apil-kin
