= Hanun-Dagan =

King of Mari
- Reign: c. 2017 – c. 2008 BC
- Predecessor: Hitlal-Erra
- Died: c. 2008 BC
- Father: Puzur-Ishtar

Hanun-Dagan (meaning "Dagan is merciful"; died c. 2008 BC), was the Shakkanakku and king (Lugal) of Mari, reigning c. 2016-2008 BC. He was the brother of his predecessor Hitlal-Erra, and is recorded as the son of Shakkanakku Puzur-Ishtar on a seal discovered in the city. Although the title of Shakkanakku designated a military governor, the title holders in Mari were independent monarchs, and nominally under the vassalage of the Ur III dynasty. Some Shakkanakkus used the royal title Lugal in their votive inscriptions, while using the title of Shakkanakku in their correspondence with the Ur's court, and it is certain that Hanun-Dagan used the royal title.

Hanun-Dagan was a contemporary of Ibbi-Sin of Ur, and is credited with renovating the Royal Palace of Mari. Unlike most of their predecessors who bore Akkadian names, both Hanun-Dagan and his brother Hitlal-Erra bore Amorite names, and seals in Mari records Hitlal-Erra as a military official under Puzur-Ishtar, leading Piotr Michalowski to suspect a coup that deposed the family of Puzur-Ishtar and replaced it with Hanun-Dagan's family. The succession of Shakkanakkus following Hanun-Dagan's reign is difficult to determine as the lists are full of gaps.

Shakkanakku Hanun-Dagan of Mari
Regnal titles
Preceded by Hitlal-Erra	King of Mari c. 2017 – c. 2008 BC	Succeeded by
