= Nûr-Mêr =

Nûr-Mêr 𒉌𒉿𒅈𒈨𒅕

King of Mari
- Reign: c. 2154 - c. 2148 BC
- Predecessor: Ishma-Dagan
- Successor: Ishtup-Ilum
- Died: c. 2148 BC
- Dynasty: Shakkanakku dynasty
- Father: Ishma-Dagan

Location of Mari

Nûr-Mêr, also Niwâr-Mêr (𒉌𒉿𒅈𒈨𒅕 ni-wa-ar-me-er; died c. 2148 BC) was a ruler of the city of Mari, one of the military governors known as Shakkanakku in northern Mesopotamia, in the later period of Akkad. According to the dynastic lists, he ruled for 5 years, after his father Ishma-Dagan, and was the fourth Shakkanakku ruler. Nûr-Mêr was probably contemporary with the Akkadian rulers Naram-Sin or Shar-Kali-Sharri. He was succeeded by his brother Ishtup-Ilum as Shakkanakku of Mari.

He is also known from four identical inscriptions on bronze votive tablets:

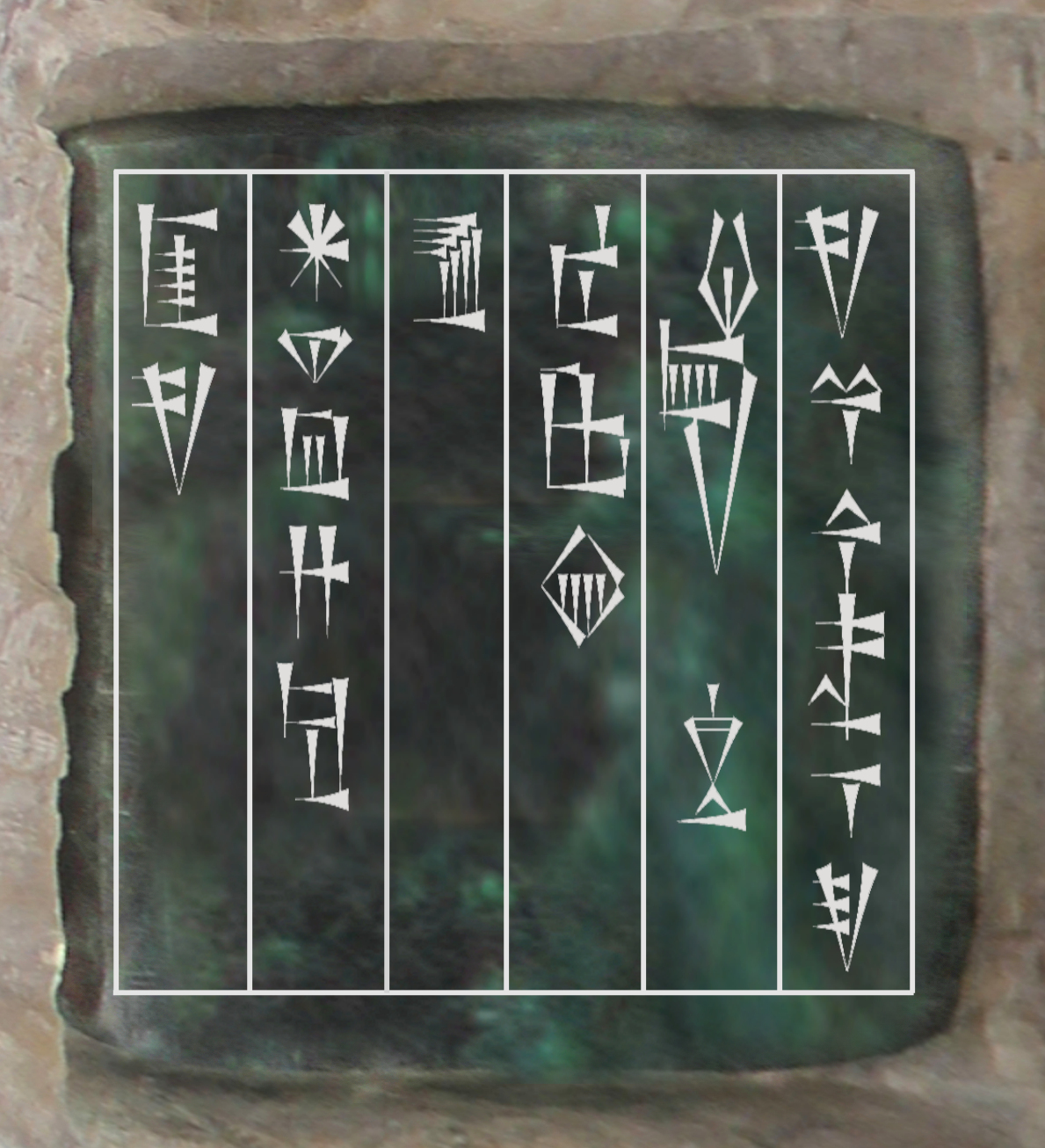
Nur-Mer bronze votive plate inscription (reconstitution with standard Sumero-Akkadian cuneiform).

𒉌𒉿𒅈𒈨𒅕 𒄊𒀴 𒈠𒌷𒆠 𒂍 𒀭𒊩𒌆𒉺𒂅 𒅁𒉌

ni-wa-ar-me-er shagina mari-ki e ninhursag ib-ni

"Niwâr-Mêr, Shakkanakku of Mari, built the temple of the goddess Ninhursag"

— Votive tablet of Niwâr-Mêr.

The goddess mentioned might have been the Syrian Shalash, the wife of Dagan, rather than Mesopotamian Ninhursag, as her name was commonly written logographically as ^{d}NIN.HUR.SAG.GA in Mari in the Old Babylonian period.

Nûr-Mêr Mari
Regnal titles
Preceded by Ishma-Dagan	King of Mari c. 2154 - c. 2148 BC	Succeeded by Ishtup-Ilum
