= Ikun-Mari =

Ikun-Mari 𒄣𒄿𒈠𒌷𒆠
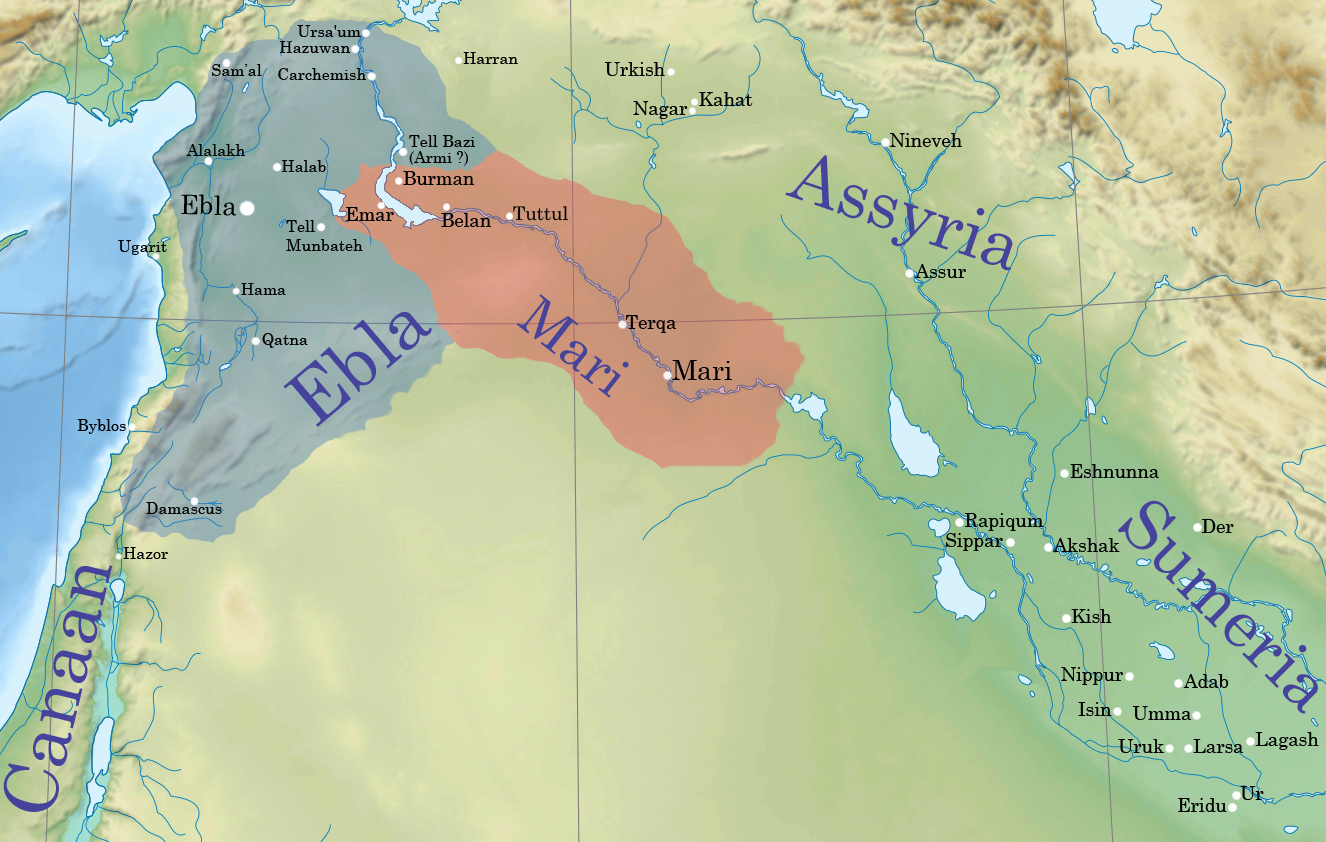
- Mari at the time of Iblul-il

King of Mari
- Reign: c. 2500 BC
- Spouse: Alma

Ikun-Mari (fl. c. 2500 BC) was a king (Lugal) of the second Mariote kingdom. His name was recorded on a stone jar mentioning his wife "Alma". The script's style on the jar suggest a date later than the reign of the Mariote king Ikun-Shamash but earlier than the reign of king Isqi-Mari.

Queen Alma is mentioned in Eblaite texts that also mention the Mariote king Nizi and princes (later kings) Enna-Dagan and Hidar.

King Ikun-Mari of Mari
Regnal titles
Preceded by	King of Mari c. 2500 BC	Succeeded by
