= Ishma-Dagan =

Ishma-Dagan 𒅖𒈣𒀭𒁕𒃶
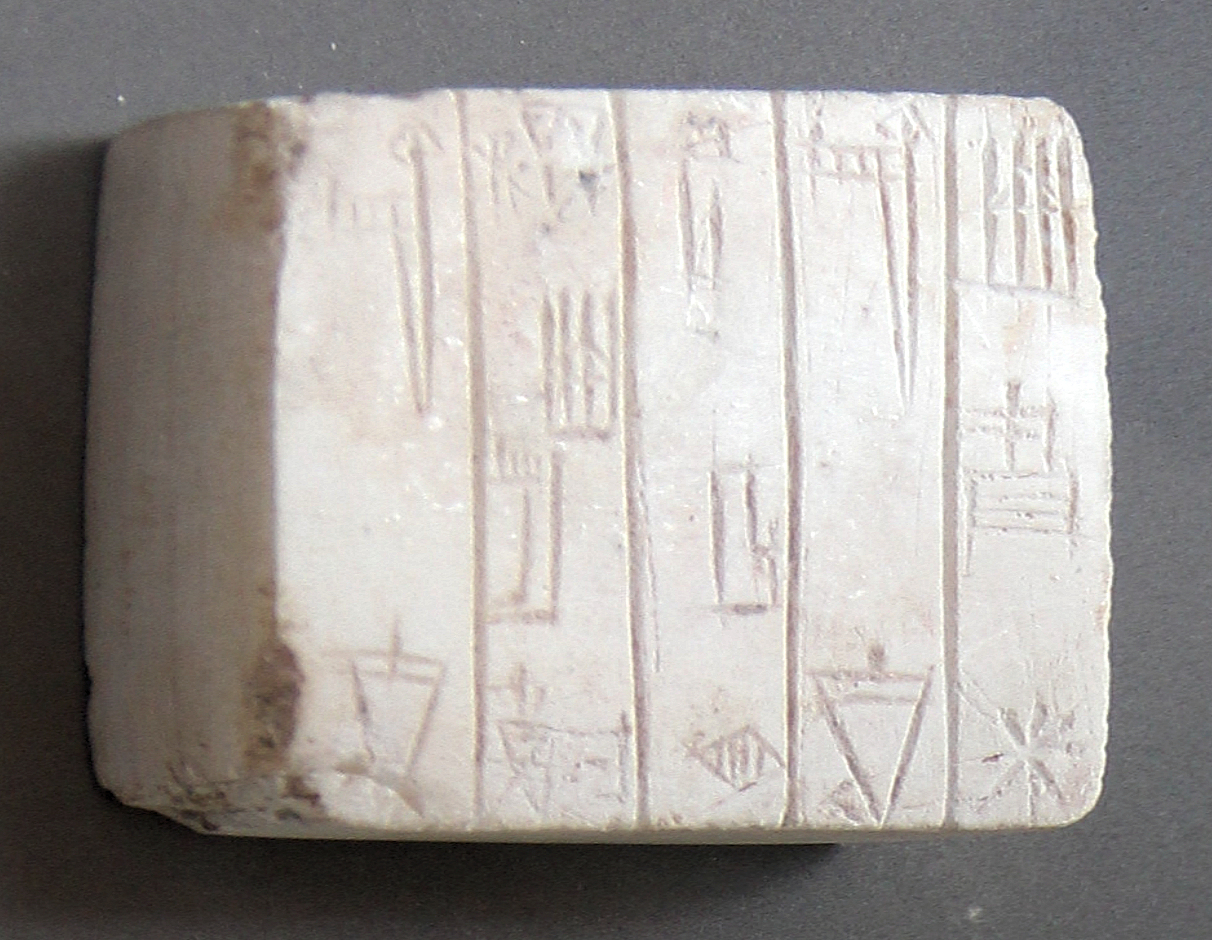
- Tablet of Ishtup-Ilum mentioning his father Ishma-Dagan. Obverse: "Ishtup-Ilum Shakkanakku of Mari, son of Ishma-Dagan, Shakkanakku". Reverse (hidden from view): "of Mari, the Temple of the King of the Country has built". Louvre Museum.

King of Mari
- Reign: c. 2200 - c. 2154 BC
- Predecessor: Shu-Dagan
- Successor: Nûr-Mêr
- Died: c. 2154 BC
- Issue: Nur-Mer; Ishtup-Ilum
- Dynasty: Shakkanakku dynasty

Location of Mari

Ishma-Dagan (𒅖𒈣𒀭𒁕𒃶, Ish-ma-^{D}da-gan; died c. 2154 BC) was a ruler of the city of Mari, one of the military governors known as Shakkanakku in northern Mesopotamia, in the later period of Akkad. According to the dynastic lists, he ruled for 45 years, after Shu-Dagan, and was the third Shakkanakku ruler. Ishma-Dagan was probably contemporary with the Akkadian ruler Shar-Kali-Sharri. He had two sons who succeeded him in turn as Shakkanakkus of Mari: Nûr-Mêr and Ishtup-Ilum.

He is also known from inscriptions by his son Ishtup-Ilum mentioning his father, in dedication tablets for the building of a temple:

"Ishtup-Ilum, Shakkanakku of Mari, son of Ishma-Dagan, Shakkanakku of Mari, built the Temple for the "King of the country"

— Dedication tablet of Ishtup-Ilum.

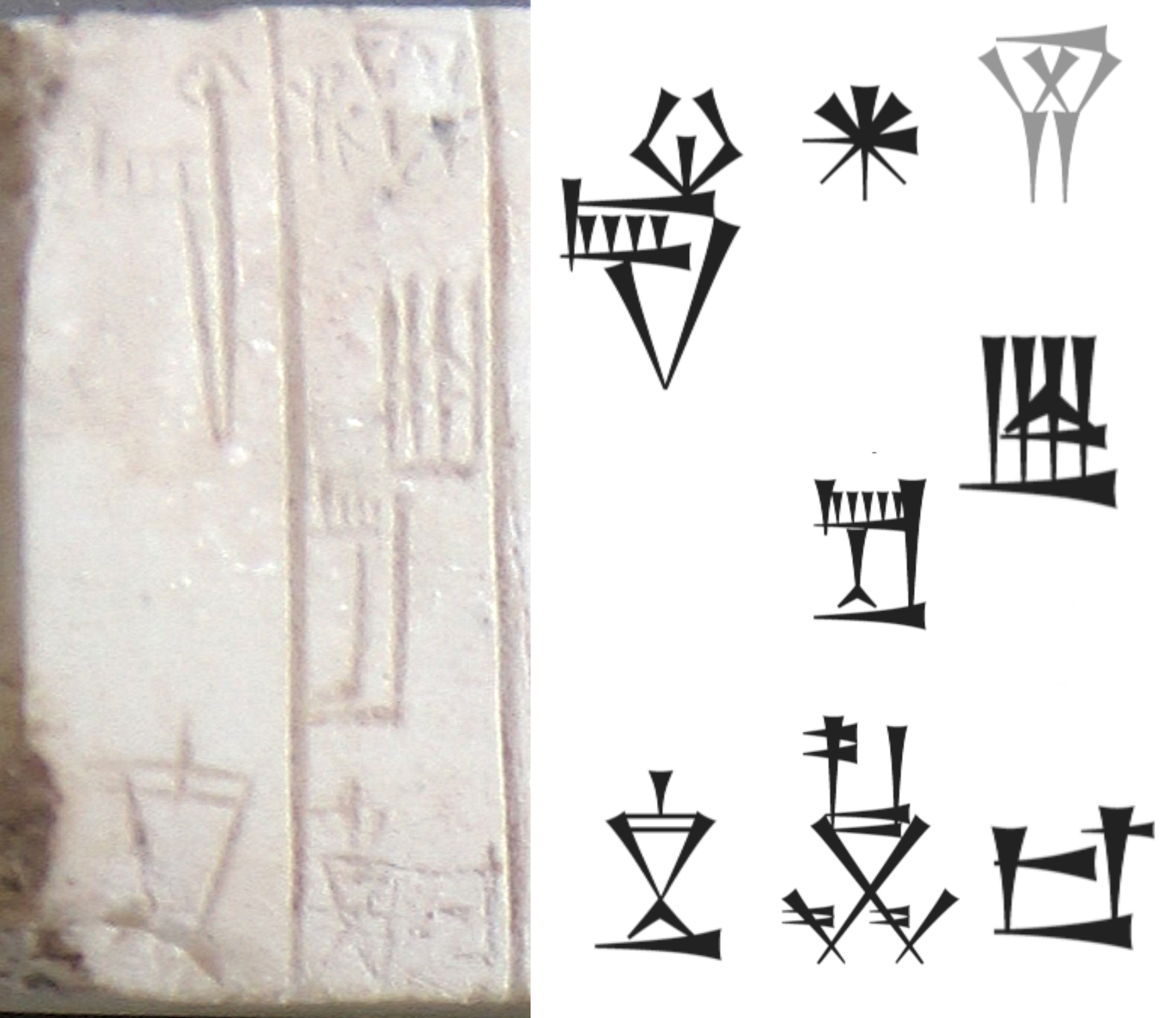
"Ishma-Dagan, Shakkanakku" on the tablet of his son Ishtup-Ilum. The character at the top right corner is 𒌉 dumu, "son of..."

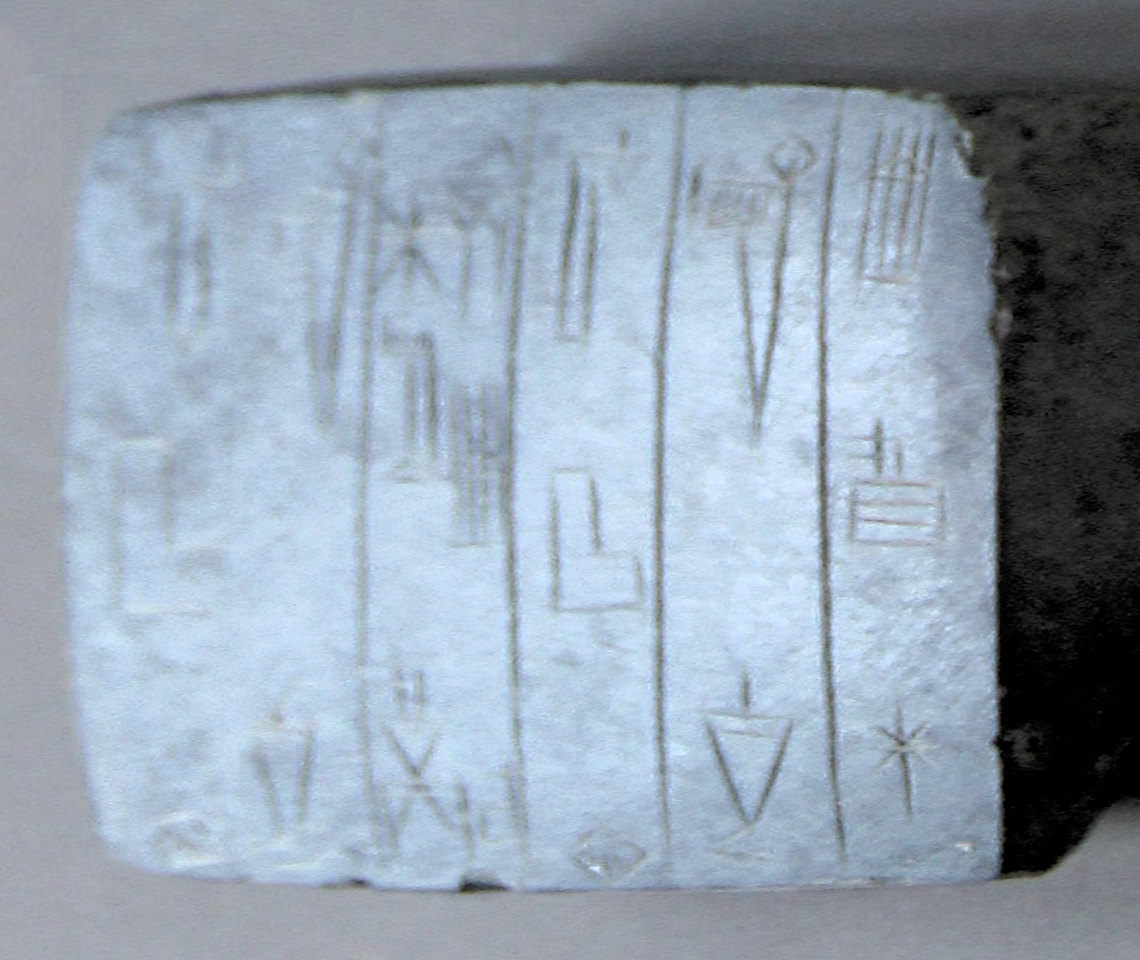
Another tablet of Ishtup-Ilum. Obverse: "Ishtup-Ilum Shakkanakku of Mari, son of Ishma-Dagan, Shakkanakku of Mari". Louvre Museum.

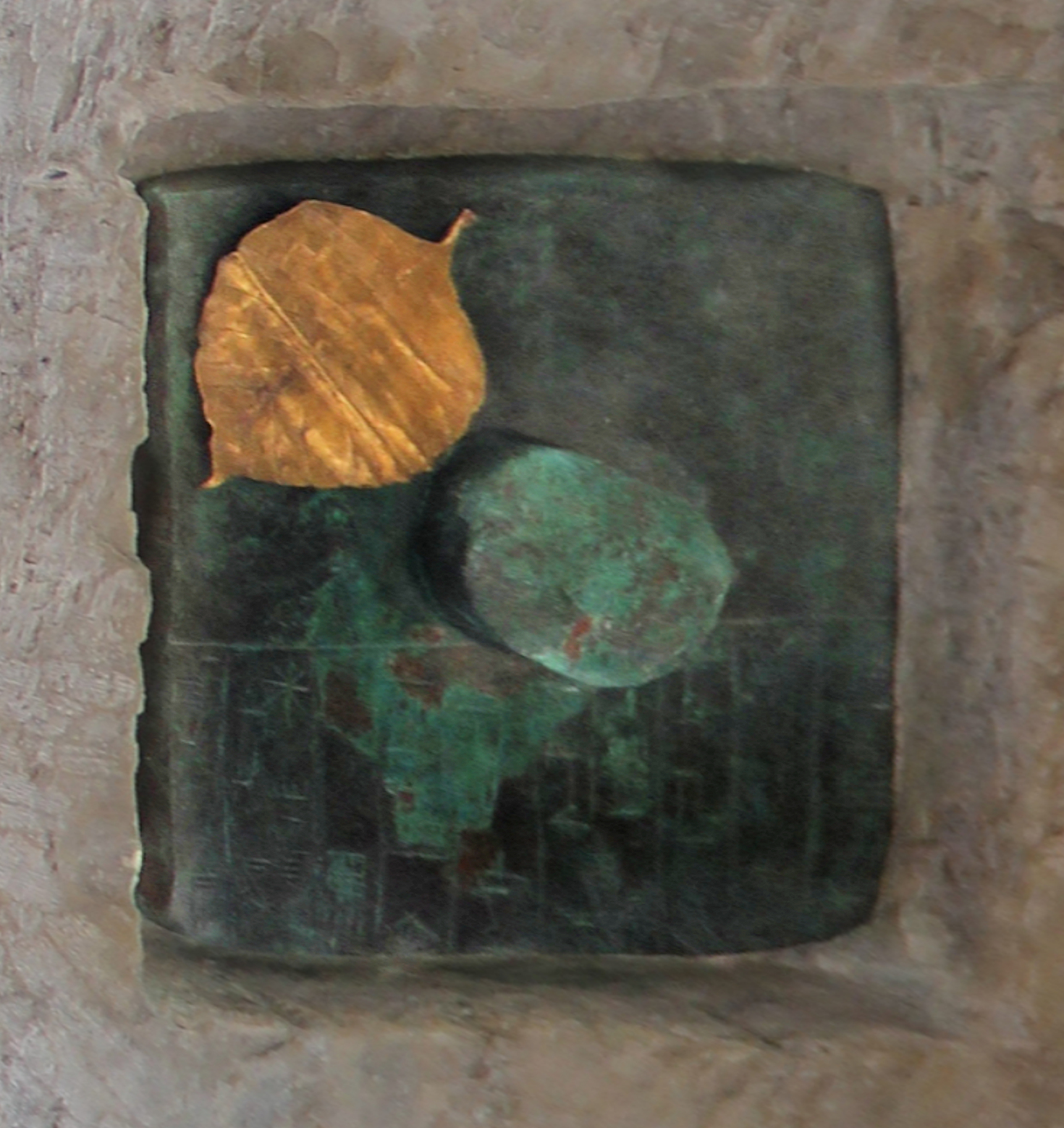
Ishtup-Ilum foundation deposit for the Temple of Lions, Mari. Tablet inscription: "Ishtup-Ilum Shakkanakku of Mari, son of Ishma-Dagan, Shakkanakku of Mari, the Temple of the King of the Country he has built". Louvre Museum AO 19827

Ishma-Dagan Mari
Regnal titles
Preceded by Shu-Dagan	King of Mari c. 2200 - c. 2154 BC	Succeeded by Nûr-Mêr
