= Ishtup-Ilum =

Ishtup-Ilum 𒅖𒁾𒀭
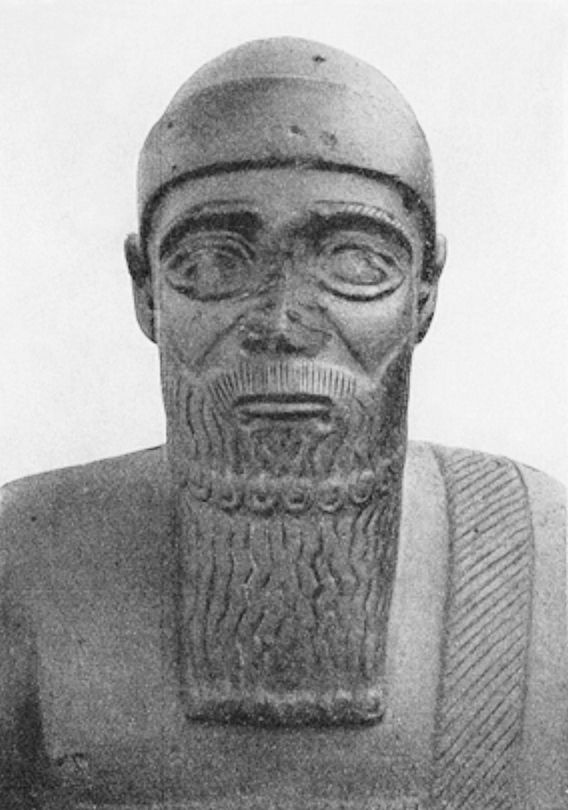
- Statue of Ishtup-Ilum

King of Mari
- Reign: c. 2148 – c. 2136 BC
- Predecessor: Nûr-Mêr
- Successor: Ishgum-Addu
- Died: c. 2136 BC
- Dynasty: Shakkanakku dynasty
- Father: Ishma-Dagan

Location of Mari

Ishtup-Ilum, also Ishtup-El (𒅖𒁾𒀭, Ish-dub-ilum; died c. 2136 BC) was a ruler of the city of Mari, one of the military governors known as Shakkanakku in northern Mesopotamia, after the fall of Akkad. He was probably a contemporary with the Second Dynasty of Lagash, around the time of Gudea. He was the son of Ishma-Dagan and brother of Nûr-Mêr, both Shakkanakkus of Mari before him, and, according to the dynastic lists, he ruled after them for a period of 11 years.

== Attestations ==
He is known from inscriptions mentioning the building of a temple, as well as from a monumental statue, discovered in Mari.

=== Statue of Ishtup-Ilum ===
His statue was discovered by the team of André Parrot on 14 March 1936 in Mari. It has a rather simple and coarse design, a provincial characteristic during this period, and is significantly less sophisticated than the statues of his successors, such as Puzur-Ishtar. The statue is now in the Aleppo National Museum, Syria.

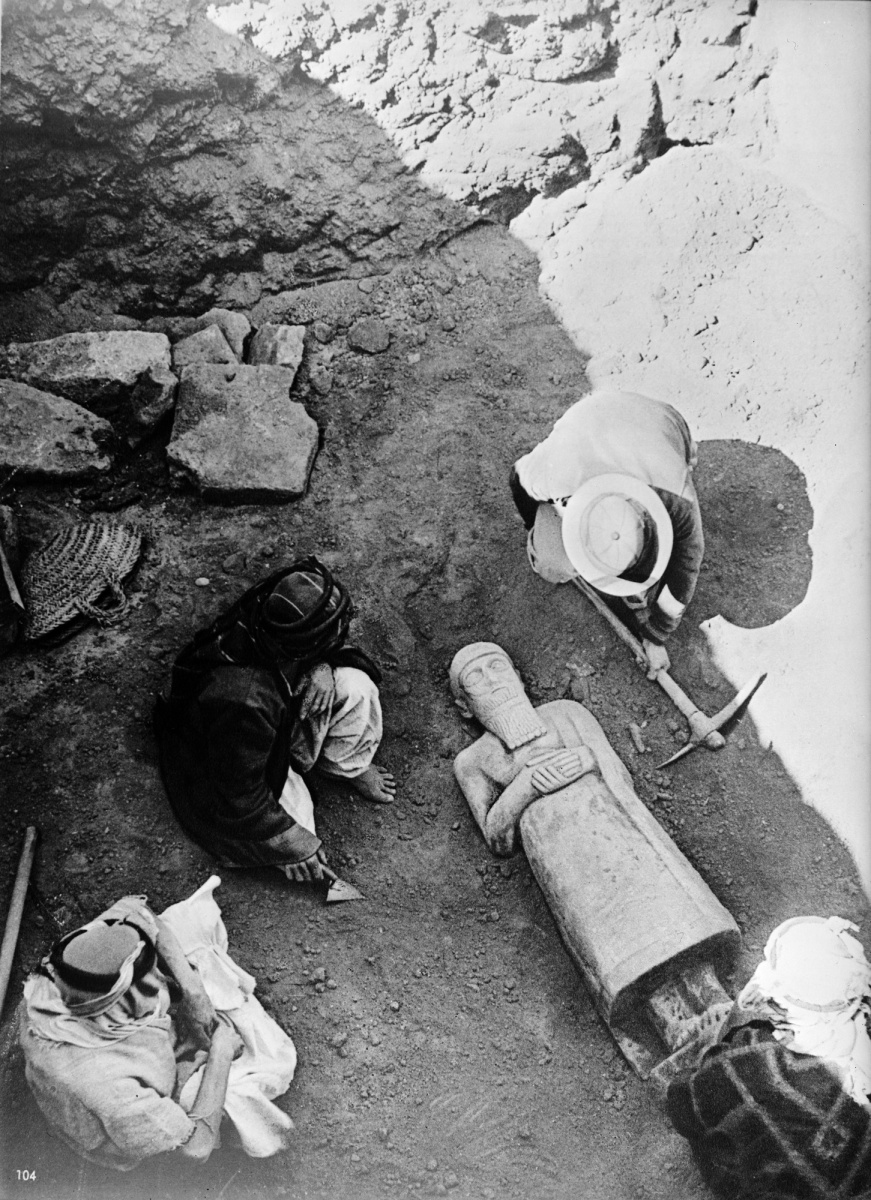
Ishtup-Ilum excavation in Mari, Syria in 1936, under André Parrot

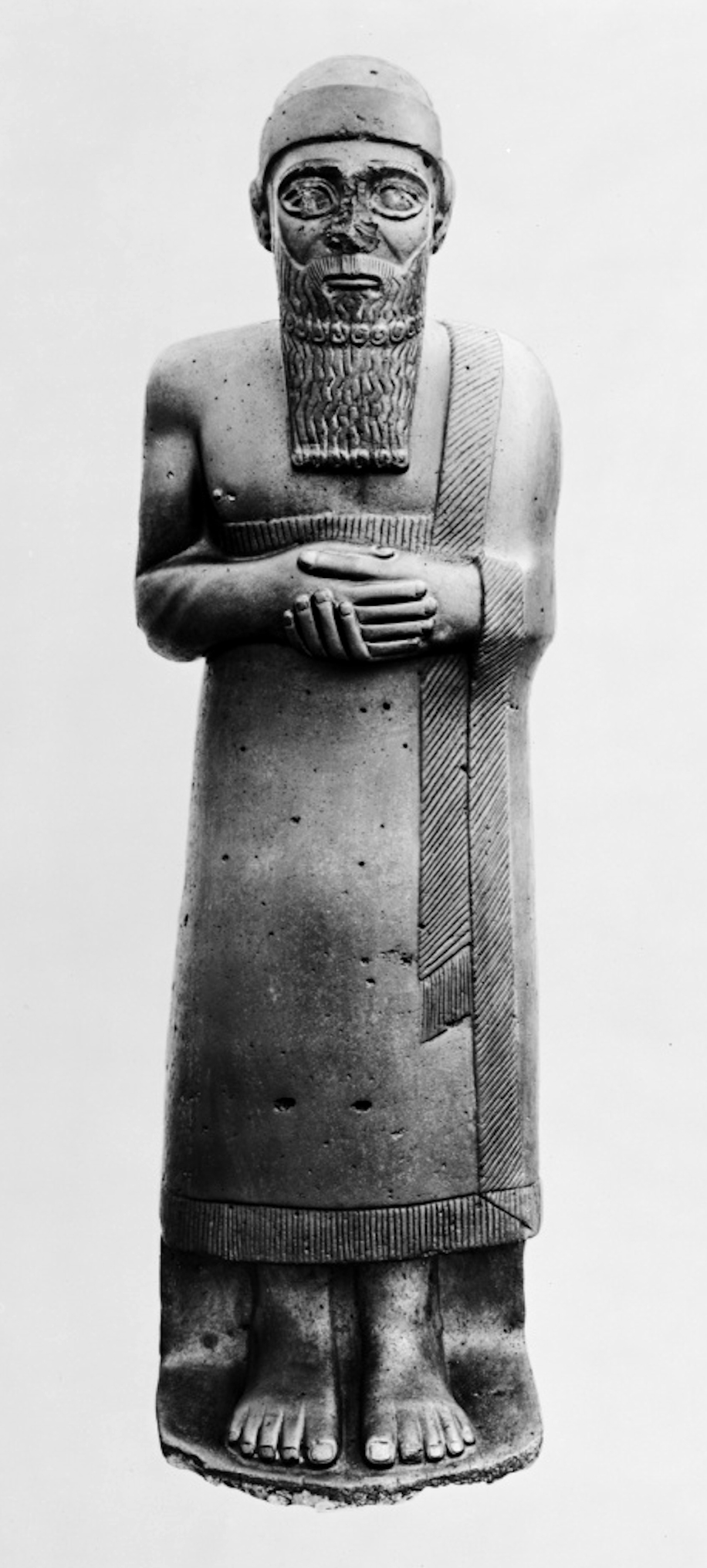
Ishtup-Ilum statue (front)

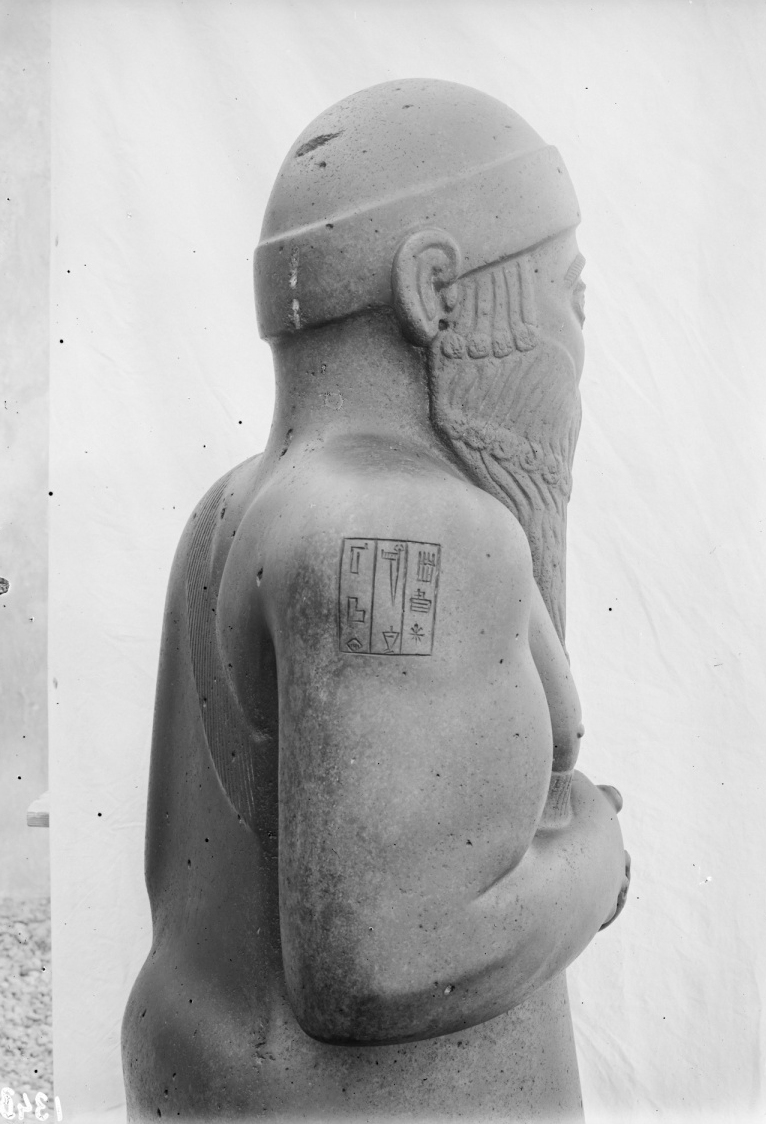
Ishtup-Ilum statue (back, with inscription)

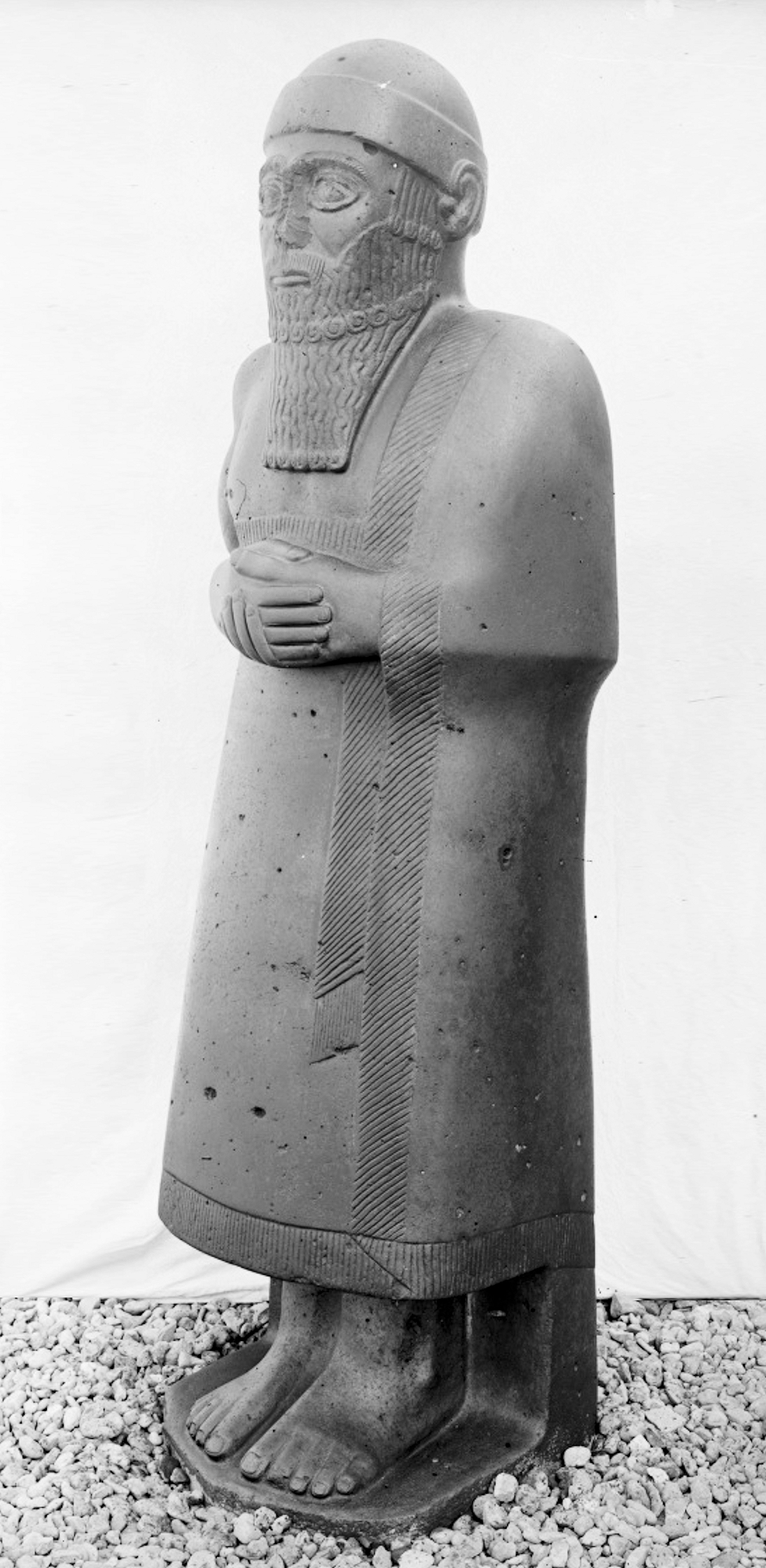
Ishtup-Illum statue (three quarters)

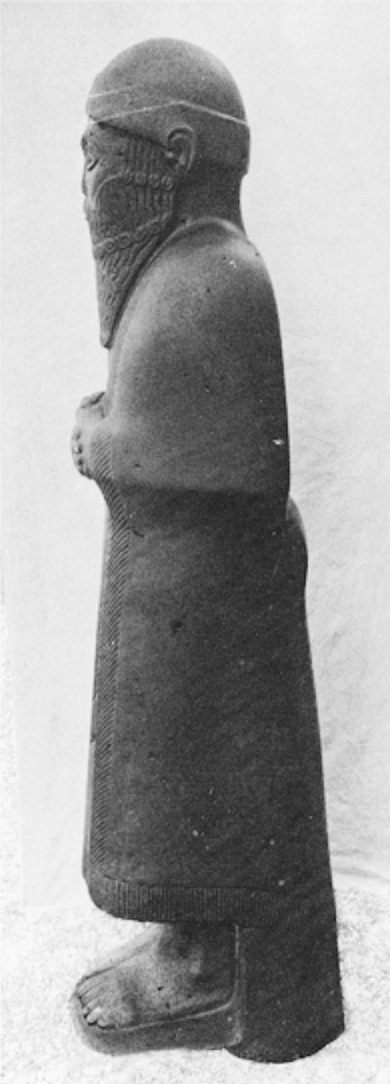
Ishtup-Illum statue (side)

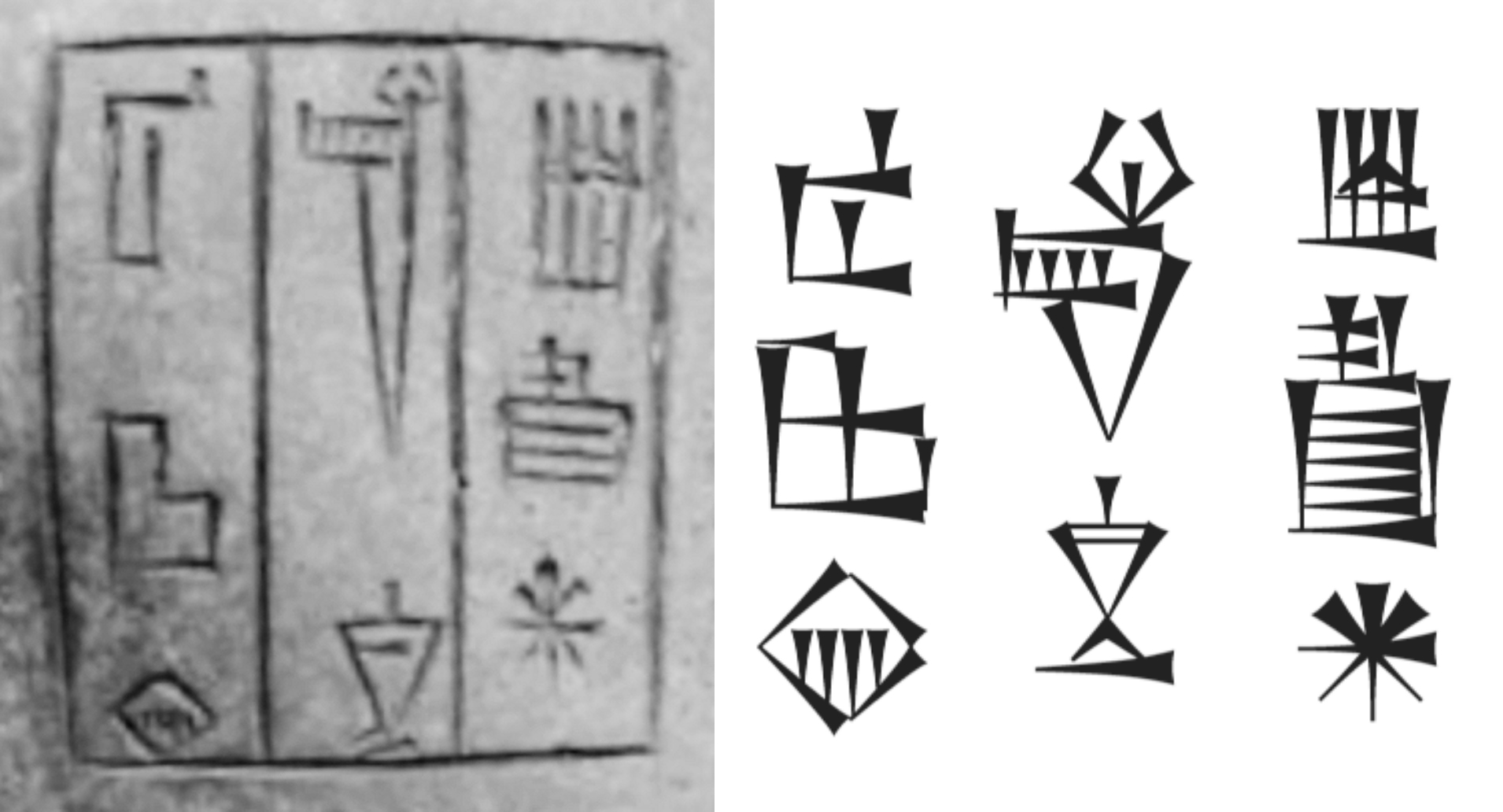
Ishtup-Ilum cuneiform inscription on the statue: "Ishtup-Ilum, Shakkanakku of Mari" (𒅖𒁾𒀭 𒄊𒀴 𒈠𒌷𒆠 Ishtup-Ilum Shakkanakku Mari-ki)

=== Dedication tablets ===
Ishtup-Ilum is also known from a dedication tablet for the "Temple of the King of the Country" (either Dagan or Enlil) with the inscription:

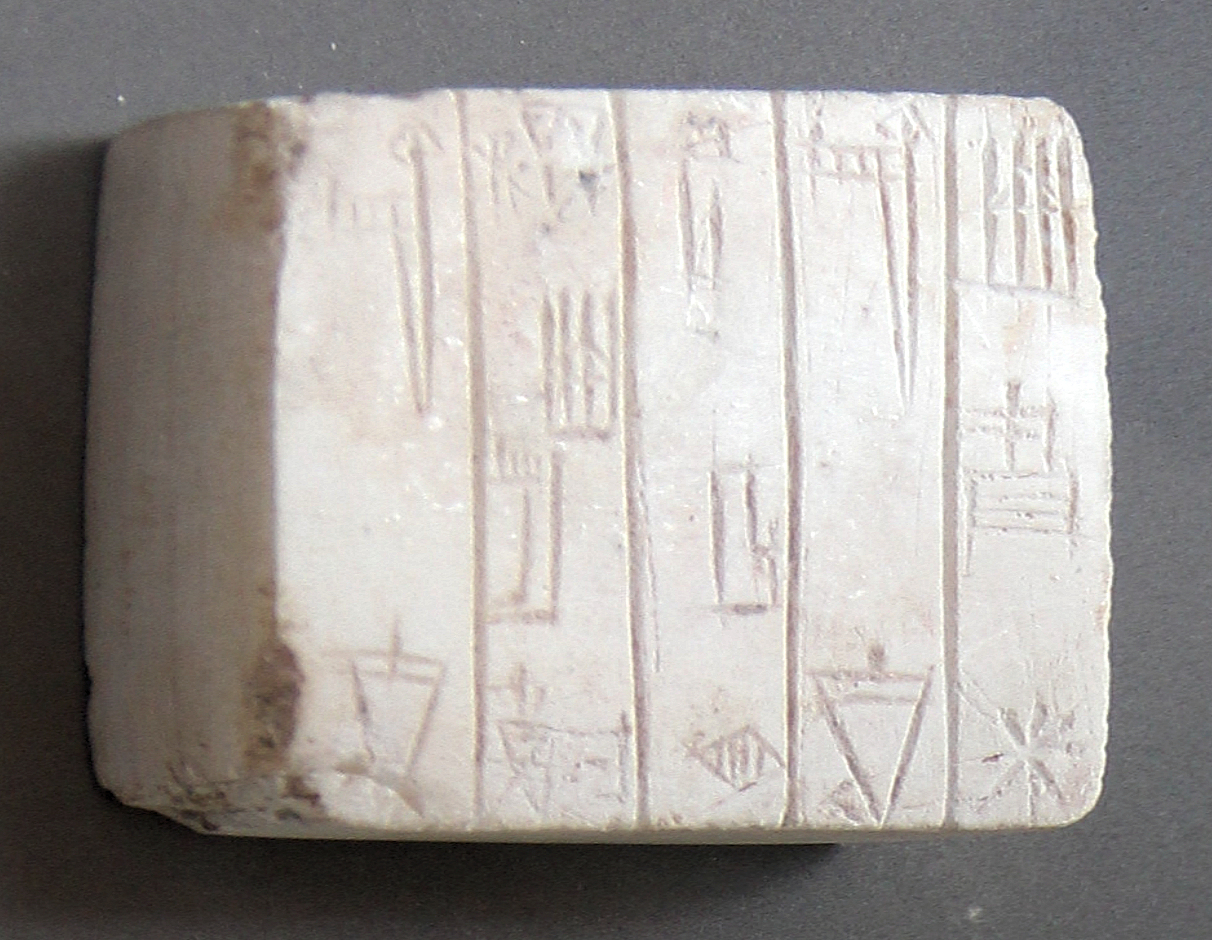

𒅖𒁾𒀭 / 𒄊𒀴 𒈠𒌷𒆠 / 𒌉𒅖𒈣𒀭𒁕𒃶 / 𒄊𒀴 𒈠𒌷𒆠 / 𒂍 / 𒀭𒈗𒈤𒁴 / 𒅁𒉌

Ishtup-Ilum / Shakkanakku Mari-ki / dumu Ishma-Dagan / Shakkanakku Mari-ki / e / ^{d}Lugal-mādim / ibni

"Ishtup-Ilum, Shakkanakku of Mari, son of Ishma-Dagan, Shakkanakku of Mari, built the Temple for God Lugal-mātim (the "Lord of the Land", identified with Dagan or Enlil)"

— Dedication tablet of Ishtup-Ilum

This implies that Ishtup-Ilum was the builder of this "Temple of the King of the Country", in which were also discovered beautiful copper statues of guardian lions, the "Lions of Mari", probably installed later during a rebuilding of the temple in the early 2nd millennium BCE. The Temple was excavated in 1938 by André Parrot.

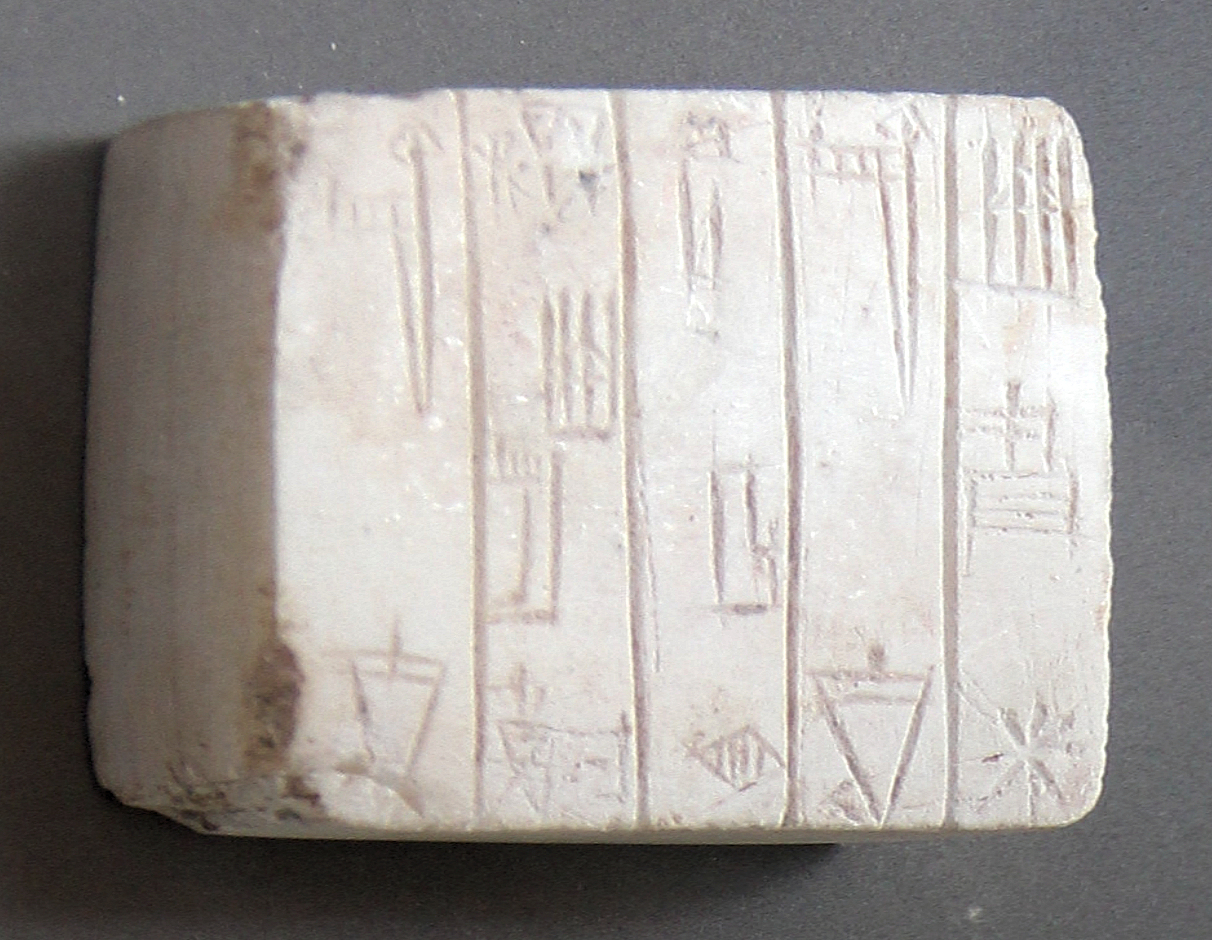
Tablet of Ishtup-Ilum. Obverse: "Ishtup-Ilum Shakkanakku of Mari, son of Ishma-Dagan, Shakkanakku". Reverse (hidden from view): " of Mari, the Temple of the King of the Country he has built". Louvre Museum AO 19823

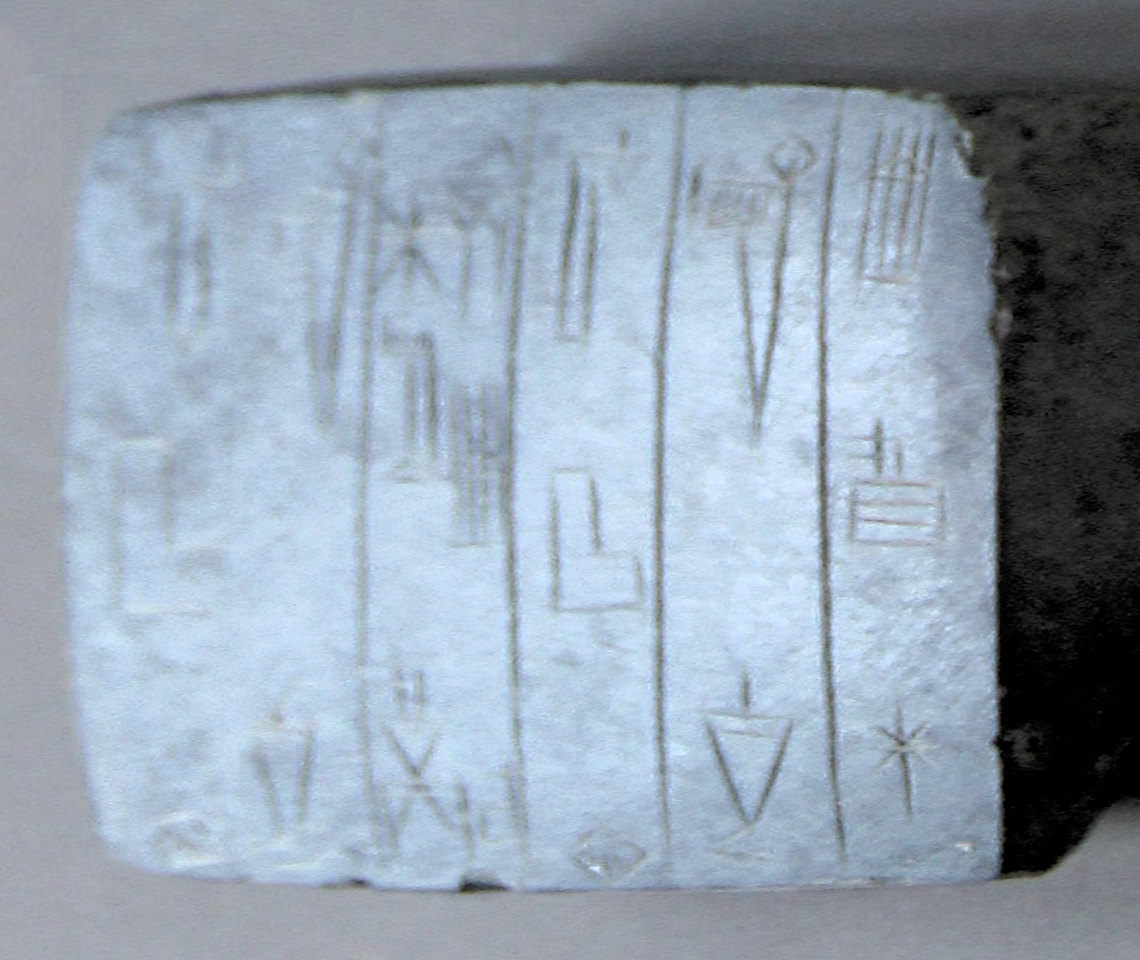
Another tablet of Ishtup-Ilum. Obverse: "Ishtup-Ilum Shakkanakku of Mari, son of Ishma-Dagan, Shakkanakku of Mari". Louvre Museum

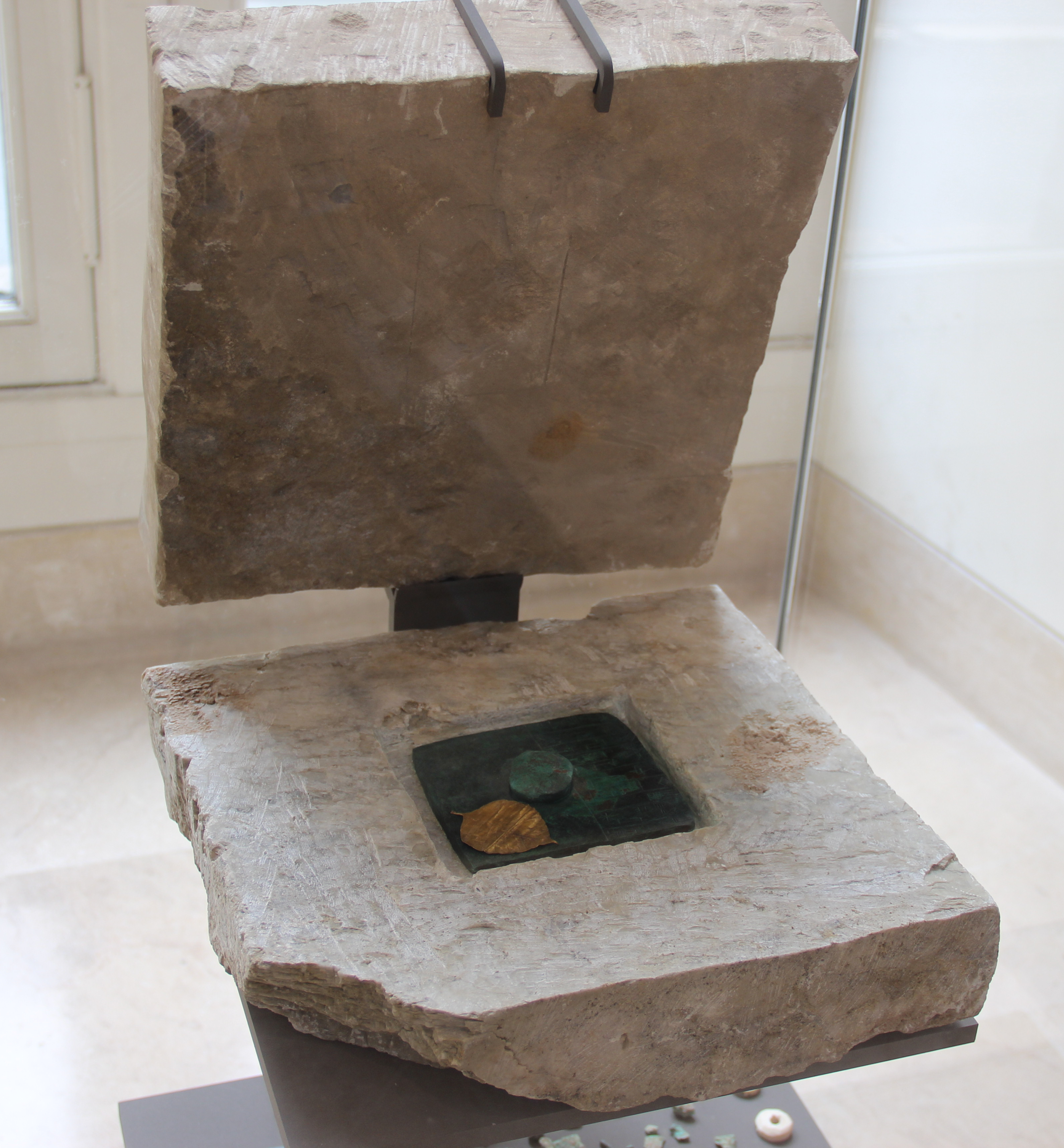
Ishtup-Ilum deposit for the "Temple of Lions", Mari with dedication tablet of Ishtup-Ilum. Louvre Museum AO 19827

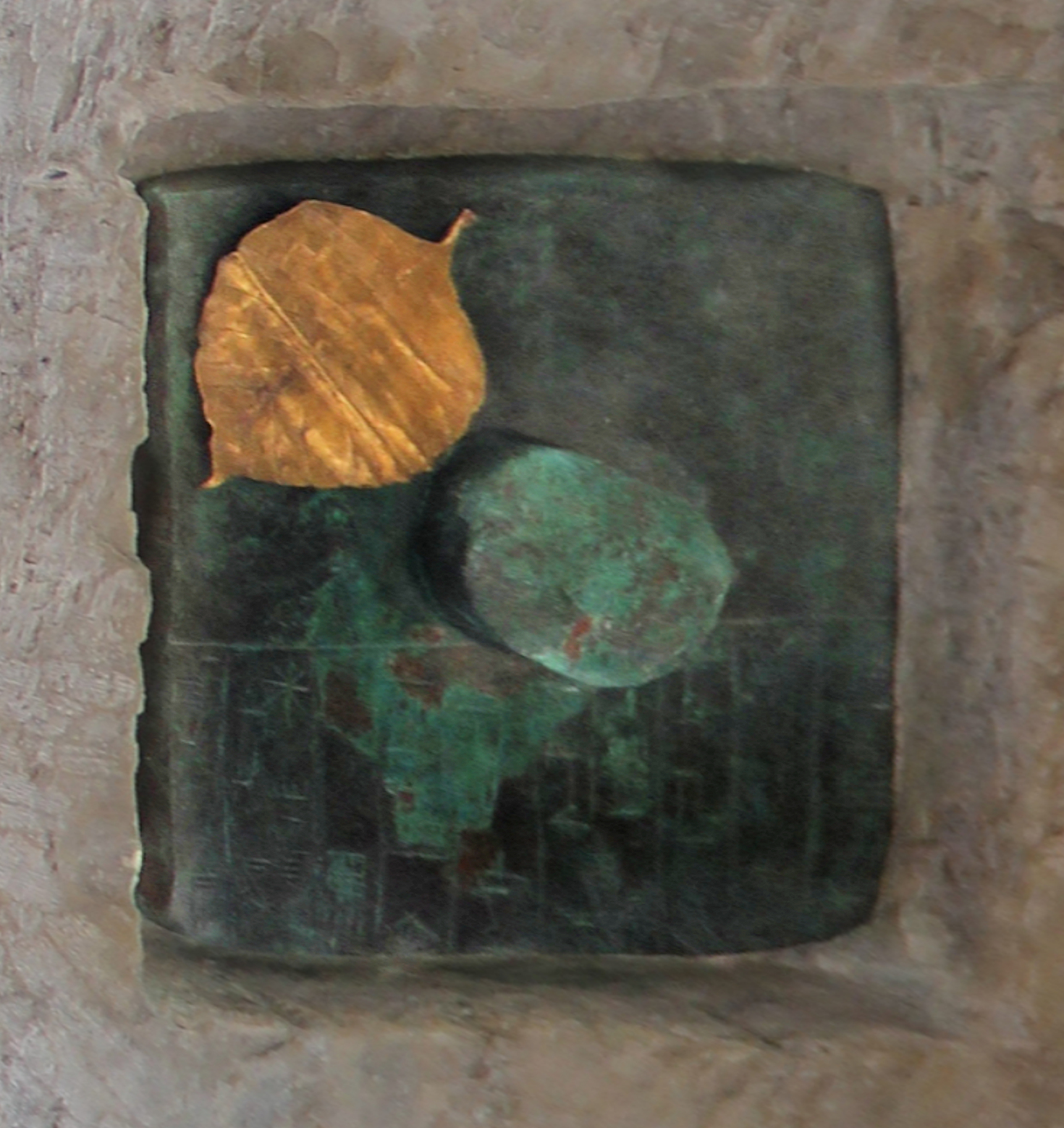
Ishtup-Ilum deposit for the Temple of Lions, Mari. Tablet inscription: "Ishtup-Ilum Shakkanakku of Mari, son of Ishma-Dagan, Shakkanakku of Mari, the Temple of the King of the Country he has built". Louvre Museum AO 19827

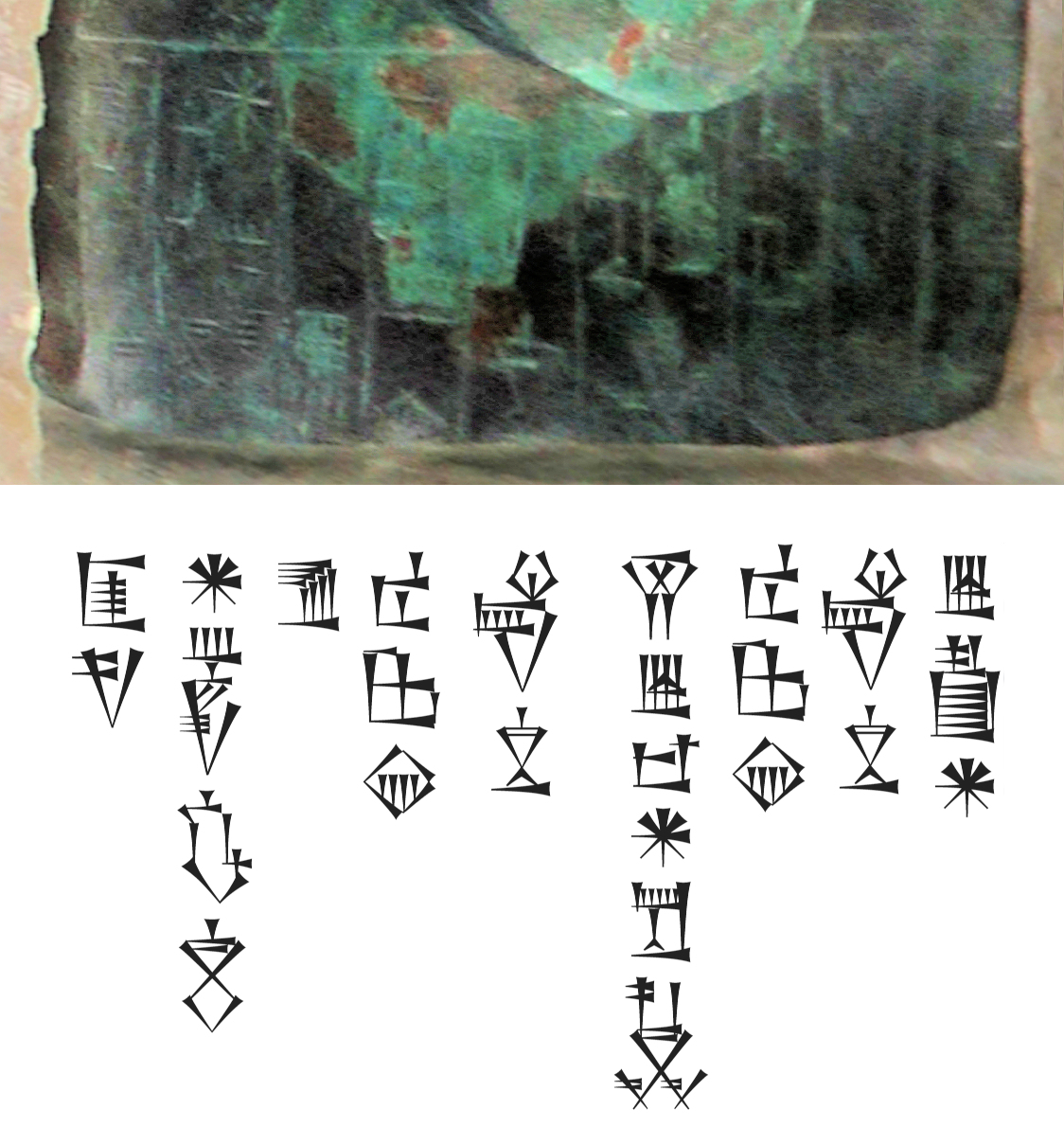
Ishtup-Ilum deposit for the Temple of Lions, Mari. Tablet inscription: "Ishtup-Ilum Shakkanakku of Mari, son of Ishma-Dagan, Shakkanakku of Mari, the Temple of the King of the Country he has built". Louvre Museum AO 19827

Ishtup-Ilum Mari
Regnal titles
Preceded by Nûr-Mêr	King of Mari c. 2148 - c. 2136 BC	Succeeded by Ishgum-Addu
