= Shakkanakku =

Title designating a military governor

Shakkanakku
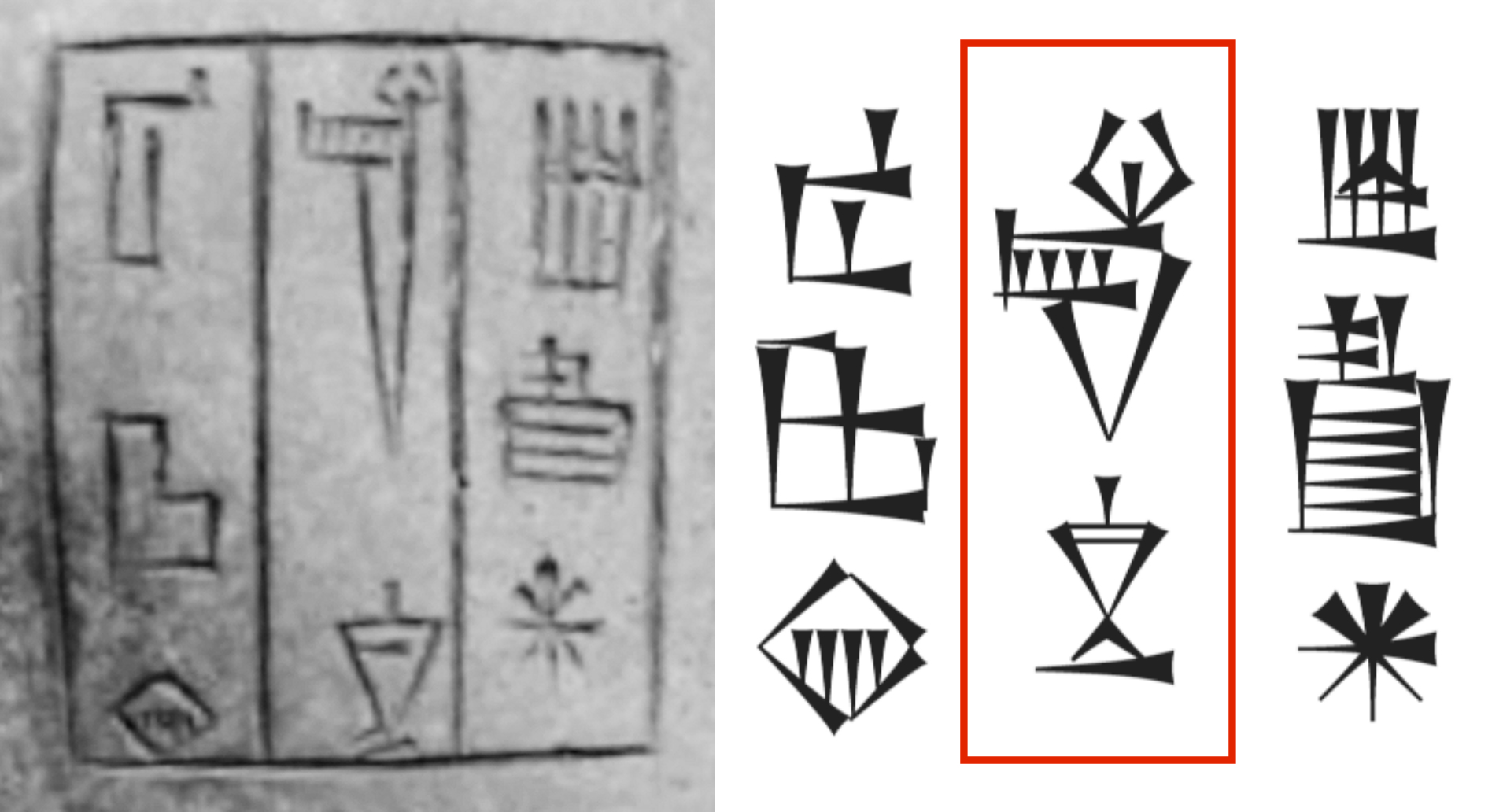
Inscription on the statue of Ishtup-Ilum with the word "Shakkanakku" (red): "Ishtup-Ilum, Shakkanakku of Mari" (𒅖𒁾𒀭 𒄊𒀴 𒈠𒌷𒆠)

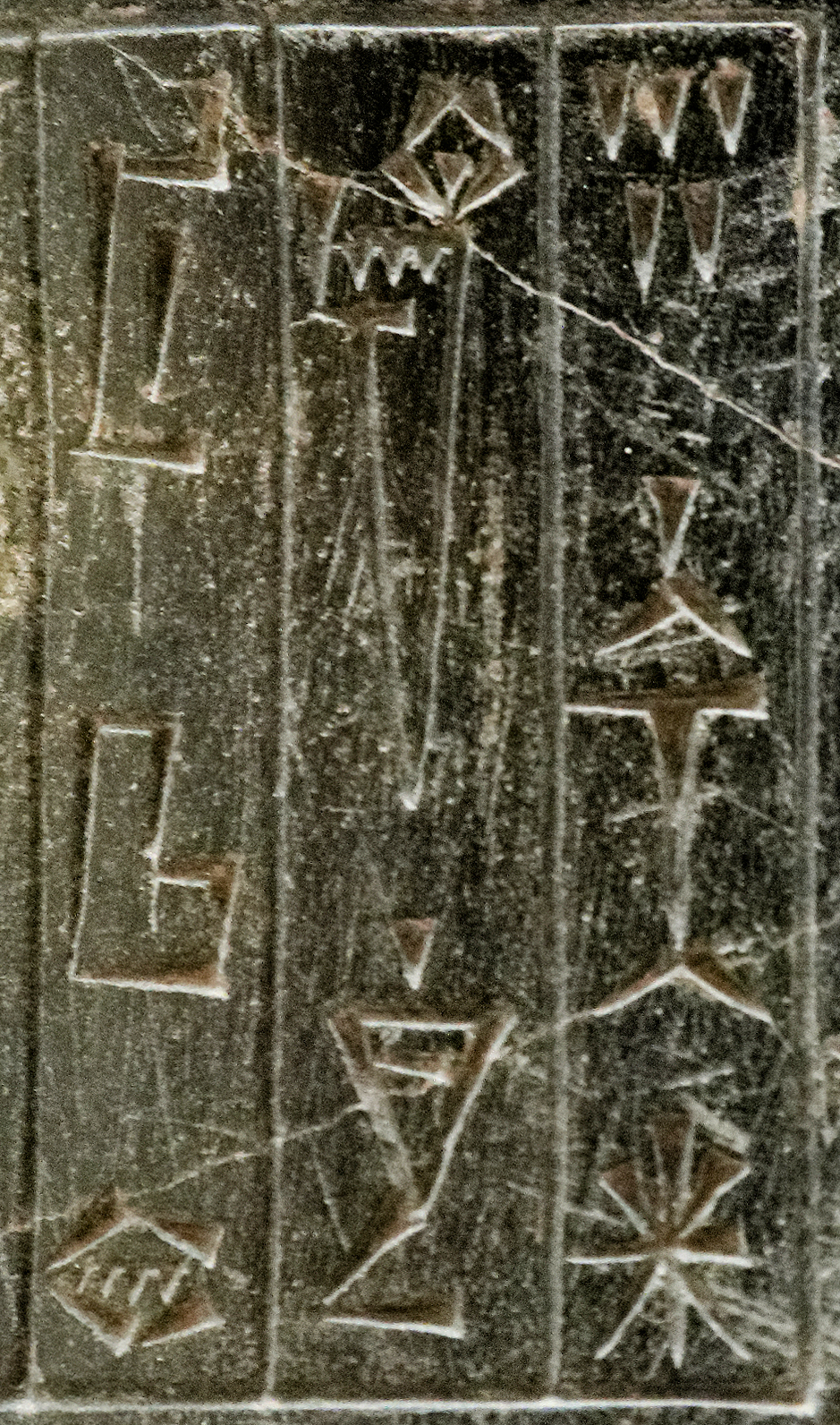
Inscription "Iddi-Ilum, shakkanakku of Mari", using the Sumerian: 𒄊𒀴, šagina, on the Statue of Iddi-Ilum.

Shakkanakku (Sumerian: 𒄊𒀴, GIR.NITA or šagina, Akkadian: 𒇽𒃻𒃶𒅘𒆪, šakkanakku), was an Akkadian-language title designating a military governor. Mari was ruled by a dynasty of hereditary Shakkanakkus which was originally set by the Akkadian Empire and gained independence following Akkad's collapse. It is considered that the Shakkanakkus gained some form of independence and came to be considered as "Kings" from the time of Apil-Kin. A critical analysis of the Shakkanakku List of Mari has been published.

The title is also known around the same time in Elam, where several "Shakkanakku (Military Governor) of the country of Elam" with typically Akkadian names ruled for the Akkadian kings.

The title also existed in Qatna in the 14th century BC, and Dilmun under the Kassites.

== Shakkanakkus under the Akkadians ==
Shakkanakkus, or Shagina military governors are known from the time of the Akkadian Empire. For example, Shar-kali-sharri had a military governor in Nippur taking charge of the construction of the temple of Enlil. One of his year names reads: "Year in which Szarkaliszarri appointed Puzur-Esztar the shagina (general) to build the temple of Enlil."

== Main Shakkanakkus of Mari ==
Several Shakkanakkus of Mari are known from archaeological artifacts:

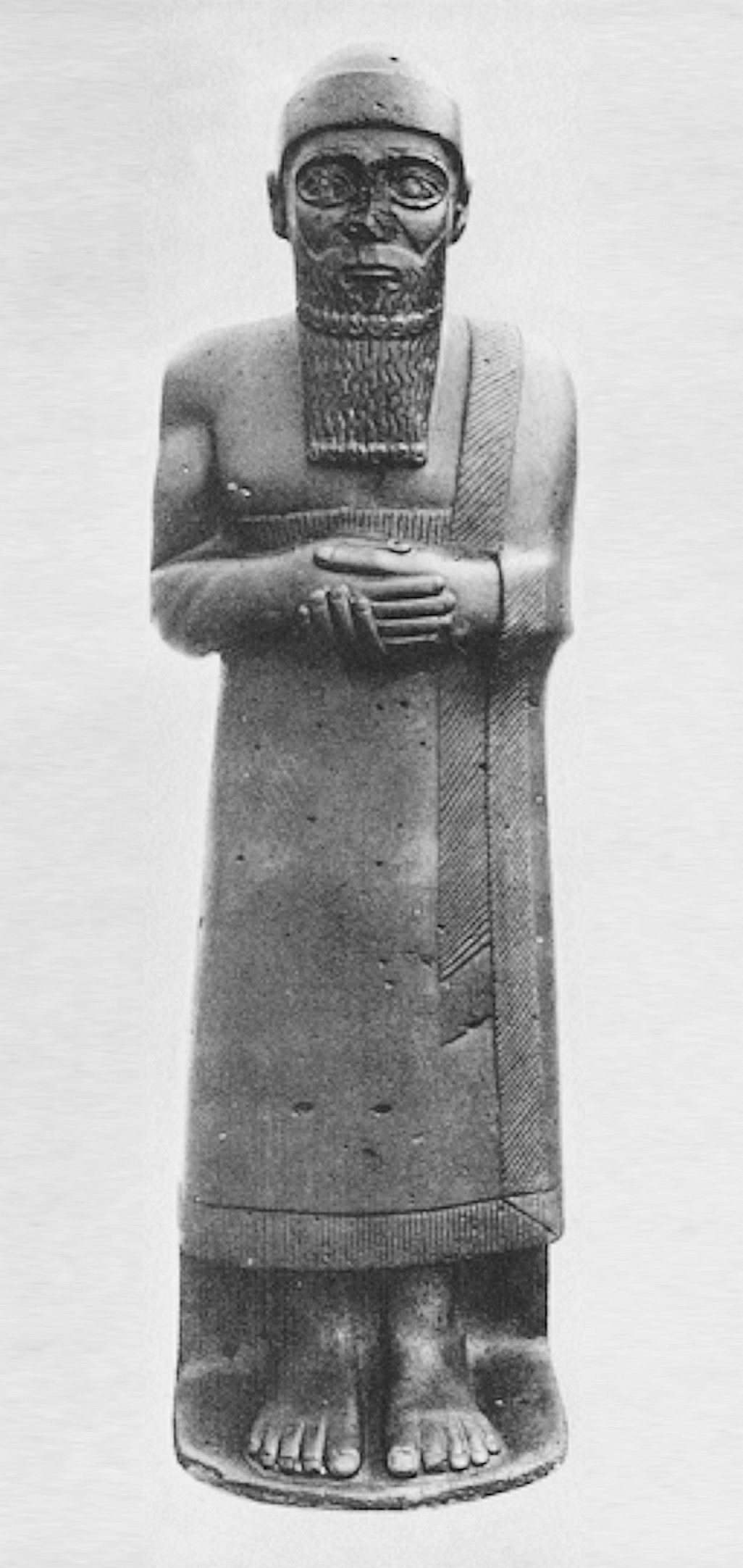
Statue of Ishtup-Ilum, Shakkanakku of Mari. (c.2150 BC)

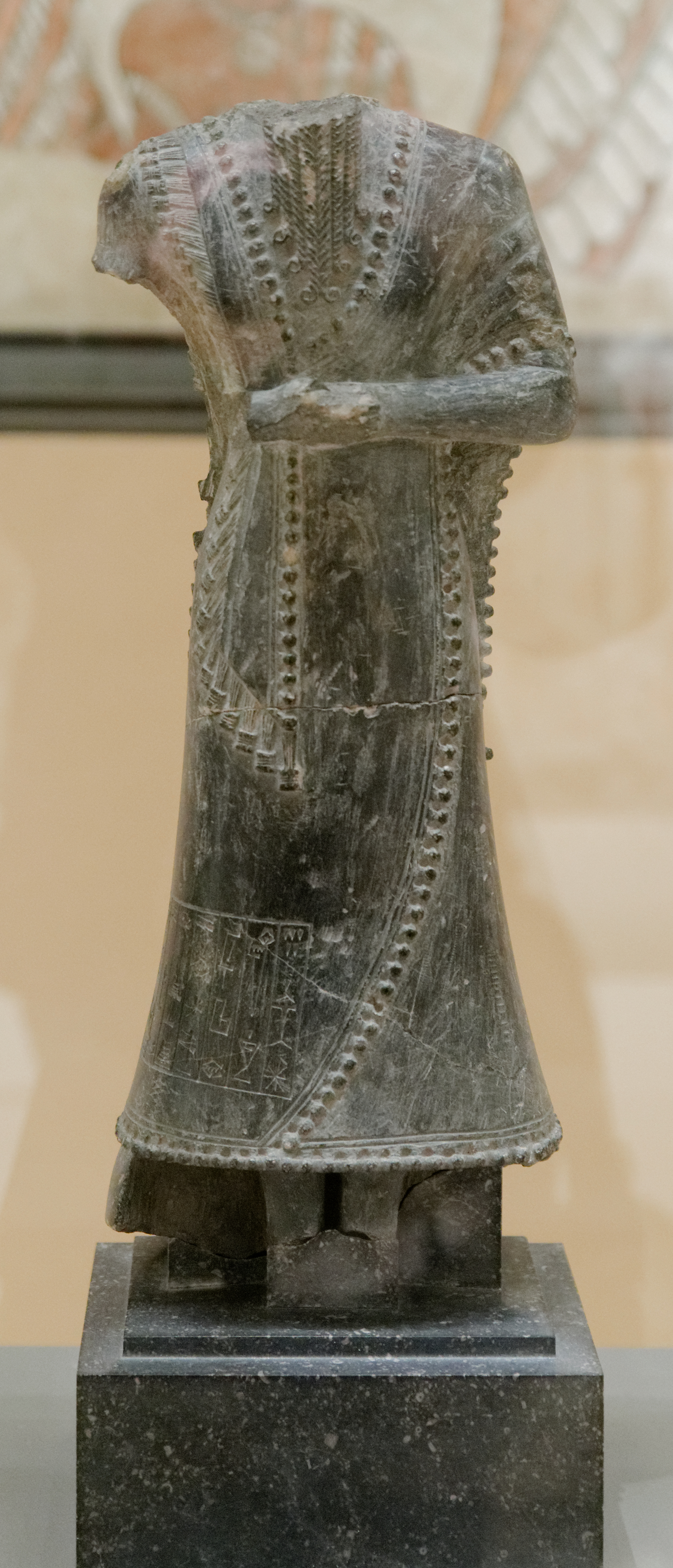
Statue of Iddi-Ilum, Shakkanakku of Mari. (c. 2090 BC)

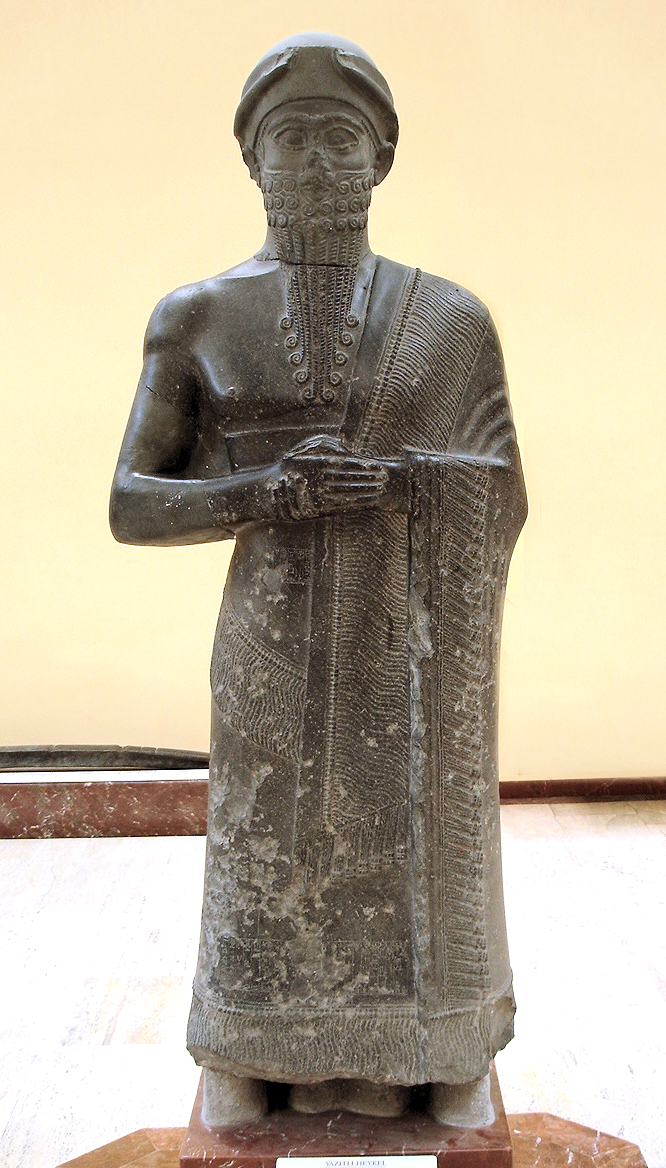
Puzur Ishtar, Shakkanakku of Mari. (c. 2050 BC)

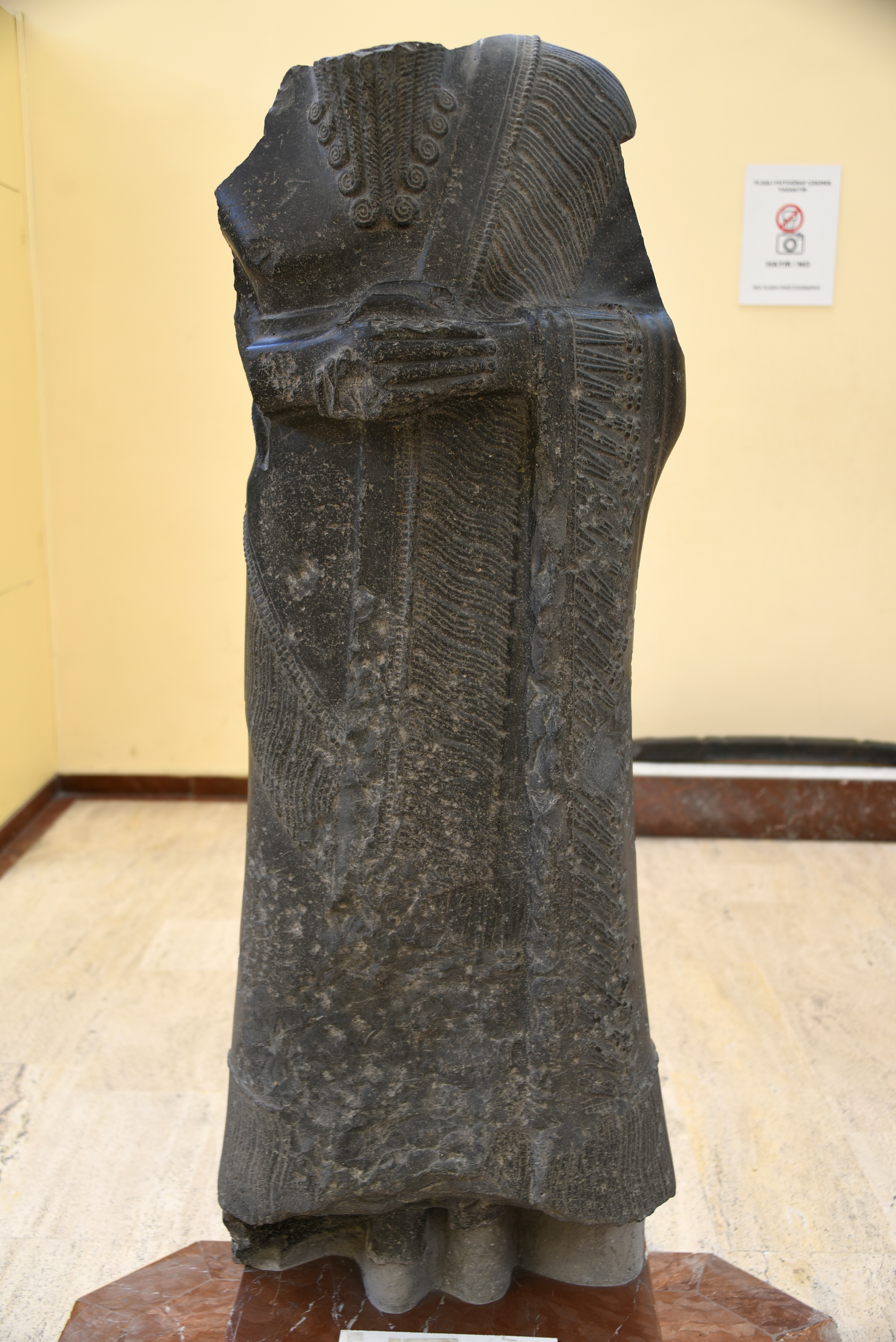
Tura-Dagan, Shakkanakku of Mari. Originally from Mari (c. 2071–2051 BC).

=== List of Shakkanakku rulers of Mari ===
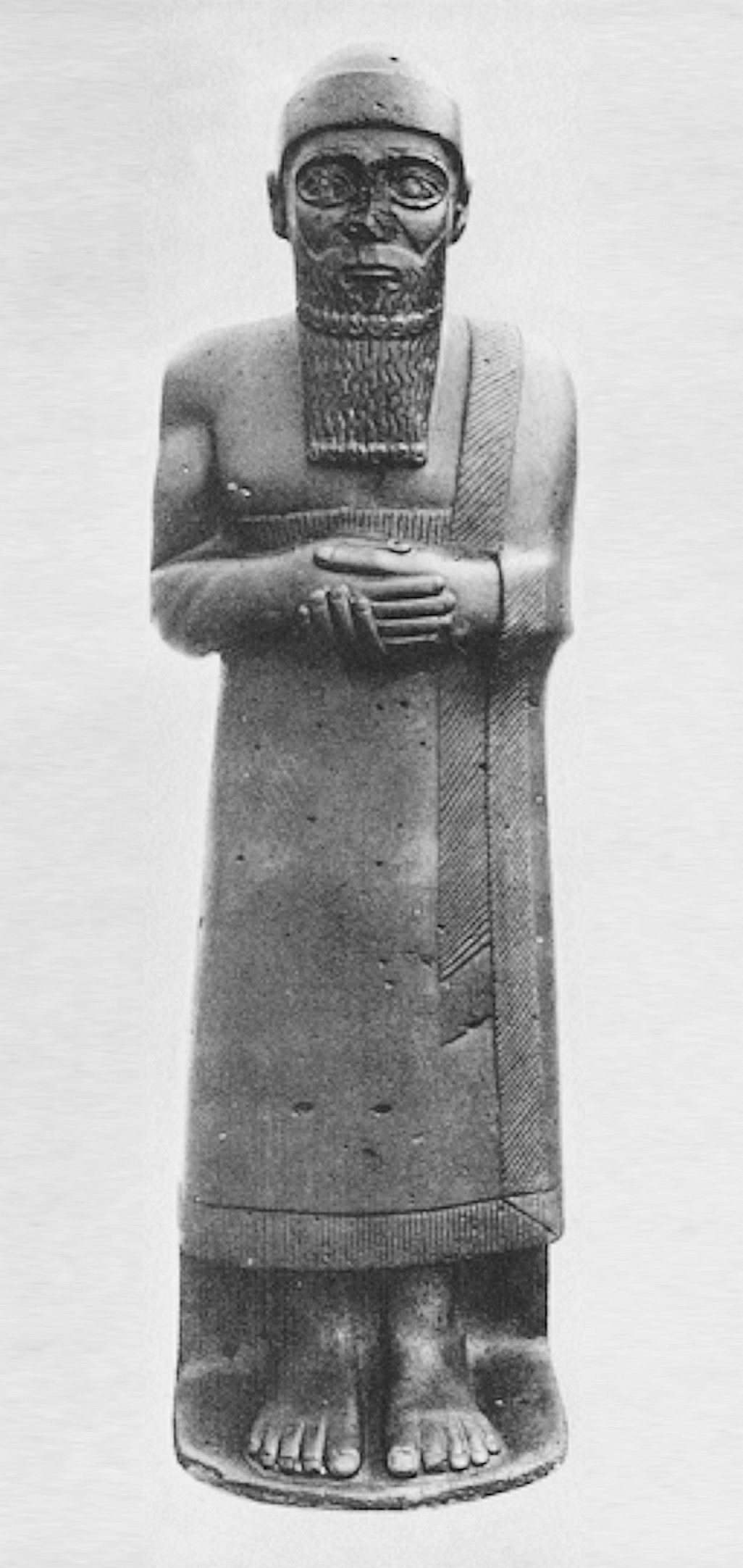
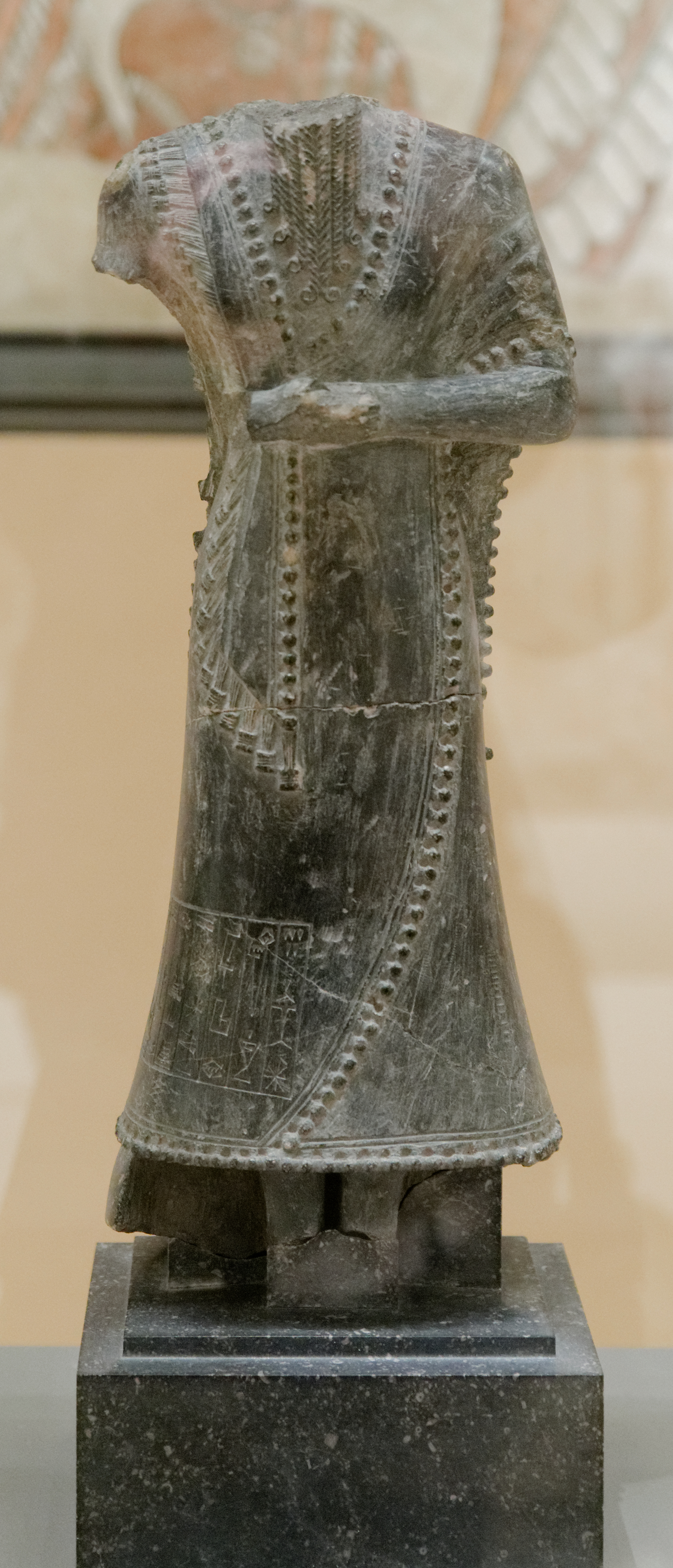
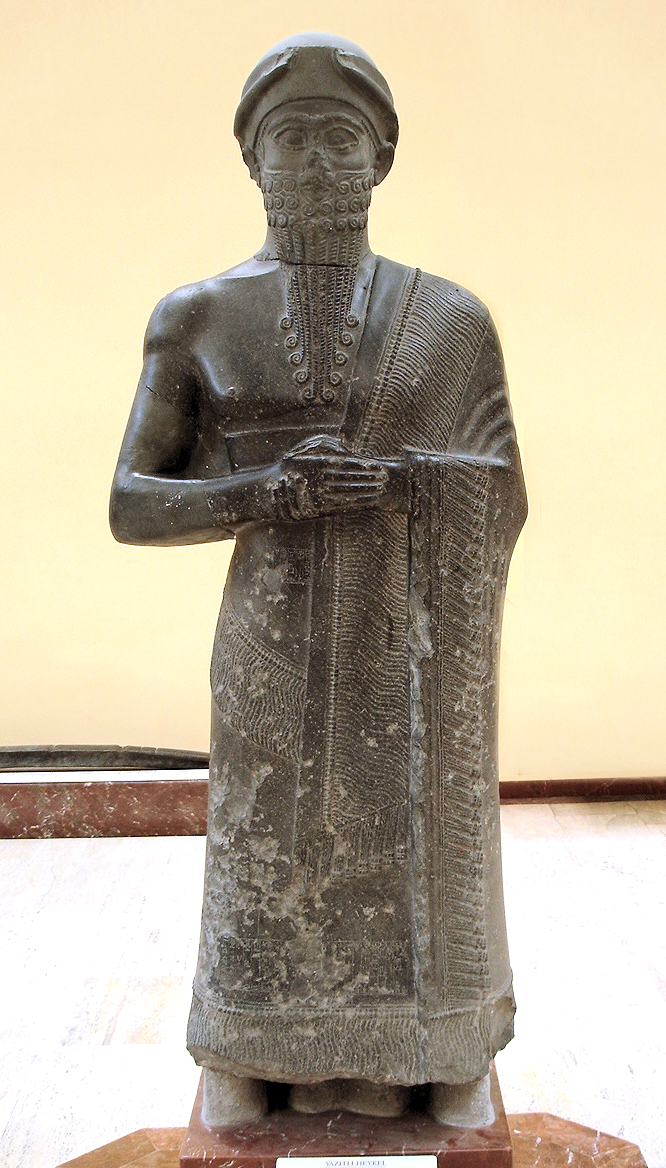
Ruler	Length of reign	Notes
Ididish	c. 2266–2206 BC
Shu-Dagan	c. 2206–2200 BC	He was the son of Ididish.
Ishma-Dagan	c. 2199–2154 BC	He ruled for 45 years.
Nûr-Mêr	c. 2153–2148 BC	He was the son of Ishme-Dagan.
Ishtup-Ilum	c. 2147–2136 BC	He was the son of Ishme-Dagan and the brother of Nûr-Mêr.
Ishgum-Addu	c. 2135–2127 BC	He reigned for eight years.
Apîl-kîn	c. 2126–2091 BC	He was the son of Ishme-Dagan. Was designated with the royal title Lugal in a votive inscription set by his daughter.
Iddi-ilum	c. 2090–2085 BC	His name is also read as Iddin-El; his name was inscribed on his votive statue.
Ili-Ishar	c. 2084–2072 BC	His name is inscribed on a brick.
Tura-Dagan	c. 2071–2051 BC	He was the son of Apîl-kîn and the brother of Ili-Ishar.
Puzur-Ishtar	c. 2050–2025 BC	He was the son of Turam-Dagan. Used the royal title.
Hitlal-Erra	c. 2024–2017 BC	He was the son of Puzur-Ishtar. Used the royal title.
Hanun-Dagan	c. 2016–2008 BC	He was the son of Puzur-Ishtar. Used the royal title.
Isi-Dagan	c. 2000 BC	This name is inscribed on a seal.
Ennin-Dagan		He was the son of Isi-Dagan.
Itur-(...)		This name is damaged, a gap separate him from Ennin-Dagan.
Amer-Nunu		This name is inscribed on a seal.
Tir-Dagan		He was the son of Itur-(...).
Dagan-(...)		This name is damaged and is the last attested Shakkanakku.

== Main Shakkanakkus of Elam ==
The title is also known around the same time in Elam, as in the inscription of the "Table au Lion", Puzur-Inshushinak appears as "Puzur-Inshushin(ak) Ensi (Governor) of Susa, Shakkanakku (Military Governor) of the country of Elam" (𒅤𒊭𒀭𒈹𒂞 𒑐𒋼𒋛 𒈹𒂞𒆠 𒄊𒀴 𒈣𒋾 𒉏𒆠 kutik-inshushinak ensi shushi^{ki} skakkanakku mati NIM^{ki}). A ruler with an Akkadian name, Ili-ishmani, at the time of Naram-Sin of Akkad or Shar-Kali-Sharri, also used the same title of "Skakkanakku of the country of Elam". This suggest that Ili-ishmani was a vassal of the Akkadian Empire.

=== List of the Shakkanakkus of Elam ===
Ruler	Length of reign	Notes
Eshpum	c. 2300 BC	He was a dependent of the Akkadian Empire ruler Manishtushu.
Ilshu-rabi	c. 2206–2200 BC	Shakkanakku in the Province of Parashime
Epirmupi	c. 2199–2154 BC
Ili-ishmani	c. 2200 BC	He was in charge of Elam at the time of Naram-Sin and/or Shar-Kali-Sharri, and probably their vassal.
Puzur-Inshushinak	c. 2150 BC	Shakkanakku, who gained independence from the Akkadians. He appears as "Puzur-Inshushin(ak) Ensi (Governor) of Susa, Shakkanakku (Military Governor) of the country of Elam".

== Sources ==
- Frayne, Douglas (1990). Old Babylonian Period (2003–1595 BC). The Royal Inscriptions of Mesopotamia Early Periods. Vol. 4. University of Toronto Press. ISBN 978-0-8020-5873-7.
- Gromova, Daria (2007). "Hittite Role In Political History of Syria In the Amarna Age Reconsidered". Ugarit-Forschungen. 39. Ugarit-Verlag. ISBN 978-3-86835-001-2. Archived from the original on 2022-02-24.
- Leick, Gwendolyn (2002). Who's Who in the Ancient Near East. Routledge. ISBN 978-1-134-78796-8.
- Michalowski, Piotr (1995). Van Lerberghe, Karel; Schoors, Antoon (eds.). Immigration and Emigration Within the Ancient Near East: Festschrift E. Lipiński. Orientalia Lovaniensia Analecta. Vol. 65. Peeters Publishers & Department of Oriental Studies, Leuven. ISBN 978-90-6831-727-5. ISSN 0777-978X.
- Oliva, Juan (2008). Textos Para Una Historia Política de Siria-Palestina I (in Spanish). Ediciones Akal. ISBN 978-84-460-1949-7.
