= Ornina =

Ur-Nanshe (also called Ornina) was a singer of Ishtar's temple in the kingdom of Mari.

== Statue ==
A seated statue was discovered in the temple to Ishtar in Mari, representative of a musician. The name given in the inscription is Ur-Nanshe, a masculine name. The statue's sex is unclear as the torso shows a female breast, though it could have even represented a castrato. The statue depicts Ur-Nanshe sitting on a decorated pillow wearing a fringed dress. Ur-Nanshe seems to have been an artist in the court of king Iblul-Il.

== Trophy ==
The Ornina trophy is given to the best musical performers during the Syrian Song Festival in Aleppo.
