= Ansud =

King of Mari
- Reign: c. 2423 – c. 2416 BC
- Predecessor: Possibly Ikun-Shamagan
- Successor: Possibly Saʿumu
- Died: c. 2416 BC

Ansud (also read as Ianupu, Yanup, Anubu, Gansud, Anusu and Hanusum; died c. 2416 BC), was an early king (Lugal) of the second Mariote kingdom. Ansud is known for warring against the Eblaites from a letter written by the later Mariote king Enna-Dagan.

== Reign ==
=== Identity ===
It has been proposed that a bead (reference M. 4439) discovered at Mari, was sent as a gift by Mesannepada of Ur to king "Hanusum" (Gansud) of Mari. This has now been corrected with new translations only giving Mesannepada as son of Meskalamdug:

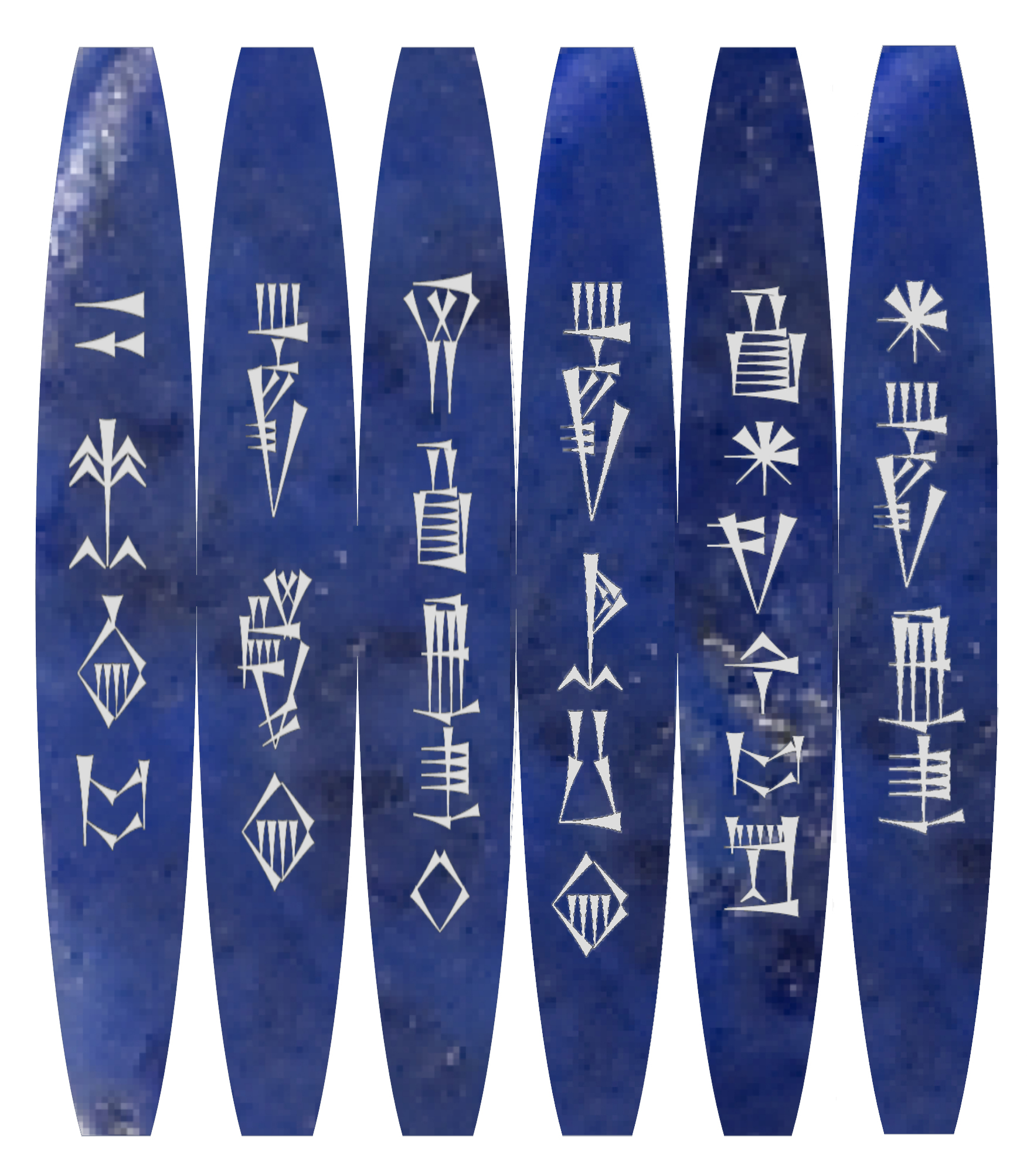
Mari bead

𒀭𒈗𒌦 𒈩𒀭𒉌𒅆𒊒𒁕 𒈗 𒋀𒀊𒆠 𒌉 𒈩𒌦𒄭 𒈗 𒆧𒆠 𒀀 𒈬𒈾𒊒

^{d}lugal-kalam mes-an-ne2-pa3-da lugal uri5^{ki} dumu mes-ug-du10 lugal kish^{ki} a munaru

"To god Lugalkalam ("the Lord of the Land", identified with Dagan or Enlil), Mesannepada, king of Ur, son of Meskalamdug, king of Kish, has consecrated this bead""

— Mesannepada Mari bead

It is unclear how this bead came to be in Mari, but this points to some kind of relation between Ur and Mari at that time. The bead was discovered in a jar containing other objects from Ur or Kish.

The letter of Enna-Dagan is extremely difficult to read, and the word "Sa'umu" appeared in three passages of it. In the second and third passages, the word referred to Ansud's successor Sa'umu. However, in the first passage, "Sa'umu" was read as a verb by Giovanni Pettinato, who later read it as (Anudu). Alfonso Archi, recognized that this verb is a personal name of a monarch and read it as Anubu (motivated by the Sumerian King List which record a dynasty of Mari and king Anbu as the first monarch of the dynasty). However, the discovery of an intact (SKL) with the names of Mari's dynasty bearing no resemblance to second kingdom monarchs, eliminated the need for Archi's identification. According to Michael Astour, the name is Anusu (Ansud) and must be correlated with king Hanusum.

=== Campaigns ===
In the letter Ansud is recorded defeating the cities of Aburu, Ilgi in the lands of Belan. (Note: Belan is located 26 km west of Raqqa.) The king is also mentioned leaving ruins in the mountains of Labanan, which were identified by Pettinato with Lebanon. However, this identification was ruled as geographically impossible by Astour.

King Ansud of Mari
Regnal titles
Preceded by Possibly Ikun-Shamagan	King of Mari c. 2423 - c. 2416 BC	Succeeded by Saʿumu

== See also ==
- Eblaite-Mariote war
