= Ishtup-Ishar =

Ishtup-Ishar 𒅖𒁾𒄿𒊬

King of Mari
- Reign: c. 2400 BC
- Predecessor: Possibly Saʿumu
- Successor: Possibly Iblul-Il

Ishtup-Ishar (Ištup-Išar) (fl. c. 2400 BC) was a king (Lugal) of the second Mariote kingdom. The king's name was traditionally read as Išhtup-šar, with šar being a common divine element in personal names attested in the region. However, the king's name is read as Ishtup-Ishar by Alfonso Archi, Ishar being an important justice deity worshiped in Mari and Ebla.

In a letter written by the later Mariote king Enna-Dagan, Ishar is attested conquering and destroying the Eblaite cities of Lalanium and Emar.

King Ishtup-Ishar of Mari
Regnal titles
Preceded by Possibly Saʿumu	King of Mari c. 2400 BC	Succeeded by Possibly Iblul-Il

== See also ==
- Eblaite-Mariote war
