= Mari, Syria =

Ancient Sumerian and Amorite city

Mari
- تل حريري (Arabic)
- Tell Hariri
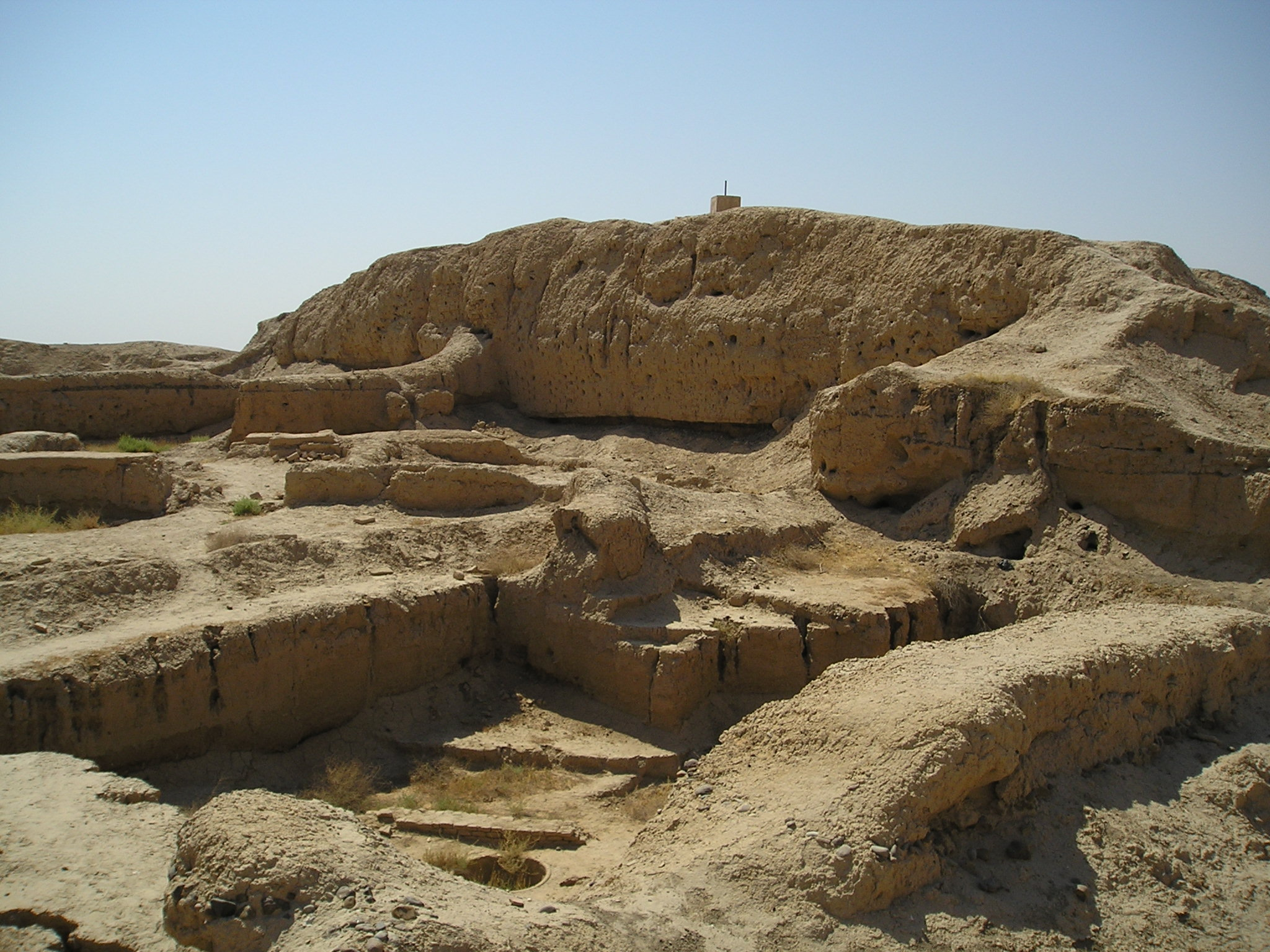
- Ruins of Mari

- Location within Syria
- 34°32′58″N 40°53′24″E
- Type: Settlement
- Periods: Bronze Age
- Cultures: East-Semitic (Kish civilization), Amorite
- Location: Abu Kamal, Deir ez-Zor Governorate, Syria

History
- Built: c. 2900 BC
- Abandoned: 3rd century BC

Site notes
- Area: 60 ha (150 acres)
- Archaeologists: André Parrot
- Condition: Ruined
- Owner: Public
- Public access: Yes

Mari (Cuneiform: 𒈠𒌷𒆠, ma-ri^{ki}, modern Tell Hariri; Arabic: تل حريري) was an ancient Semitic city-state in modern-day Syria. Its remains form a tell 11 kilometres (6.8 mi) north-west of Abu Kamal on the western bank of the Euphrates River, some 120 kilometres (75 mi) southeast of Deir ez-Zor. It flourished as a trade center and hegemonic state between 2900 BC and 1759 BC. (Note: Dates are estimated according to the Middle chronology unless otherwise stated.) The city was built in the middle of the Euphrates trade routes between Sumer in the south and the Eblaite kingdom and the Levant in the west.

Mari was first abandoned in the middle of the 26th century BC but was rebuilt and became the capital of a hegemonic East Semitic state before 2500 BC. This second Mari engaged in a long war with its rival Ebla and is known for its strong affinity with Sumerian culture. It was destroyed in the 23rd century BC by the Akkadians, who allowed the city to be rebuilt and appointed a military governor (Shakkanakku). The governors became independent with the disintegration of the Akkadian Empire, and rebuilt the city as a regional center of the Euphrates valley. The Shakkanakkus ruled Mari until the second half of the 19th century BC, when the dynasty collapsed for unknown reasons. A short time later, Mari became the capital of the Amorite Lim dynasty. The Amorite Mari lasted only a short time before it was destroyed by Babylonia in c. 1761 BC, but it survived as a small settlement under the rule of the Babylonians and the Assyrians before being abandoned and forgotten during the Hellenistic period.

The Mariotes worshiped both Semitic and Sumerian deities and established their city as a major trading center. Although the pre-Amorite periods were characterized by heavy Sumerian cultural influence, Mari was not a city of Sumerian immigrants but a Semitic-speaking nation with a dialect similar to Eblaite. The Amorites were West Semites who began to settle the area before the 21st century BC; by the Lim dynasty (c. 1830 BC), they became the dominant population in the Fertile Crescent.

Mari's discovery in 1933 provided an important insight into the geopolitical map of ancient Mesopotamia and Syria, due to the discovery of more than 25,000 tablets explicating the state administration in the 2nd millennium BC and the nature of diplomatic relations among the political powers of the region. They also revealed the wide trading networks of the 18th century BC, which connected areas as far as Afghanistan in Southern Asia and Crete in the Mediterranean.

Based on remote sensing, between 2011 and 2022 the site was subject to extensive looting and is now pockmarked by looting holes.

== Name ==
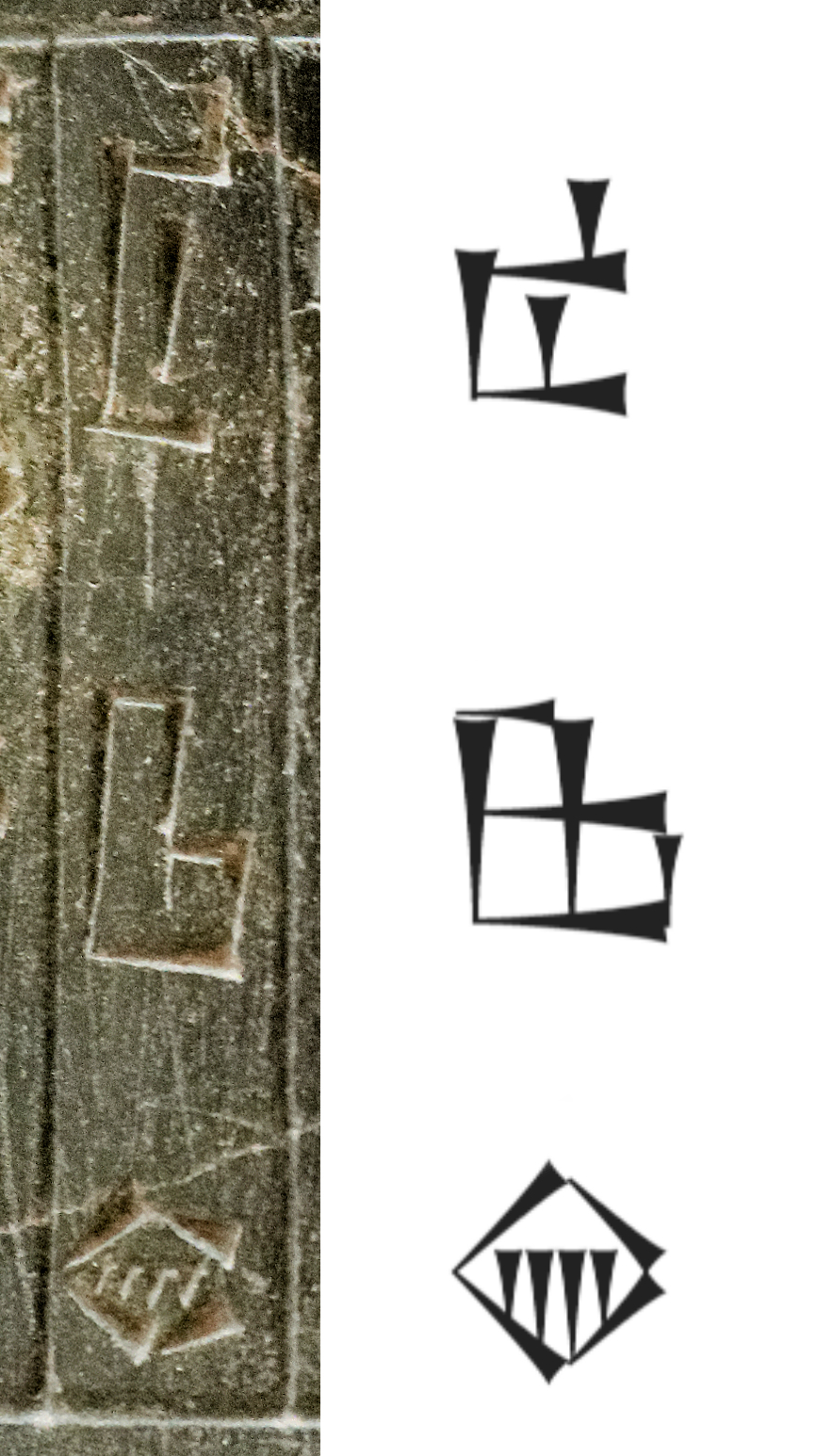
The name of Mari (Cuneiform: 𒈠𒌷𒆠, ma-ri^{ki}), on the statue of Iddi-Ilum, c. 2090 BC

Written in Cuneiform 𒈠𒌷𒆠 (ma-ri^{ki}), the name of the city can be traced to Itūr-Mēr, an ancient storm deity of northern Mesopotamia and Syria, who was considered the tutelary deity of the city, Georges Dossin noted that the name of the city was spelled identically to that of the storm god and concluded that Mari was named after him.

== History ==
=== Early Bronze Age ===
==== First kingdom ====
Evidence shows that Mari was founded as a new city in c. 2900 BC during the Mesopotamian Early Dynastic period I, established to control the waterways of the Euphrates trade routes connecting the Levant with the Sumerian south. The city was built about 1 to 2 kilometres (0.62 to 1.24 mi) from the Euphrates river to protect it from floods, and was connected to the river by an artificial canal 7 to 10 kilometres (4.3 to 6.2 mi) long, the route of which has not been identified.

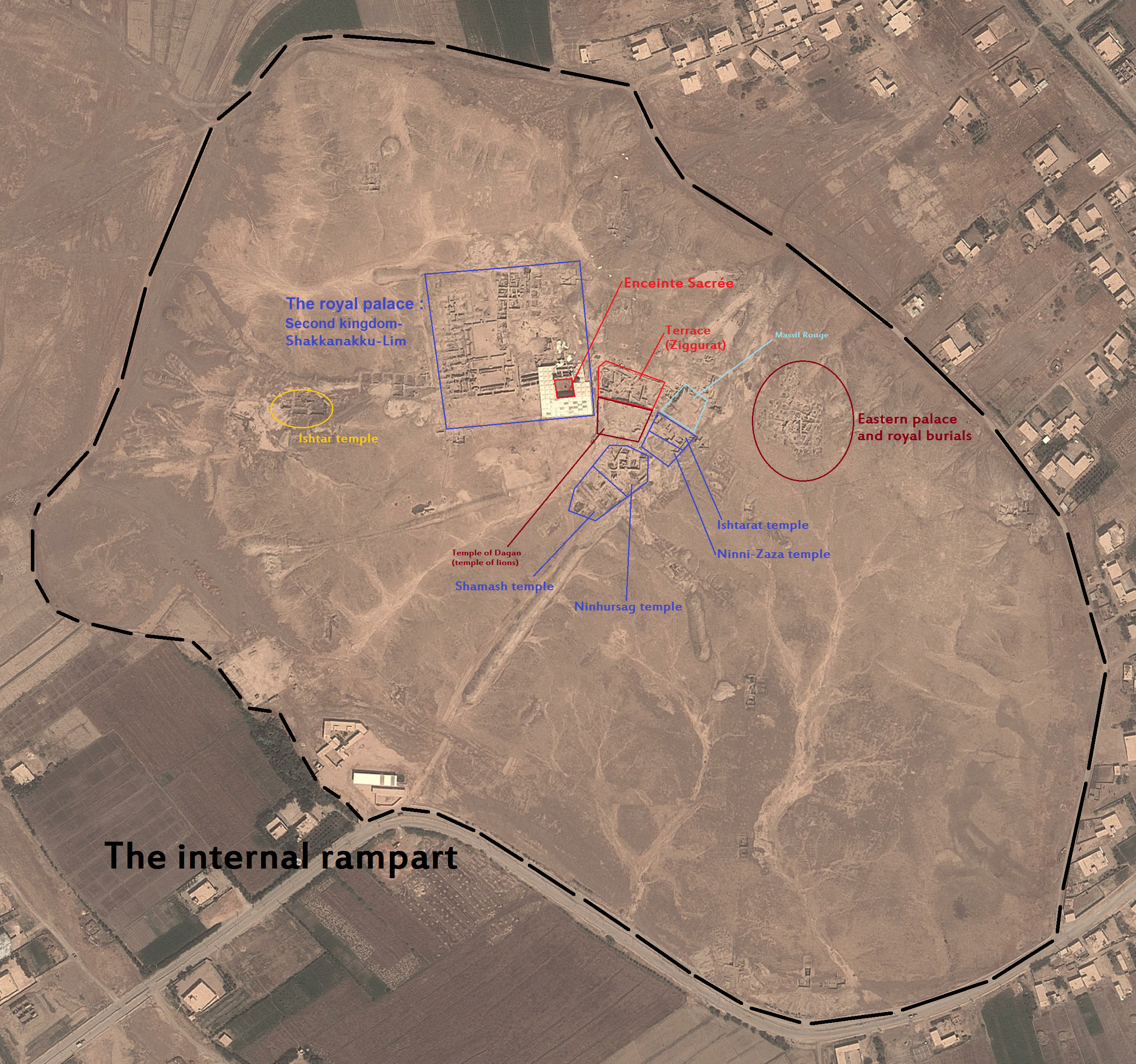
Mari's landmarks

The Mari site, referred to by archaeologists as "City I" (Ville I) for this period, is difficult to excavate as it is buried deep under later layers of habitation. A circular flood embankment was unearthed, containing an area 300 metres (980 ft) in length for gardens and craftsmen's quarters, and a defensive circular internal rampart 6.7 m (22 ft) thick and 8 to 10 metres (26 to 33 ft) high, strengthened by defensive towers. Other findings include one of the city gates, a street beginning at the center and ending at the gate, and residential houses. Mari had a central mound, but no temple or palace has been unearthed there. A large building was however excavated (with dimensions of 32 m x 25 m), seemingly with an administrative function. It had stone foundations and rooms up to 12 metres (39 ft) long and 6 metres (20 ft) wide. The city was abandoned c. 2550 BC at the end of the Early Dynastic period II, for unknown reasons.

==== Second kingdom ====
Mari on the map of Ancient Orient around 2400 BCE. Conflict between Ebla and Mari.

Near the beginning of Early Dynastic period III, before 2500 BC, Mari was rebuilt and populated again. It is referred to by archaeologists as "City II" (Ville II) for this period. The new city kept many of the first city's exterior features, including the internal rampart and gate. Also kept was the outer circular embankment measuring 1.9 km (1.2 mi) in diameter, which was topped by a wall two meters thick capable of protecting archers.

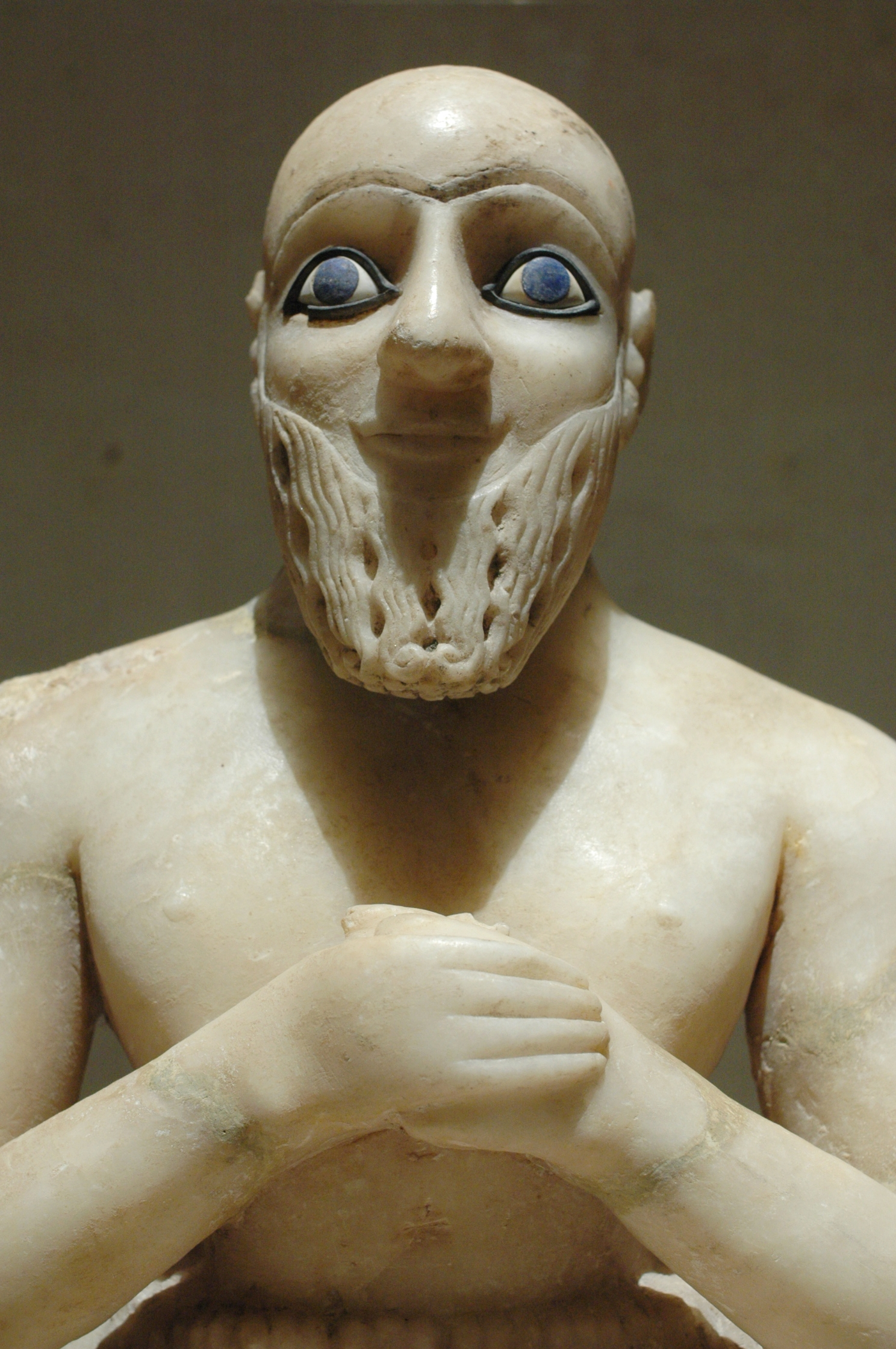
Statue of Ebih-Il, a superintendent in Mari. (25th century BC)

The new Mari was carefully planned. Its internal urban structure was radically different from the preceding incarnation. First to be built were the streets that descended from the elevated center into the gates which ensured the drainage of rainwater.

A structure known as the Royal Palace of Mari was built in the heart of the city; the palace also served as a temple. Four successive architectural levels from the second kingdom's palace have been unearthed (the oldest is designated P3, while the latest is P0). The last two levels are dated to the Akkadian period of Sumer. The first two levels were excavated; the findings include a temple dubbed the Enceinte Sacrée (sacred enclosure) dedicated to an unknown deity, a columned throne room, and a hall with three double wood pillars leading to the temple.

Six smaller temples were also discovered, including the temple called the Massif Rouge (also dedicated to an unknown deity), and temples dedicated to Ninni-Zaza (INANA.ZA.ZA), Ishtarat, Ishtar, Ninhursag, and Shamash. All the temples except that of Ishtar were located in the center of the city; the area between the Enceinte Sacrée and the Massif Rouge is thought to be the administrative center of the high priest.

The second kingdom appears to have been a powerful and prosperous political center, its kings held the title of Lugal, and many are attested in the city, the most important source being the letter of king Enna-Dagan c. 2350 BC, (Note: In old readings, it was thought that Enna-Dagan was a general of Ebla. However, the deciphering of Ebla's tablets showed him in Mari and receiving gifts from Ebla during the reigns of his Mariote predecessors.) which was sent to Irkab-Damu of Ebla, (Note: Irkab-Damu is not named in the letter but it is almost certain that he was the recipient.). In it, the Mariote king mentions his predecessors and their military achievements. However, the reading of this letter is still uncertain and many interpretations have been presented by scholars.

===== Mari–Ebla war =====
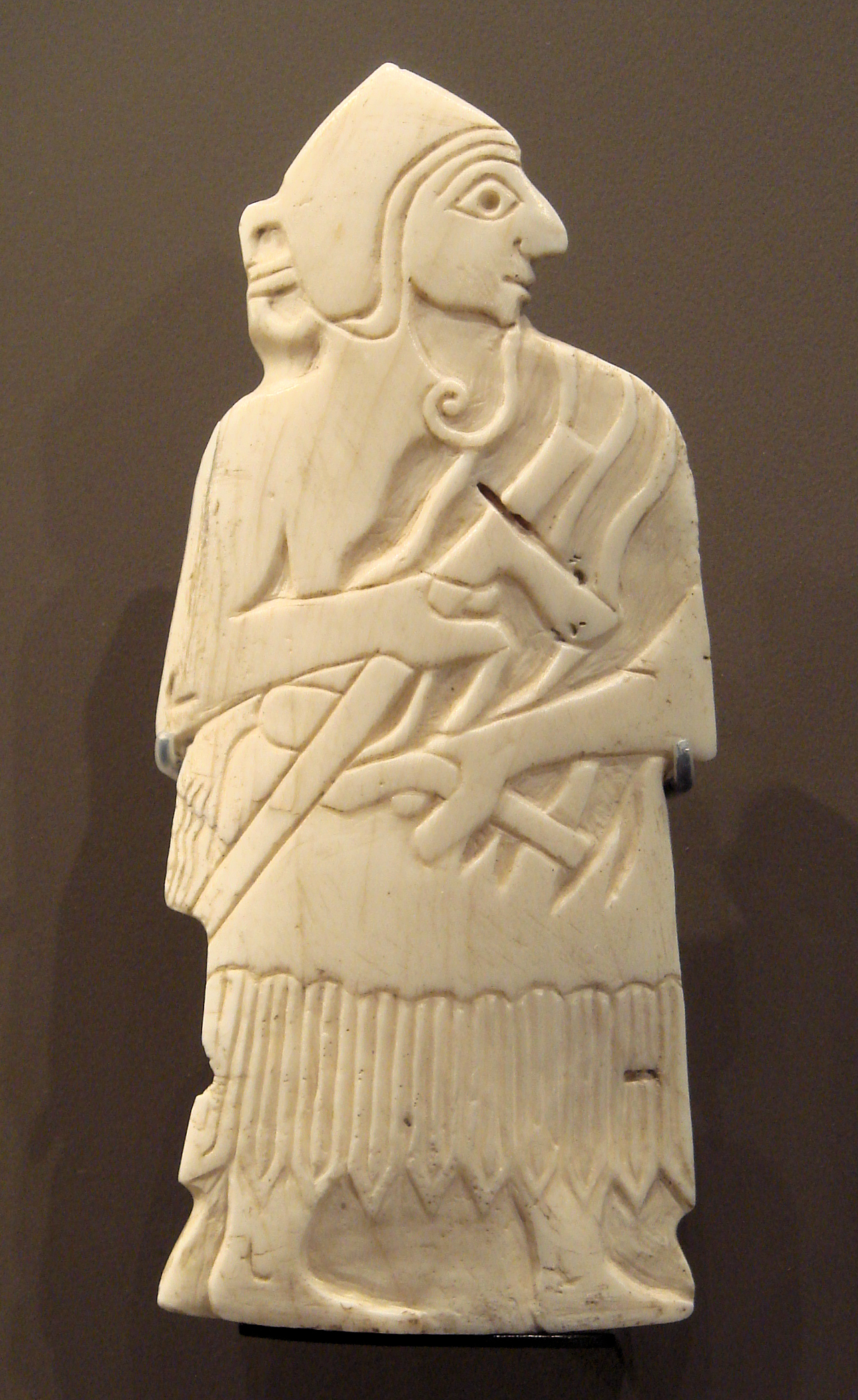
Helmetted warrior with axe, Mari

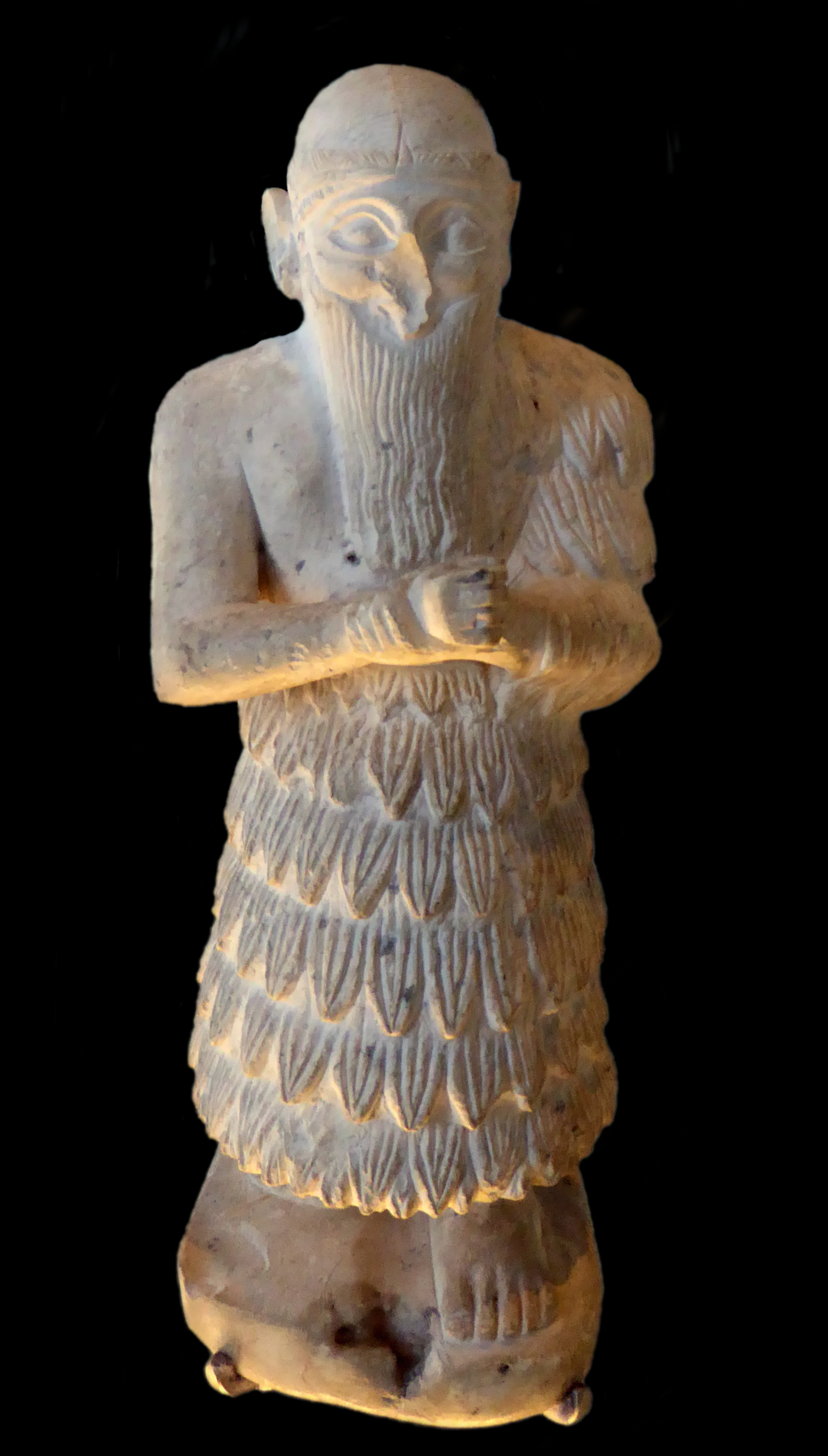
Ishqi-Mari, king of the Second Kingdom of Mari, circa 2300 BC

The earliest attested king in the letter of Enna-Dagan is Ansud, who is mentioned as attacking Ebla, the traditional rival of Mari with whom it had a long war, and conquering many of Ebla's cities, including the land of Belan. (Note: Located 26 km west of Raqqa.) The next king mentioned in the letter is Saʿumu, who conquered the lands of Ra'ak and Nirum. (Note: Located in the Euphrates middle valley close to Sweyhat.) King Kun-Damu of Ebla defeated Mari in the middle of the 25th century BC. The war continued with Išhtup-Išar of Mari's conquest of Emar at a time of Eblaite weakness in the mid-24th century BC. King Igrish-Halam of Ebla had to pay tribute to Iblul-Il of Mari, who is mentioned in the letter, conquering many of Ebla's cities and campaigning in the Burman region.

Enna-Dagan also received tribute; his reign fell entirely within the reign of Irkab-Damu of Ebla, who managed to defeat Mari and end the tribute. Mari defeated Ebla's ally Nagar in year seven of the Eblaite vizier Ibrium's term, causing the blockage of trade routes between Ebla and southern Mesopotamia through upper Mesopotamia. The war reached a climax when the Eblaite vizier Ibbi-Sipish made an alliance with Nagar and Kish to defeat Mari in a battle near Terqa. Ebla itself suffered its first destruction a few years after Terqa in c. 2300 BC, during the reign of the Mariote king Hidar. According to Alfonso Archi, Hidar was succeeded by Ishqi-Mari whose royal seal was discovered. It depicts battle scenes, causing Archi to suggest that he was responsible for the destruction of Ebla while still a general.

===== Destruction of Mari by Sargon of Akkad =====
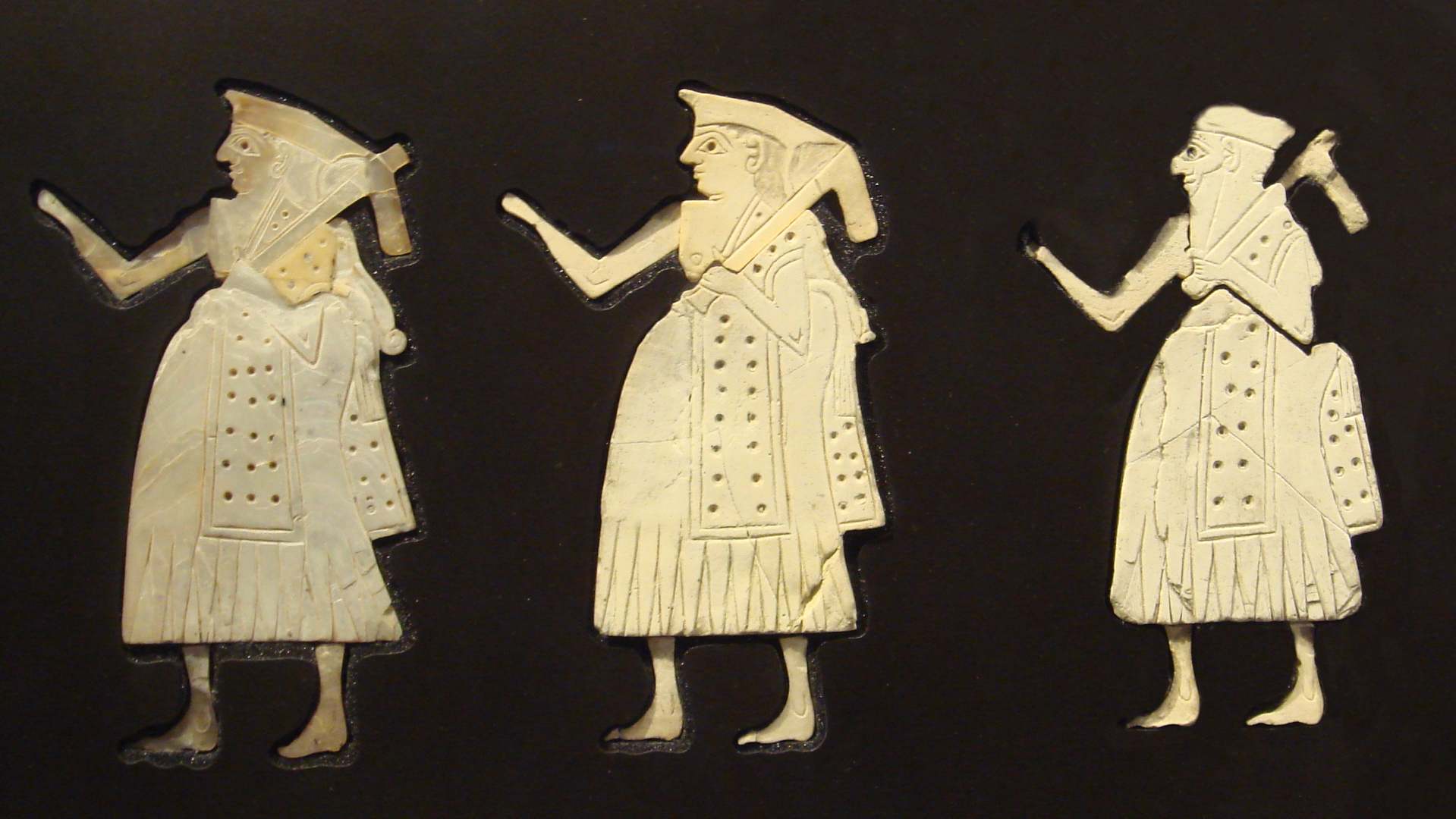
Soldiers, shell inlay. Mari

Just a decade after Ebla's destruction (c. 2300 BC middle chronology), Mari itself was destroyed and burned by Sargon of Akkad, as shown by one of his year names ("Year in which Mari was destroyed"). Michael Astour proposed the date as c. 2265 BC (short chronology). Ishqi-Mari was probably the last king of Mari before the conquests by the Akkadian Empire. Sargon of Akkad collected tribute from Mari and Elam:

Sargon the King bowed down to Dagan in Tuttul. He (Dagan) gave to him (Sargon) the Upper Land: Mari, Iarmuti, and Ebla, as far as the Cedar Forest and the Silver Mountains

— Nippur inscription of Sargon

==== Third kingdom ====
Mari was deserted for two generations before being restored by the Akkadian king Manishtushu. A governor was appointed to govern the city who held the title Shakkanakku (military governor). Akkad kept direct control over the city, which is evident by Naram-Sin of Akkad's appointment of two of his daughters to priestly offices in the city. Archaeologists refer to the strata corresponding to this period, up until the destruction of the city, as "City III."

===== Shakkanakku dynasty =====
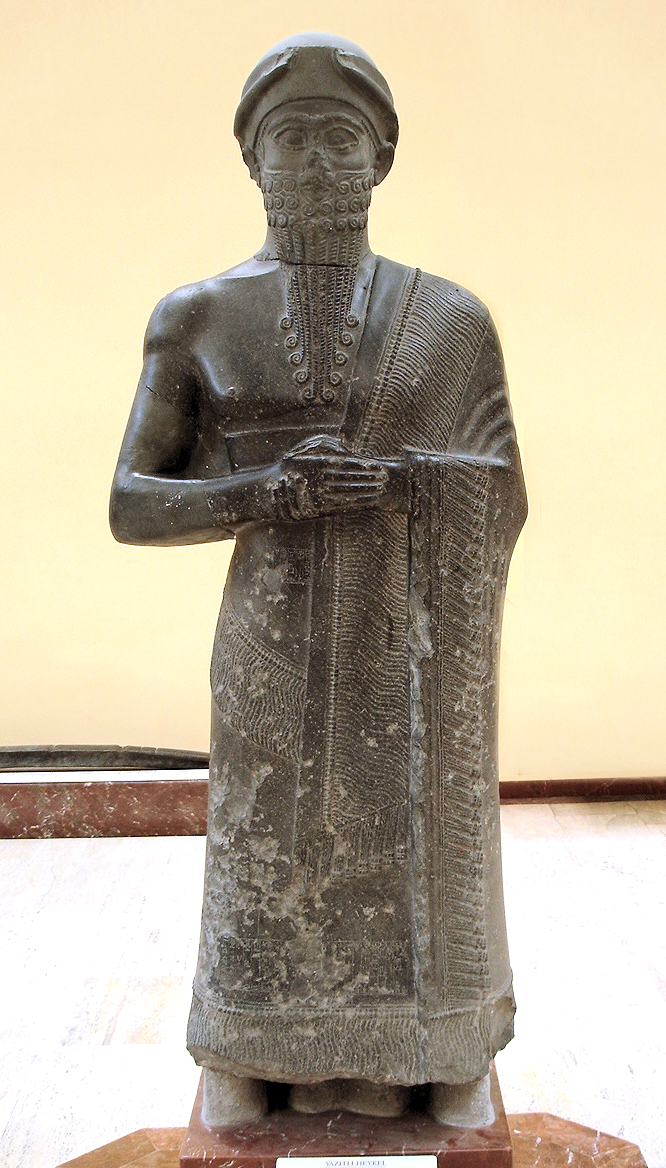
Puzur-Ishtar, Shakkanakku (Military Governor) of Mari, circa 2050 BC

In the Akkadian period, the first member of the Shakkanakku dynasty on the lists is Ididish, who was appointed in c. 2266 BC. (Note: According to Jean-Marie Durand, this Shakkanakku was appointed by Manishtushu, other opinions consider Naram-Sin as the appointer of Ididish.) According to the lists, Ididish ruled for 60 years and was succeeded by his son=, making the position hereditary.

The layout of the third Mari was similar to that of its predecessor; phase P0 of the old royal palace was replaced by a new palace for the Shakkanakku. Another smaller palace was built in the eastern part of the city housing royal burials that date to the former periods. The ramparts were rebuilt and strengthened while the embankment was turned into a defensive wall that reached 10 metres (33 ft) in width. The former sacred enclosure was maintained, so was the temple of Ninhursag. However, the temples of Ninni-Zaza and Ishtarat disappeared, while a new temple called the "temple of lions" (dedicated to Dagan), was built by the Shakkanakku Ishtup-Ilum and attached to it, was a rectangular terrace that measured 40 by 20 metres (131 ft × 66 ft) for sacrifices.

Akkad disintegrated during Shar-Kali-Sharri's reign, and Mari gained its independence, but the use of the Shakkanakku title continued during the following Third Dynasty of Ur period. A princess of Mari married the son of king Ur-Nammu of Ur, and Mari was nominally under Ur hegemony. However, the vassalage did not impede the independence of Mari, and some Shakkanakkus used the royal title Lugal in their votive inscriptions, while using the title of Shakkanakku in their correspondence with the Ur's court. The dynasty ended for unknown reasons not long before the establishment of the next dynasty, which took place in the second half of the 19th century BC.

=== Middle Bronze Age ===
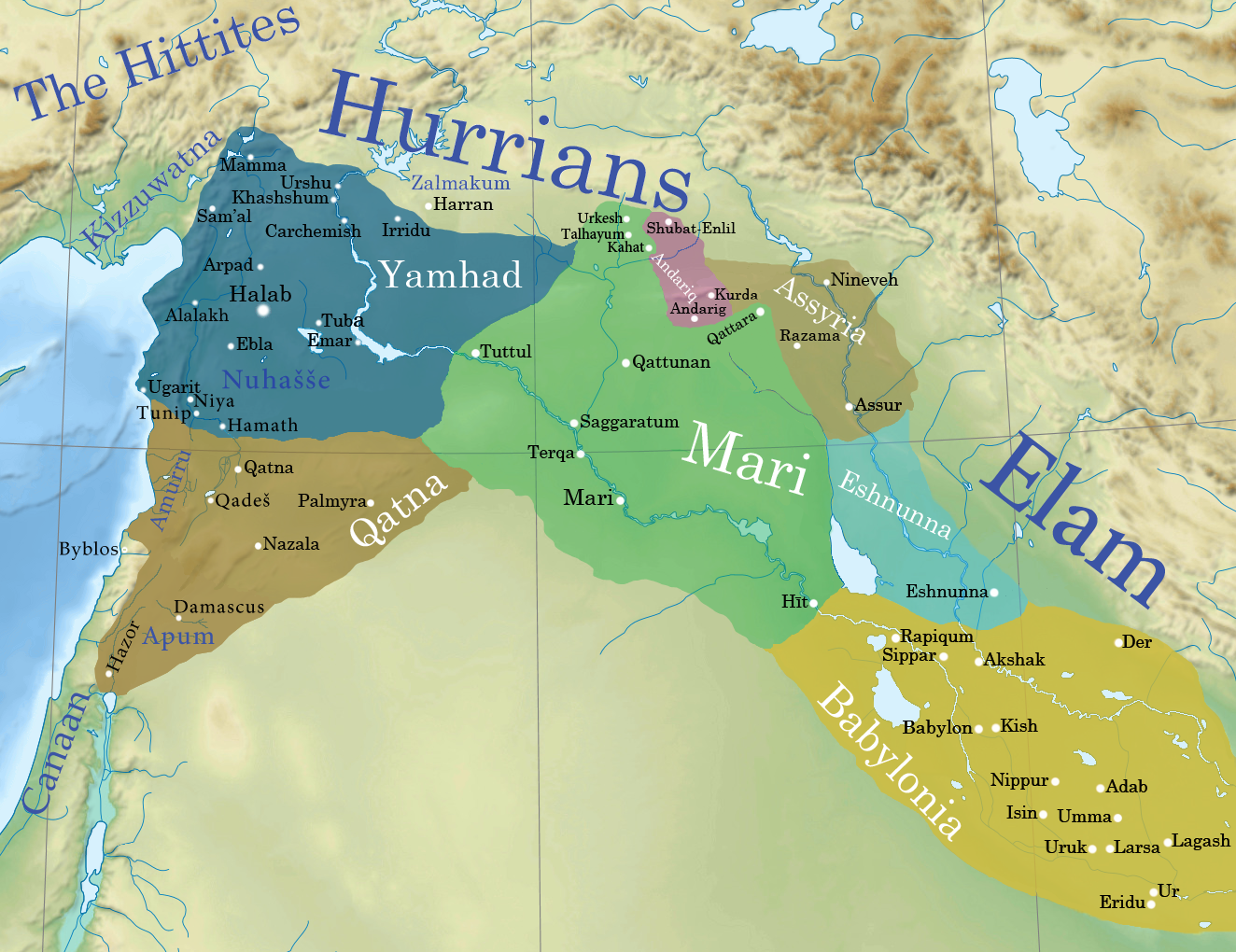
Mari at its height in the eighteenth century BC

==== Lim dynasty ====
The second millennium BC in the Fertile Crescent was characterized by the expansion of the Amorites, which culminated with them dominating and ruling most of the region, including Mari which in c. 1830 BC, became the seat of the Amorite Lim dynasty under king Yaggid-Lim. However, the epigraphical and archaeological evidences showed a high degree of continuity between the Shakkanakku and the Amorite eras. (Note: This ruled out the former theory that there was an abandonment of Mari during the transition period.)

Yaggid-Lim was the ruler of Suprum before establishing himself in Mari, (Note: Suprum is 12 kilometers upstream from Mari, perhaps the modern Tel Abu Hasan.) (Note: It is not certain that Yaggid-Lim controlled Mari, however he is traditionally considered the first king of the dynasty.) he entered an alliance with Ila-kabkabu of Ekallatum, but the relations between the two monarchs changed to an open war. The conflict ended with Ila-kabkabu capturing Yaggid-Lim's heir Yahdun-Lim and according to a tablet found in Mari, Yaggid-Lim who survived Ila-kabkabu was killed by his servants. (Note: The credibility of the tablet is doubted as it was written by Yasmah-Adad who was Ila-kabkabu grandson.) However, in c. 1820 BC Yahdun-Lim was firmly in control as king of Mari. (Note: The transition of the Lim family from Suprum to Mari could have been the work of Yahdun-Lim after the war with Ila-kabkabu.)

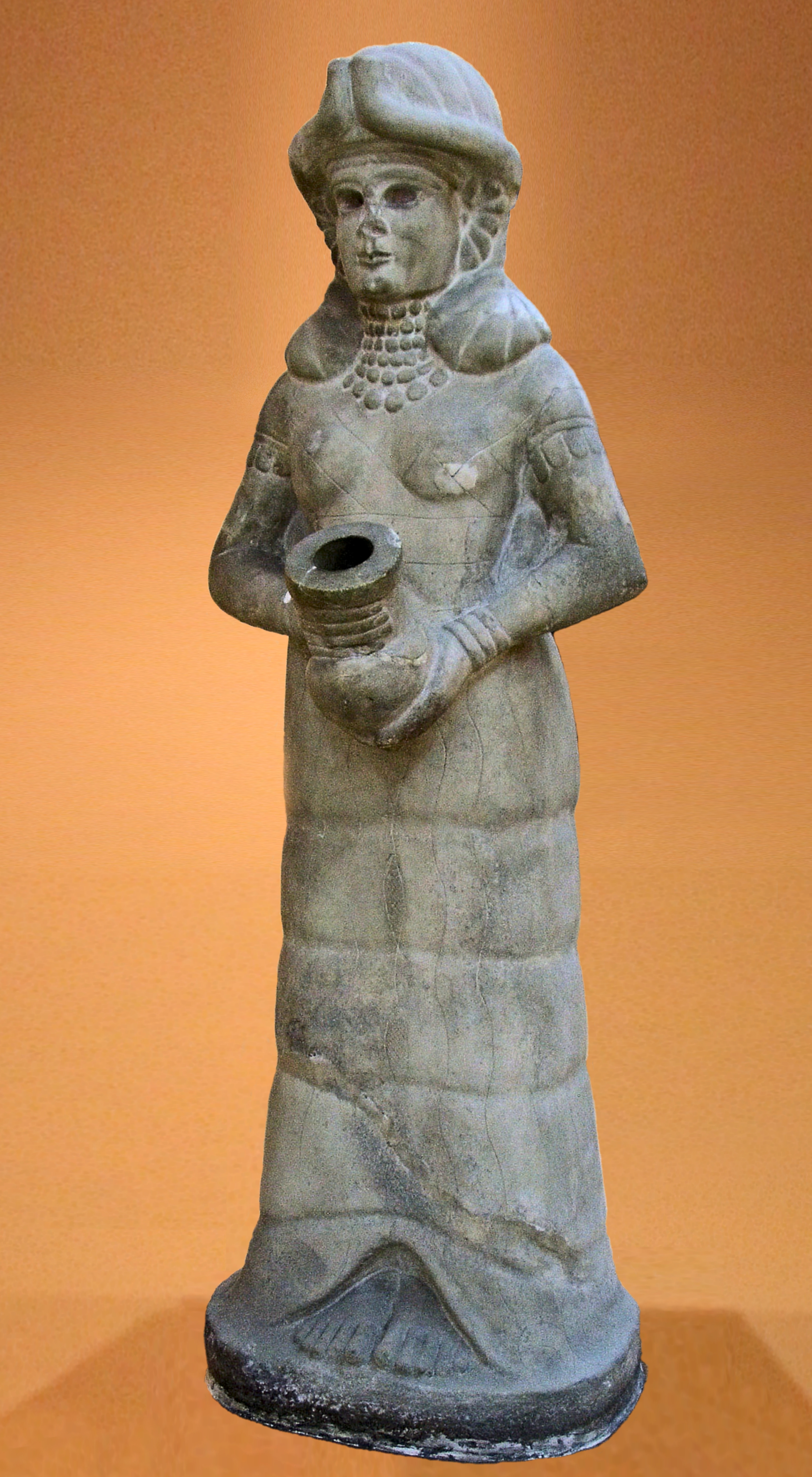
Goddess of the vase, Mari, 18th century BC

Yahdun-Lim started his reign by subduing seven of his rebelling tribal leaders, and rebuilding the walls of Mari and Terqa in addition to building a new fort which he named Dur-Yahdun-Lim. He then expanded west and claimed to have reached the Mediterranean, however he later had to face a rebellion by the Yaminite nomads who were centered at Tuttul, and the rebels were supported by Yamhad's king Sumu-Epuh, whose interests were threatened by the recently established alliance between Yahdun-Lim and Eshnunna. Yahdun-Lim defeated the Yaminites but an open war with Yamhad was avoided, as the Mariote king became occupied by his rivalry with Shamshi-Adad I of Shubat-Enlil, the son of the late Ila-kabkabu. The war ended in a defeat for Mari, and Yahdun-Lim was assassinated in c. 1798 BC by his possible son Sumu-Yamam, who himself got assassinated two years after ascending the throne while Shamshi-Adad Iadvanced and annexed Mari.

==== Shamshi-Adad I and Yasmah-Adad ====
Shamshi-Adad I (r. 1809-1775 BC), ruler of the Kingdom of Upper Mesopotamia, appointed his son Yasmah-Adad on the throne of Mari, the new king married Yahdun-Lim's daughter, while the rest of the Lim family took refuge in Yamhad, and the annexation was officially justified by what Shamshi-Adad I considered sinful acts committed by the Lim family. To strengthen his position against his new enemy Yamhad, Shamshi-Adad I married Yasmah-Adad to Beltum, the daughter of Ishi-Addu of Qatna. However, Yasmah-Adad neglected his bride causing a crisis with Qatna, and he proved to be an unable leader causing the rage of his father who died in c. 1776 BC, while the armies of Yarim-Lim I of Yamhad were advancing in support of Zimri-Lim, the heir of the Lim dynasty. (Note: Although officially a son of Yahdun-Lim, in reality he was a grandchild or nephew.)

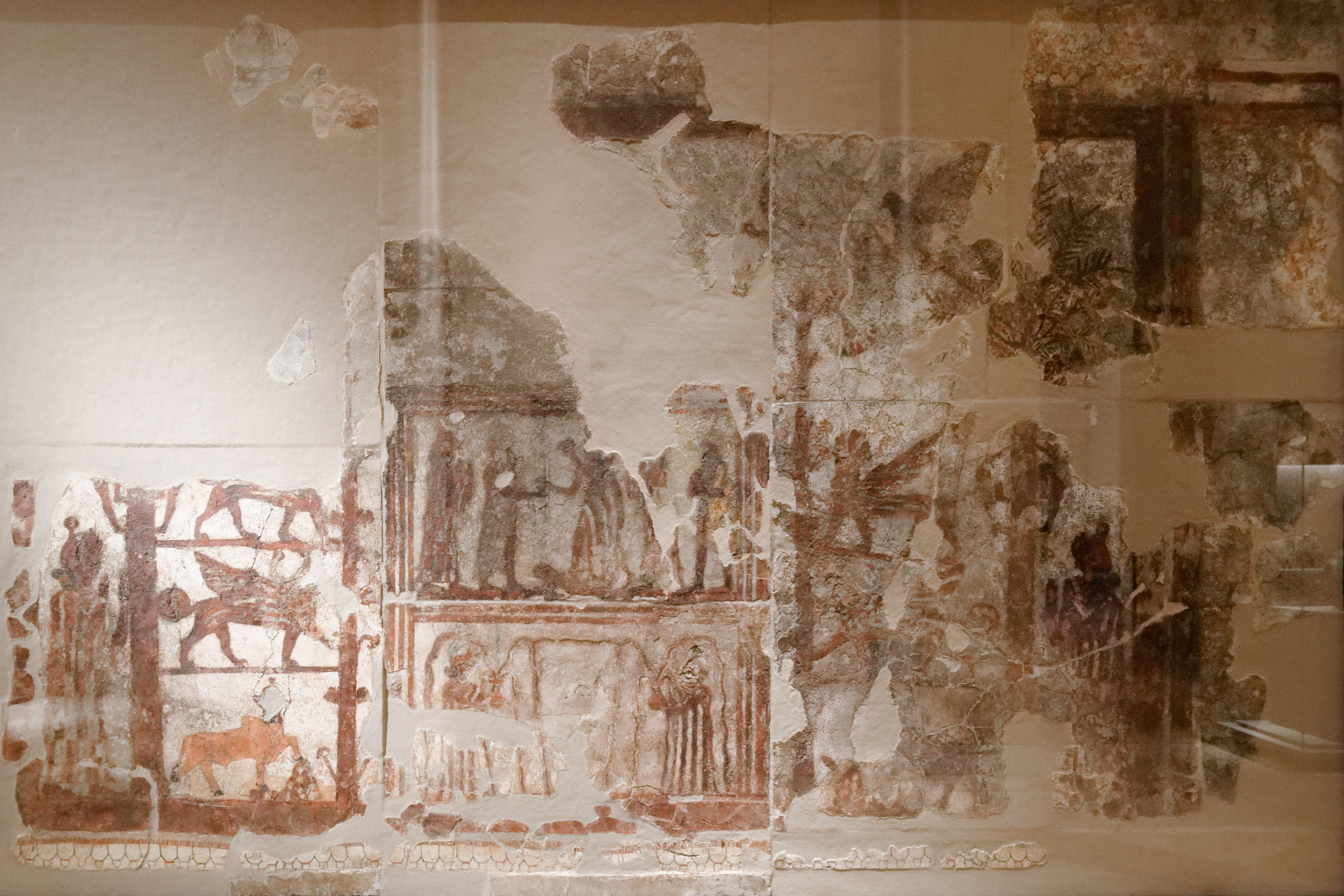
Investiture of Zimri-Lim (18th century BC)

==== Zimri-Lim of Mari ====
After the death of Shamshi-Adad I, as Zimri-Lim advanced, a leader of the Sim'alites (Zimri-Lim's tribe) overthrew Yasmah-Adad, opening the road for Zimri-Lim who arrived a few months after Yasmah-Adad's escape, and married princess Shibtu, a daughter of Yarim-Lim I, a short time after his enthronement in c. 1776 BC. Zimri-Lim's ascension to the throne with the help of Yarim-Lim I affected Mari's status, Zimri-Lim referred to Yarim-Lim as his father, and the Yamhadite king was able to order Mari as the mediator between Yamhad's main deity Hadad and Zimri-Lim, who declared himself a servant of Hadad.

Zimri-Lim started his reign with a campaign against the Yaminites, he also established alliances with Eshnunna and Hammurabi of Babylon, and sent his armies to aid the Babylonians. The new king directed his expansion policy toward the north in the Upper Khabur region, which was named Idamaraz, where he subjugated the local petty kingdoms in the region such as Urkesh, and Talhayum, forcing them into vassalage. The expansion was met by the resistance of Qarni-Lim, the king of Andarig, whom Zimri-Lim defeated, securing the Mariote control over the region in c. 1771 BC, and the kingdom prospered as a trading center and entered a period of relative peace. Zimri-Lim's greatest heritage was the renovation of the Royal Palace, which was expanded greatly to contain 275 rooms, exquisite artifacts such as The Goddess of the Vase statue, and a royal archive that contained thousands of tablets.

==== Babylonian period ====
Mari's relations with Babylon worsened with a dispute over the city of Hīt that consumed much time in negotiations, during which a war against Elam involved both kingdoms in c. 1765 BC. Babylon invaded in c. 1761 BC under the rule of Hammurabi and defeated Zimri-Lin, ending the Lim dynasty, while Terqa became the capital of a rump state called the Kingdom of Ḫana. In the south, the region of Suhum became a Babylonian province.

Mari survived the destruction and rebelled against Babylon in c. 1759 BC, which prompted Hammurabi to raze the city. Marc Van De Mieroop suggests that Hammurab, in a gesture of mercy, may have allowed Mari to survive as a small village under Babylonian administration.

=== Late Bronze Age ===
Mari became part of Assyria and was listed among the territories conquered by the Assyrian king Tukulti-Ninurta I (r. 1243–1207 BC). Mari frequently changed hands between Assyria and Babylon.

=== Iron Age ===
In the middle of the eleventh century BC, Mari became part of Hana. The king of Hana Tukulti-Mer assumed the title king of Mari and rebelled against Assyria, prompting Assyrian king Ashur-bel-kala (r. 1074–1056 BC) to attack. In the first half of the 8th century BC Mari came firmly under the authority of the Neo-Assyrian Empire. It was assigned to the governorship of a certain Nergal-Erish, under the authority of king Adad-Nirari III (r. 810–783 BC).

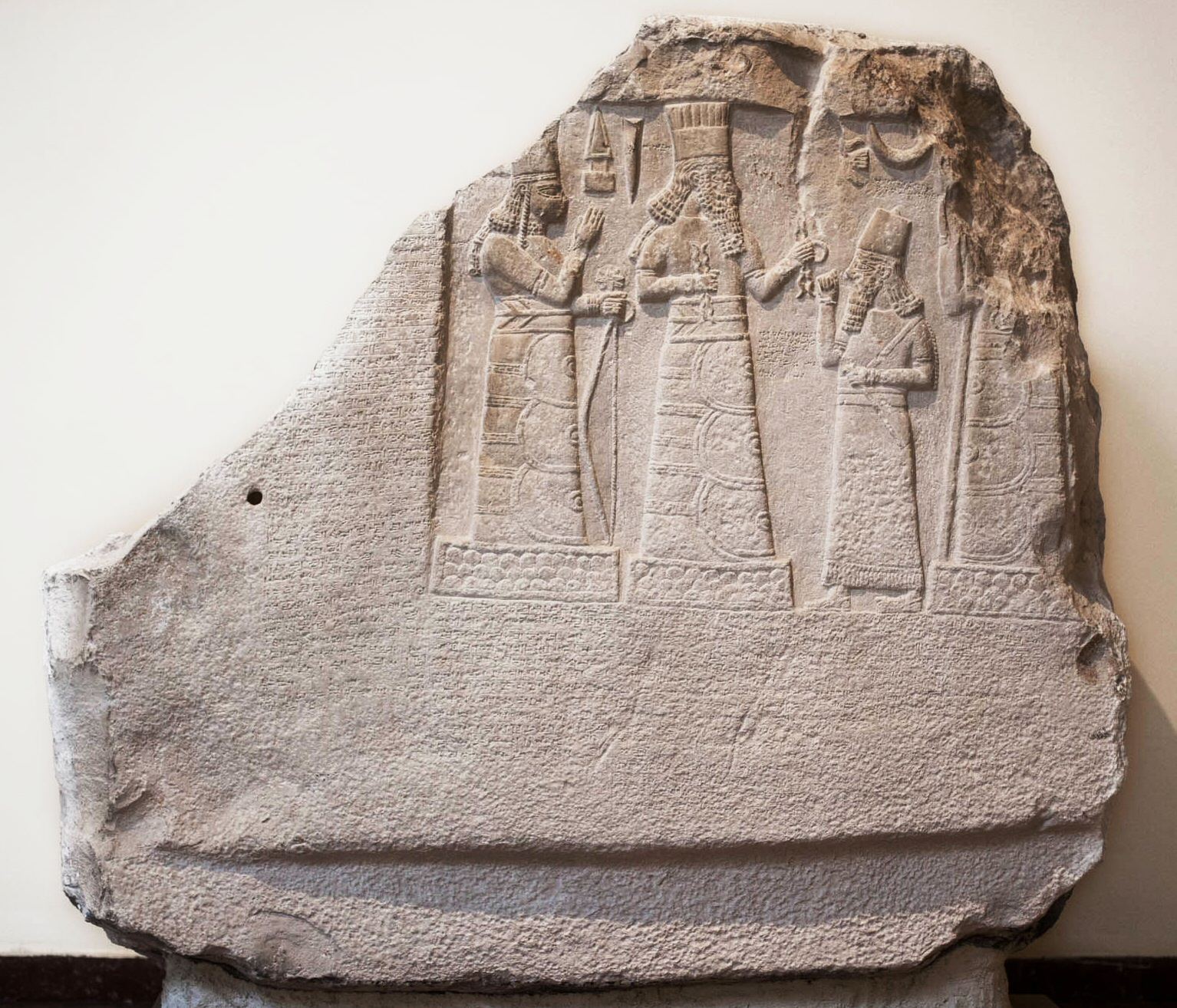
Shamash-Risha-Usur (c. 760 BC)

In c. 760 BC Shamash-Risha-Usur, an autonomous administrator under the nominal authority of Ashur-dan III, ruled parts of the upper middle Euphrates; he styled himself the governor of the lands of Suhu and Mari, as did his son Ninurta-Kudurri-Usur. In 760 BC Mari was part of Laqe, (Note: An ancient designation for the land that include the confluence of the Khabur and the Euphrates rivers.), suggesting that the title "governor" was a historical designation.

The city of Mari persisted as a small settlement until the Hellenistic period (323–30 BC) when it disappeared from records.

=== Modern history ===
By 2015, the Islamic State (ISIS) had devastated and systematically looted the site, particularly the Royal Palace of Mari. It was one of the first archaeological sites to be occupied by this group.

== People, language and government ==
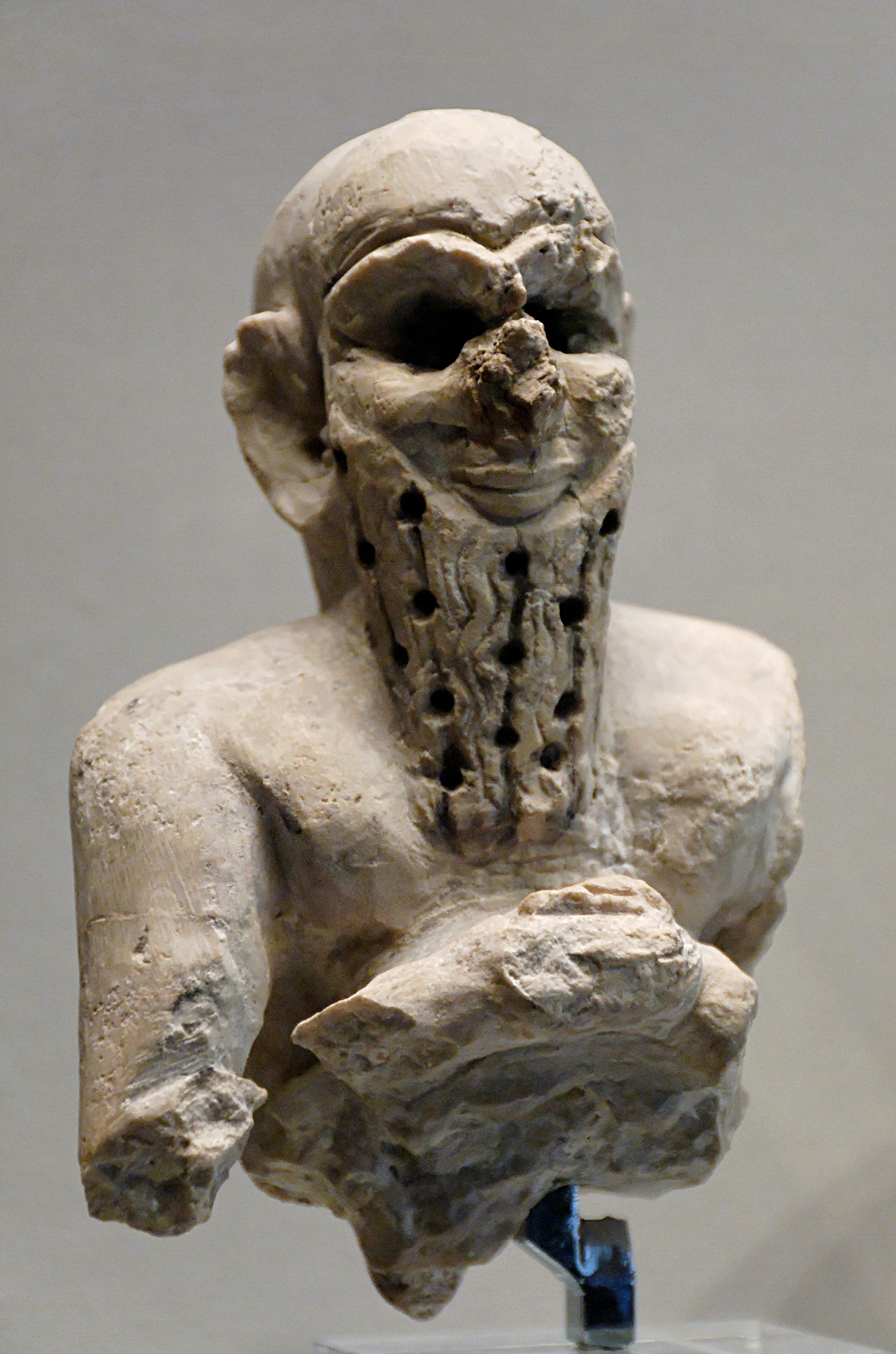
A Mariote from the second kingdom. (25th century BC)

Mari's founders were either Sumerians or speakers of an East Semitic language from Terqa in the north. Ignace Gelb relates Mari's foundation with the proposed Kish civilization, a cultural entity of East Semitic-speaking populations that stretched from the center of Mesopotamia to Ebla in the western Levant.

The population of the second Mari was around 40,000 at its height. The population spoke an East Semitic dialect very similar to the Eblaite language. In the Shakkanakku period, the population spoke Akkadian, also an East Semitic language. West Semitic names started to be attested in Mari from the second kingdom era, and by the middle Bronze-Age, the west Semitic Amorite tribes became the majority of the pastoral groups in the middle Euphrates and Khabur valleys. Amorite names were in use by end of the Shakkanakku period, including by the ruling dynasts.

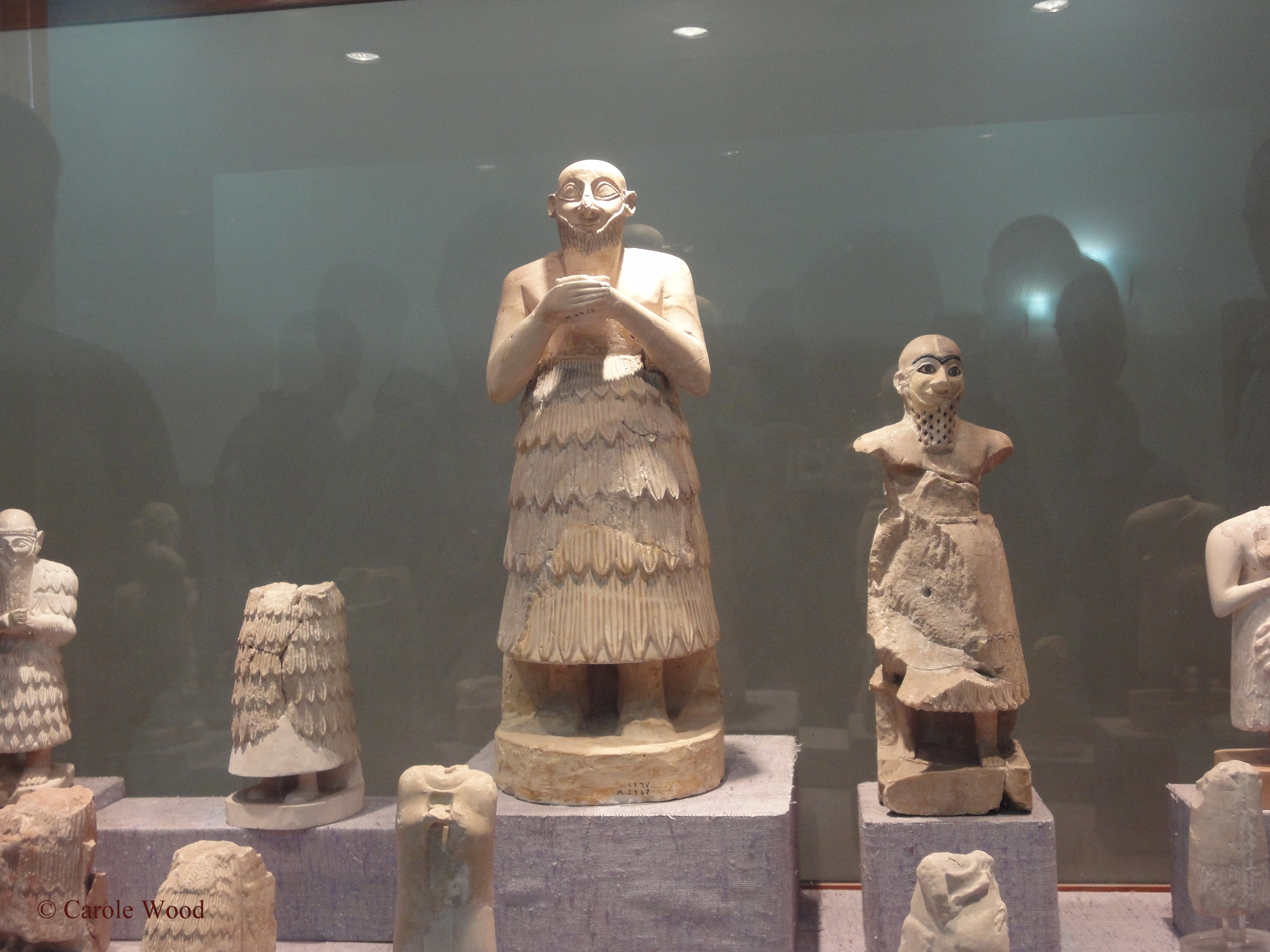
Statues from Mari in the National Museum of Aleppo

Mari's population had become predominantly Amorite during the Lim era. Textual evidence shows the continued use of Akkadian names (Note: Jean-Marie Durand, although not speculating the fate of the East-Semitic population, believe that the Akkadians during the Lim dynasty are not descended from the East-Semites of the Shakkanakku period.) and, although the Amorite language became the dominant tongue, Akkadian remained the language of writing. The pastoral Amorites in Mari were called Haneans, a general term referring to nomads. These Haneans were split into the Yaminites (sons of the south) and Sim'alites (sons of the north), with the ruling house belonging to the Sim'al branch. The kingdom of Mari was also home to tribes of Suteans living in Terqa.

Mari was an absolute monarchy. The king controlled every aspect of administration, with the aid of scribes who filled ministerial roles. During the Lim era, Mari was divided into four provinces in addition to the capital. The provincial seats were located at Terqa, Saggarâtum, Qaṭṭunān, and Tuttul. Each province had its own bureaucracy; the state supplied the villagers with ploughs and other agricultural equipment in return for a share in the harvest.

== Culture and religion ==
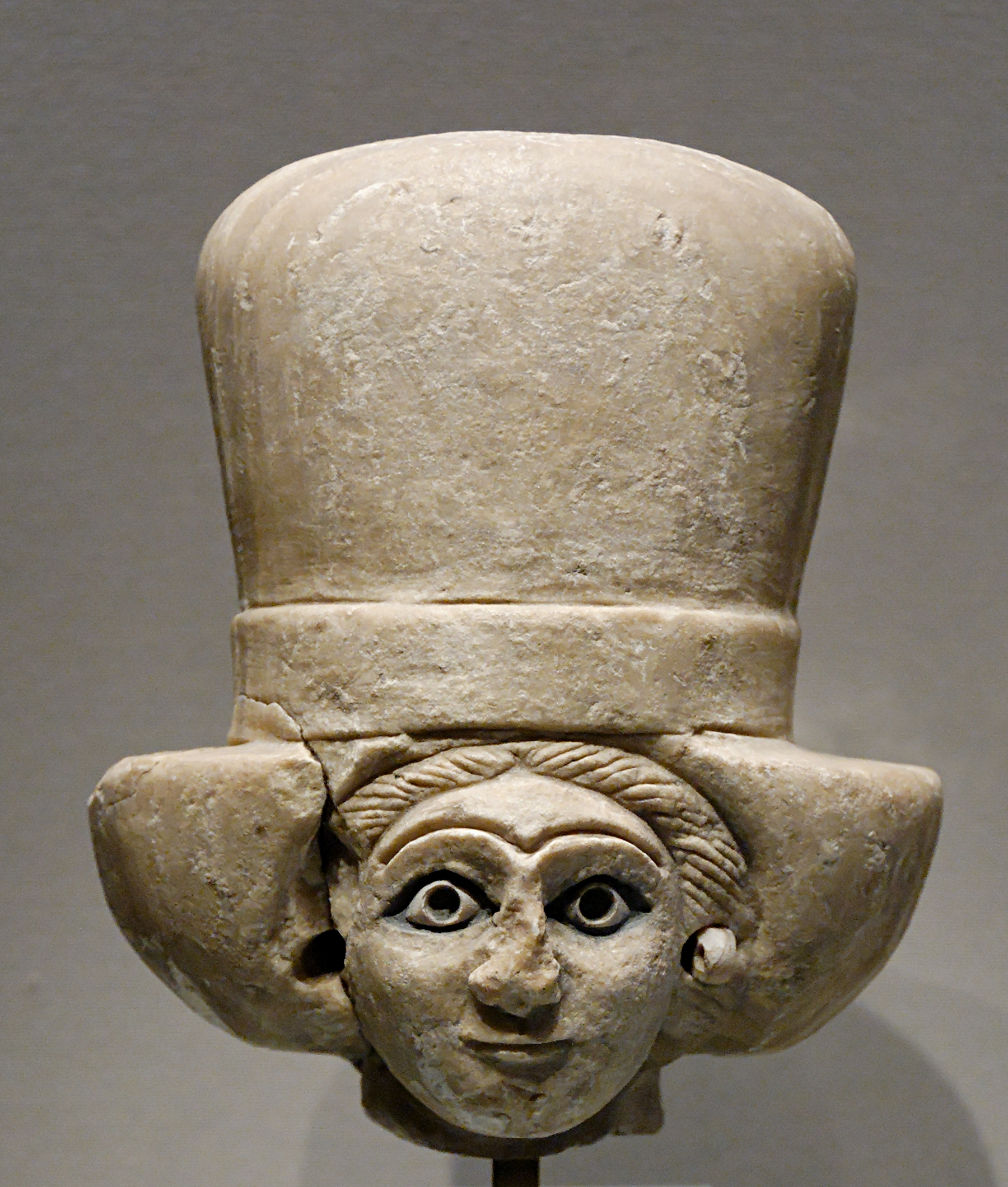
A Mariote woman. (25th century BC)

The first and second kingdoms were heavily influenced by the Sumerian south. The society was led by an urban oligarchy, and the citizenry was known for elaborate hair and dress styles. They used the Eblaite calendar based on a solar year divided into twelve months. Scribes wrote in the Sumerian language; art and architecture was indistinguishable from that of Sumer.

Mesopotamia continued to influence Mariote culture during the Amorite period, evidenced by the Babylonian scribal style used in the city. Mesopotamian influence had lessened since former periods, and objects such as royal seals show a clear Syrian origin. The society was tribal, primarily mostly of farmers and nomads (Haneans), Unlike in Mesopotamia, the Mariote temple played only a minor role in everyday life as state power was invested in the royal palace. Women enjoyed a relative equality to men; queen Shibtu ruled in her husband's name while he was away and she had extensive authority over the highest officials.

The pantheon of Mari included both Sumerian and Semitic deities. For most of Mari's history, Dagan was the head of the pantheon and Mer the patron deity. Semitic deities included Ishtar, Athtar, and Shamash, an omniscient solar god and one of the most important of the pantheon. Sumerian deities included Ninhursag, Dumuzi, Enki, Anu, and Enlil. Prophecy was important to temple activity; prophets participated in religious festivals and gave council to the king.

== Economy ==
The first Mari provided the oldest wheel workshop yet discovered in Syria, and was a center of bronze metallurgy. The city also contained districts devoted to smelting, dyeing, and pottery manufacture, using charcoal brought by river boats from the upper Khabur and Euphrates area.

The second kingdom's economy was based on both agriculture and trade. It was centralized and directed through a communal organization, with grain stored in communal granaries and distributed according to social status. The organization also controlled the animal herds in the kingdom. Some groups were direct beneficiaries of the palace instead of the communal organization, including the metal and textile producers and military officials. Ebla was an important trading partner and rival, Mari's position made it an important trading center astride the road linking the Levant and Mesopotamia.

The Amorite Mari maintained the older aspects of the economy, still largely based on irrigated agriculture along the Euphrates valley. The city remained a trading center for merchants from Babylonia and other kingdoms, with goods from the south and east transported on riverboats bound for the north, northwest and west. The main trade was metals and tin from the Iranian Plateau exported west as far as Crete. Other goods included copper from Cyprus, silver from Anatolia, wood from Lebanon, gold from Egypt, olive oil, wine, and textiles, and even precious stones from modern Afghanistan.

== Excavations and archive ==
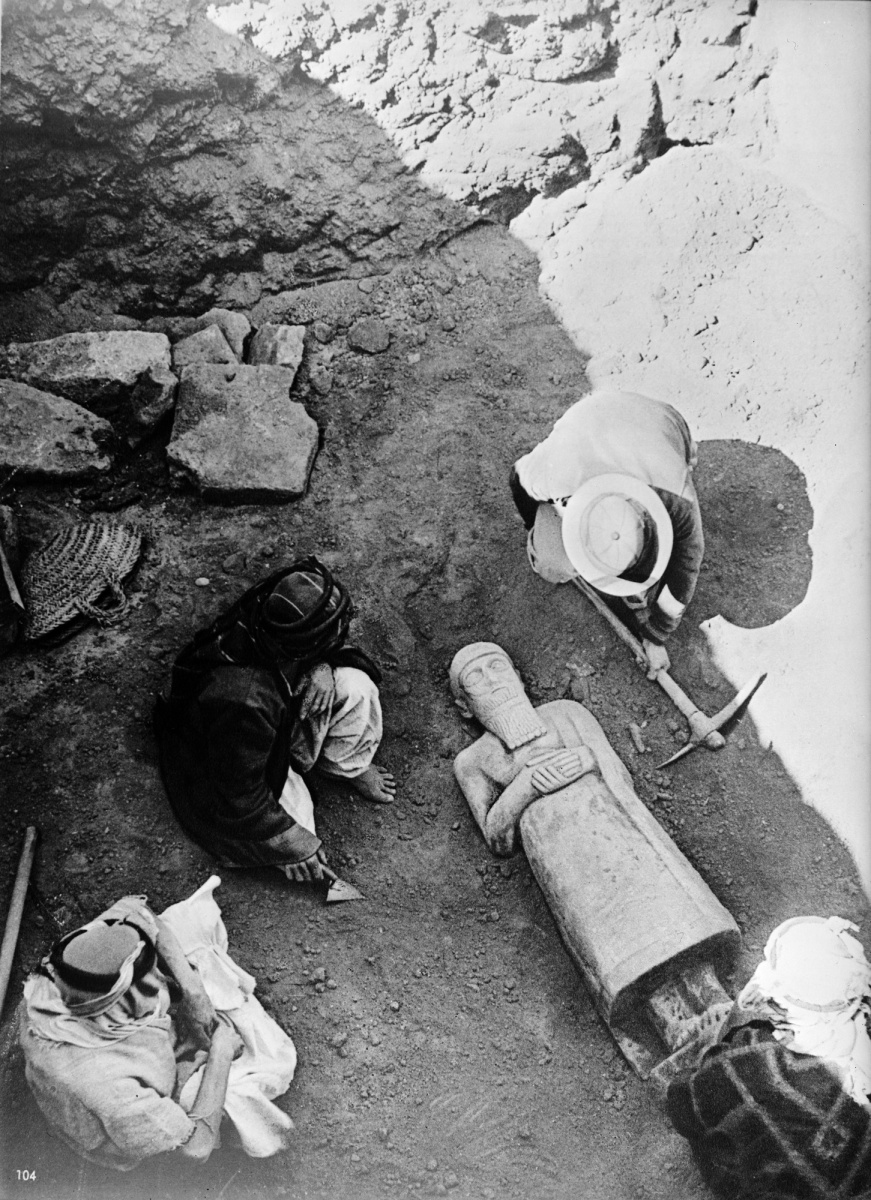
Excavations by the archaeological team of André Parrot in 1936. Discovery of the statue of military Governor Ishtup-Ilum

Mari was discovered in 1933, on the eastern flank of Syria, near the Iraqi border. A Bedouin tribe was digging through a mound called Tell Hariri for a gravestone that would be used for a recently deceased tribesman, when they came across a headless statue. After the news reached the French authorities currently in control of Syria, the report was investigated, and digging on the site was started on December 14, 1933, by archaeologists from the Louvre in Paris. The location of the fragment was excavated, revealing the temple of Ishtar, which led to the commencing of the full scale excavations. Mari was classified by the archaeologists as the "most westerly outpost of Sumerian culture".

Since the beginning of excavations, over 25,000 clay tablets in Akkadian language written in cuneiform were discovered. Finds from the excavation are on display in the Louvre, the National Museum of Aleppo, the National Museum of Damascus, and the Deir ez-Zor Museum. In the latter, the southern façade of the Court of the Palms room from Zimri-Lim's palace has been reconstructed, including the wall paintings.

Mari has been excavated in annual campaigns in 1933–1939, 1951–1956, and since 1960. André Parrot conducted the first 21 seasons up to 1974, and was followed by Jean-Claude Margueron (1979–2004), and Pascal Butterlin (starting in 2005). A journal devoted to the site, released in 8 volumes between 1982 and 1997, was Mari: Annales de recherches interdisciplinaires. Archaeologists have tried to determine how many layers the site descends, according to French archaeologist André Parrot, "each time a vertical probe was commenced in order to trace the site's history down to virgin soil, such important discoveries were made that horizontal digging had to be resumed."

=== Mari tablets ===
Over 20,000 tablets and fragments were found in the burnt library of Zimri-Lim written in Akkadian from a period of 50 years between circa 1800 – 1750 BC. They give information about the kingdom, its customs, and the names of people who lived during that time. More than 3000 are letters, the remainder includes administrative, economic, and judicial texts. Almost all the tablets found were dated to the last 50 years of Mari's independence, and most have now been published. The language of the texts is official Akkadian, but proper names and hints in syntax show that the common language of Mari's inhabitants was Northwest Semitic. Six of the tablets found were in the Hurrian language.

== Current situation ==
Excavations stopped from 2011 as a result of the Syrian Civil War and have not restarted. The site came under the control of armed gangs and suffered large scale looting. A 2014 official report revealed that robbers were focusing on the royal palace, the public baths, the temple of Ishtar, and the temple of Dagan. Based on satellite imagery, looting continued until at least 2017.

== See also ==
- Cities of the Ancient Near East
- Mankisum
- Ornina
- Short chronology timeline
- Statue of Iddi-Ilum
- Tell Beydar
