= Kun-Damu =

King of Ebla
- Reign: c. 2400 BC
- Predecessor: Possibly Eshar-Malik
- Successor: Possibly Adub-Damu

Kun-Damu (also Qum-Damu; fl. c. 2400 BC) was a king (Malikum) of the first Eblaite kingdom ruling c. 2400 BC. The king's name is translated as "Arise, O Damu". (Note: Damu was probably an old Semitic deity and not identical with the Sumerian Damu.) Kun-Damu is attested in the archives of Ebla dated two generations after his reign. According to Alfonso Archi, he was a contemporary of Saʿumu of Mari. The archives of Ebla records the defeat of Mari in the 25th century BC, and based on the estimations for his reign, Kun-Damu might be the Eblaite king who inflicted this defeat upon Mari. Aleppo might have came under the rule of Ebla during his reign. Following his death, he was deified and his cult was attested in Ebla for at least 30 years after his reign.

King Kun-Damu of Ebla
Regnal titles
Preceded by Possibly Eshar-Malik	King of Ebla c. 2400 BC	Succeeded by Possibly Adub-Damu

== See also ==
- Eblaite-Mariote war
