= Iblul-Il =

King of Mari
- Reign: c. 2380 BC
- Predecessor: Possibly Saʿumu
- Successor: Possibly Nizi
- Died: c. 2380 BC
- Spouse: Paba

Iblul-Il (died c. 2380 BC) was the most energetic king (Lugal) of the second Mariote kingdom, noted for his extensive campaigns in the middle Euphrates valley against the Eblaites, and in the upper Tigris region against various opponents, which asserted the Mariote supremacy in the Syrian north.

== Reign ==
=== Sources ===
Iblul-Il is attested in Mari, where statues bearing his name were excavated in 1952 from the city's temples. However, the deeds of the king are recorded in a letter sent to Ebla by Enna-Dagan, a successor of Iblul-Il.

=== Campaigns ===
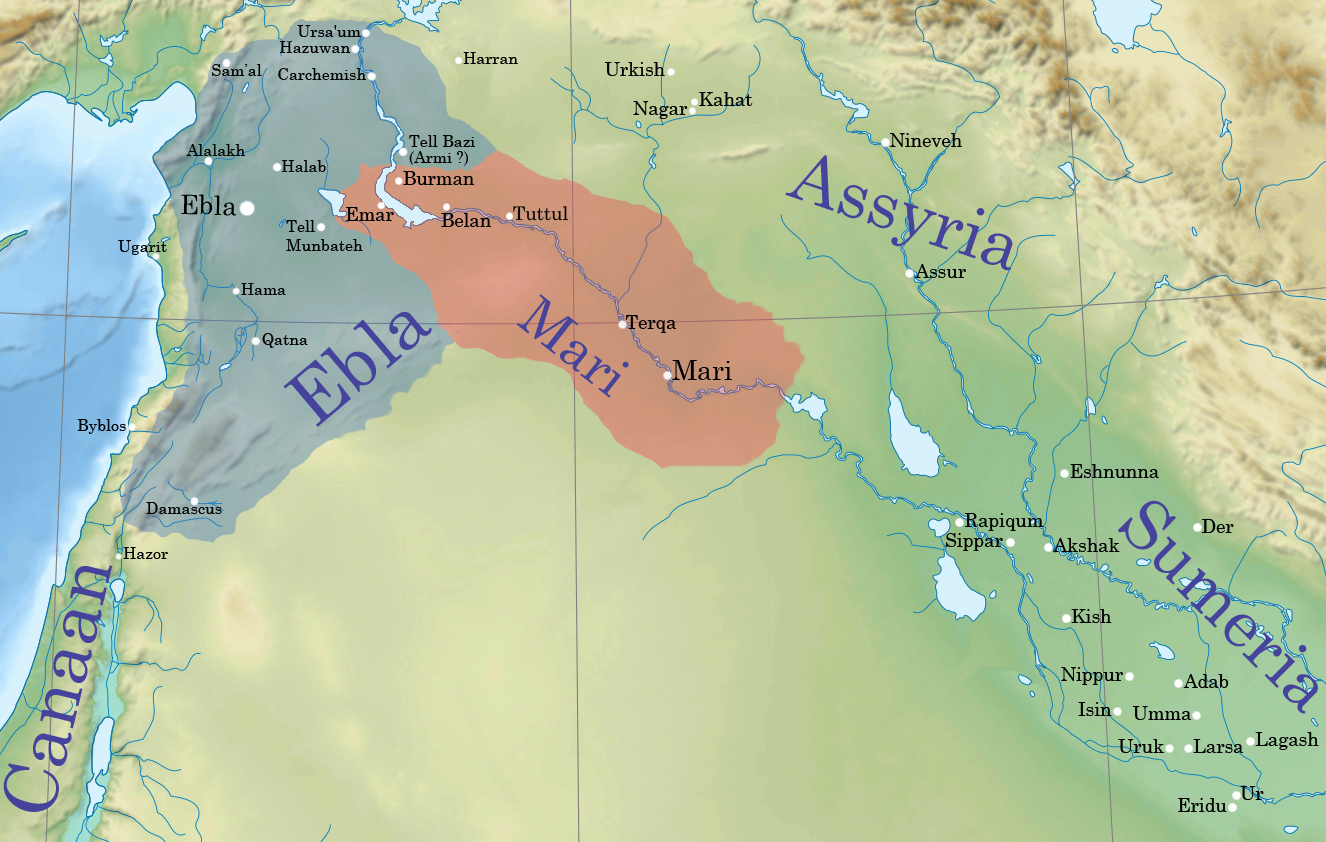
Second Mariote kingdom during the reign of Iblul-Il

Iblul-Il campaigned extensively against Ebla and its vassals and allies. The offensive was probably due to Ebla's increasing militaristic character, and was meant to block the trade route between Kish, Nagar, and Ebla. Iblul-Il was a contemporary of Ebla's king Igrish-Halam, and is mentioned in the letter of Enna-Dagan campaigning in the middle Euphrates defeating the city of Galalaneni, and engaging in a victorious battle with Abarsal in the region of Zahiran, (Note: Abarsal is probably located along the Euphrates river east of Ebla.) which he destroyed. Next, Iblul-Il campaigned in the region of Burman of the land of Sugurum, where he defeated the cities of Shadab, Addalini and Arisum. The campaigns continued as the king sacked the cities of Sharan and Dammium, and advanced on Neraad and Hasuwan, receiving the tribute from Ebla at the city of Mane, and from the fortress Khazuwan, then continued his march and conquered Emar.

In the Tigris valley, Iblul-Il defeated the cities of Nahal, Nubat and Sha-da from the region of Gasur, at a battle in the land of Ganane. (Note: According to Michael Astour, those three cities belonged to the region named Gasur-Nuzi in the northern Tigris area. However, other scholars such as Marco Bonechi place Gasur in the middle Euphrates valley to the northwest of Mari.) Iblul-Il is finally mentioned in the letter conquering the Eblaite cities of Barama, Aburu, Tibalat and Belan. (Note: Belan is located 26 km west of Raqqa.) The Mariote king successfully achieved his goals and weakened Ebla, exacting a great amount of tribute in the form of gold and silver.

=== Succession ===
Iblul-Il was succeeded by Nizi. The letter of Enna-Dagan is extremely difficult to read, and early decipherment presented the author as a general of Ebla who defeated and deposed Iblul-Il. However, newer readings confirmed Enna-Dagan as a king from Mari, and further decipherment of the archives of Ebla showed Enna-Dagan receiving gifts from Ebla as a prince of Mari during the reigns of his Mariote predecessors.

King Iblul-Il of Mari
Regnal titles
Preceded by Possibly Saʿumu	King of Mari c. 2380 BC	Succeeded by Possibly Nizi

== See also ==
- Eblaite-Mariote war
