= Saʿumu =

King of Mari
- Reign: c. 2416 – c. 2400 BC
- Predecessor: Possibly Ansud
- Successor: Possibly Ishtup-Ishar
- Died: c. 2400 BC

Saʿumu (died c. 2400 BC) was a king (Lugal) of the second Mariote kingdom who reigned c. 2416–2400 BC. Some scholars, such as Joseph Pagan, interpreted the king's name as derived from the root "ś-y-m", a cognate of the Akkadian word "šâmu-m", meaning "to buy".

In a letter written by the later Mariote king Enna-Dagan, Saʿumu is attested launching a major attack on the Eblaites. The king's campaigns recorded in the letter were concentrated in the middle Euphrates valley east of Emar, where he defeated the cities of Tibalat and Ilwani, leaving ruins in the mountainous area of Angai. Saʿumu continued his war defeating the cities of Ra'ak, Nirum, (Note: Located in the Euphrates' middle valley close to Sweyhat.) Ashaldu and Badul, leaving ruins in the borders of Nahal's region.

King Saʿumu of Mari
Regnal titles
Preceded by Possibly Ansud	King of Mari c. 2416 - c. 2400 BC	Succeeded by Possibly Ishtup-Ishar

== See also ==
- Eblaite-Mariote war
