= Michael Astour =

Michael Czernichow Astour (December 17, (Note: It is not known whether this refers to the Julian calendar then current in Russia or to the reckoning of the Gregorian calendar, (Weingartner 2015, p. 6)) 1916 Kharkov – October 7, 2004 St. Louis) was professor of Yiddish and Russian literature at Brandeis University and from 1969 professor of history (classical civilization and the ancient Near East) at Southern Illinois University at Edwardsville.

== Biography ==
=== Early life ===
Astour was born into a non-observant Jewish family, only son of a lawyer and essayist, Joseph Czernichow, and his wife, the historian Rachel Hoffmann. (Note: Astour reflects his adoption of this pen name in pre-war Poland, which he subsequently made his legal name after emigrating to the United States, (Weingartner 2015, p. 5)) In 1921, the family relocated from Kharkov, then part of the Soviet Union, to Kaunas in Lithuania, which had recently achieved independence. The move was influenced by concerns for security: he had been a defense attorney at the revolutionary tribunals set up in Russia after the October Revolution, representing people accused by the Cheka of involvement in counter-revolutionary activities. In 1924 they settled in Vilna in Poland, where he received his secondary schooling at the Vilna Yiddish high school, growing up trilingual as a native speaker of Russian, Polish and the Yiddish of his Ashkenazi community. Abraham Sutzkever became a family friend. Astour later acquired fluency in French, German and English, together with a good knowledge of both Italian and Hebrew. Astour revered his father (who was also one of the founders of YIVO) and absorbed his militantly anti-religious outlook. When the father was appointed to the chair of the Vilna Kehilla in 1937, he refused to attend synagogue, an example followed by his son.

=== Youth ===
Following in the steps of his father, Astour became an activist in the Jewish Territorial Organization (JTO), and, from 1935 onwards, militated in the Freeland League (Frayland-lige far Yidisher Teritoryalistisher Kolonizatsye) which envisaged the possibility of setting up a Jewish enclave in some sparsely populated area of the world beyond Europe and the Middle East, with the consent of the hosting society/nation. Among the countries under consideration were Madagascar, the Guianas, and Australia. (Note: With regard to the last, the establishment of an initial population of 75,000 Jews on 7 million acres in the sparsely populated Kimberley region of northwestern Australia was envisioned (Weingartner 2015, p. 12).) It has been said that to this day this work 'remains the most comprehensive piece of research on territorialist thought of the 1930s.'

He retained a deep lifelong antipathy to Zionism, and, once the latter movement achieved its goal of statehood (1948), to Israel. (Note: "Michael's antipathy—'hatred' might not be too strong a term—for Zionism and for the modern state of Israel, which realized the Zionist dream in 1948, remained strong until the end of his life...Unlike Zionists, who insisted on the necessity of a sovereign state in Eretz Israel, territorialists, recognizing the difficulty that would arise from appropriating land already populated by Arabs, worked towards securing a Yiddish-speaking, agrarian socialist, but not politically independent area of settlement for Eastern European Jews in some thinly populated part of the world, where Jews would co-exist with non-Jews willing to accept them." (Weingartner 2015, p. 8)) At 15 he was elected member of the organizing committee of the local territorialist youth groups, dubbed "Hawks" (Shparber in Yiddish). (Note: German Sperber means Sparrowhawk.) To distinguish himself from his well-known father, he adopted a pen name, Astour, which likewise bore an ornithological resonance, since, he recalled in a late interview, it was a gallicized form of a Latin word astur, denoting a species of hawk. (Note: Astur is a late Latin formation from the Greek asterias, denoting a species of goshawk, from its "starred" plumage. Aelian equates it with the "golden eagle" (khrusa'etos) describing it as the largest of eagles, capable of attacking even bulls.) and which he adopted as his legal name on securing a job in the United States, in 1960.

=== Paris ===
From October 1934 to 1937 he undertook advanced studies in Paris at the Sorbonne, where he became acquainted with and studied under scholars such as Charles Virolleaud, who introduced him to Ugaritic, and Charles Picard with whom he studied Greek archaeology. He also attended courses on Egyptology with Raymond Weill, Adolphe Lods in Hebrew and biblical studies, and André Pigagnol in Roman history. Julius Beloch's influential thesis (1894) that the Phoenician influences on Greece were unfounded assumptions prevailed. The only dissent from this negation of Semitic influences on Greek civilization was the work of Victor Bérard. Though entertaining some doubts, he accepted the consensus at the time. Astour graduated licencié es-lettres, equivalent to a BA, and prepared for a doctorate at the École des Hautes Études of the University of Paris. In October 1937 he visited Palestine and stayed for several months. On his return to Paris in October 1938, he changed plans and enrolled to do agricultural sciences at the École Supérieure Nationale d'Agronomie de Grignon.

=== World War II ===
On the eve of World War II in 1939, against his parents' advice, he broke off his studies and returned to Vilna. Astour and his father were arrested, together with another 1,800 people, in a Red Army roundup. The father's detention probably related to his record as a defense attorney two decades earlier. A German blitz took Vilnius on June 24, 1941, and Jews, among whom Astour's mother Rachel, were confined to two ghettos. In retreating the Soviets evacuated their prisoners in a forced march and, when Astour's father was unable to keep up on the march towards Bobruisk, he was executed. His mother Rachel was consigned to the ghetto reserved for those marked down for immediate execution and she was murdered, along with another 40,000 Vilna Jews, by SS Sonderkommandos and Lithuanian auxiliaries in Ponary Forest 8 miles southwest of the city.

The reason given for Astour's arrest was his role as a member of the Hawks. Without the preliminaries of a trial, he was given a five year sentence to labour camps. Transported to the Ukhto-Izhemskiy camp complex in the Komi Republic just south of the Arctic Circle, he was assigned to work at a Vodnyi installation where radium was extracted from radioactive water wells. Guards and zeks helped him survive three close calls with death. He was esteemed by both for his ability to recite poems and tell stories in several languages. (Note: An identical set of circumstances allowed Osip Mandelstam, a poet Astour held in the highest esteem, to survive longer than he otherwise would have. Fearful of being poisoned he abstained from camp soup, but did eat what criminals, to whom he recited poetry, gave him (Mandelstam 1975, p. 473).) Astour was to spend much of the subsequent decade in Soviet political prisons and gulags.

After relations were established with the Polish government-in-exile, Astour was the immediate beneficiary of an amnesty, being released in September 1941. He made two unsuccessful attempts to cross to Iran, the second time in 1943 when the battle of Stalingrad was in its closing phase, the USSR declared on 16 January all Poles who had been resident in its territory from November 1939 Soviet citizens. Caught near the frontier he was rearrested for disloyalty and sentenced to 7 years imprisonment for "treason".

=== Release and emigration to the United States ===
On his release in September 1950, he settled in Karaganda also where he met and married Beta Miriam Ostrowska. Access to inter-library loans enabled him to resume his scholarly studies and he managed to have himself repatriated to Warsaw in late 1956 where he gained employment in the Jewish Historical Institute, ending 17 years of isolation. Desiring neither to remain in Poland nor emigrate to Israel, the couple availed themselves of a window of opportunity for displaced Jewish Poles to emigrate to France, arriving there in mid March 1958, and taking up a post as archivist at the Centre de Documentation Juive Contemporaine, while undertaking studies on Akkadian and Assyrian. Still aspiring to return to scholarship he emigrated to the US in late 1959, becoming a US citizen five years later.

=== Academic career in the United States ===
Alerted also by a letter of recommendation from Virolleaud of Astour's research projects to explore Greek-West Asian links, Cyrus Gordon, chair of the Department of Mediterranean and Classical Studies at Brandeis University, and like Virolleaud a leading expert on Ugaritic, appointed him to the Jacob D. Berg Chair in Yiddish culture, where he was to teach Yiddish and Russian, while pursuing doctoral studies under Gordon. He obtained a doctorate with his dissertation on Hellonosemitica in June 1962. After some years at Brandeis, Astour was informed he had no future teaching there, and he took up an offer to teach as an assistant professor of ancient history at Southern Illinois University in 1965. Astour believed that the refusal of strong pro-Zionist Brandeis authorities to offer him the prospect of tenure was related to his vigorous opposition to Israel.

Astour played an important role in retrieving, and subsequently editing, the 9th volume of Israël Zinberg's monumental Yiddish History of Jewish Literature. The final volume, which Zinberg had been working on when he was seized by the Soviet authorities and sent to a Siberian gulag, where he died in 1939, turned up in a Leningrad library in 1962. Astour also wrote and published in 1967 a 900-page book in two volumes on the history of the Freeland League and the territorialist concept.

Astour was honored by a Festschrift in 1997, and, on reaching the statutory retirement age of 70, was obliged to take the pension in 1987, though he remained active in scholarly work until his death. He left uncompleted a comprehensive manuscript on ancient Syrian toponomy, running to nearly 1,000 pages, which was intended to be his magnum opus, entitled Topography and Toponymy of Northern Syria. The discovery of the Eblaite archives, which promised to yield a further huge mass of new material on the area's ancient geography compelled Astour to defer publication indefinitely.

His wife died on January 22, 2000, and received a Jewish burial. Astour died, following emergency abdominal surgery, on October 7, 2004, and was cremated.

=== Zionism, Israel and Jewishness ===
Astour bore a lifetime grudge against Zionism, arising from its influence in marginalizing the Freeland Movement. He wrote at one point of:-

the unbelievable acts of betrayal against the interests of the Jewish people committed by the rich Jewish relief organizations and by the powerful Zionist apparatus, whose official and unofficial representatives did their best, by intervening with the governments in question, to wreck the salvation efforts of the Freeland League.

In his view, Zionist exclusivism had exercised a negative impact which had profound implications for the Jewish people. He took strong exception to what he perceived to be Zionist ruthlessness in achieving their aims in Palestine on the eve of World War II when the lives of Jewish refugees were imperiled, as illustrated by a remark made by David Ben-Gurion just after Kristallnacht. (Note: "Was Ben-Gurion also right when he wrote to the Zionist executive on December 17, 1938, more than a month after the Crystal Night, that 'millions of Jews face annihilation,' but that their rescue 'endangers Zionism,' because 'if Jews will have to choose between the refugees, saving Jews from concentration camps, and assisting a national museum in Palestine, mercy will have the upper hand and the whole energy of the people will be channeled into saving Jews…; hence one must oppose such action'?." (Weingartner 2015, p. 57)) He went as far as to liken Israeli treatment of Palestinians to the Nazi persecution of Jews, a position that echoed the view of Yeshayahu Leibowitz. (Note: "Only now the Palestinian[s] and Lebanese are in the role of the Jews…and the Israelis–in the words of a Hebrew University in Jerusalem professor—are the 'Judeo-Nazis.' But at least the German Nazis used their own weapons, designed, produced, and paid for by themselves, while Begin's army uses American planes, cluster bombs and other weapons." (Weingartner 2015, p. 62)) His outrage was particularly vehement in reacting to the Israeli Invasion of Lebanon in 1982, American support for which led him to repudiate the Democratic Party. He went to far as to argue that the antisemitic fiction of the "Elders of Zion" had been realized in the form of the Zionist lobby.

He never reconciled himself to the post-Holocaust world, and of his personal identity as a Jew he wrote late in life:

It is difficult to identify oneself with the Israeli brand of Jewishness. My personal tragedy, however, is that neither can I feel differently with regard to American Jewishness. My kind of Jewish people has [sic] been exterminated, and there is no substitute for it.

=== Hellenosemitica and its reception ===
Long before Hellenism imposed itself over the ancient civilizations of the East, Semitism had exercised no less an impact upon the young civilization of Greece. Hellenism became the epilogue of the Oriental civilizations, but Semitism was the prologue of Greek civilization. (Note: "Intensive contacts exist in the twelfth century and then again in the ninth/eighth centuries, when Greek traders establish settlements in Syria, until there is a true breakthrough of Eastern fashion about 700 with the Orientalizing Style; then from 600 onwards, thanks to the role of Greek mercenaries in the twenty-sixth dynasty, Egypt sets the tone. But before the seventh century is over, the culture drift is reversed; Greek art now comes into its own and for centuries is taken as a model by both East and West." (Burkert 1987, pp. 18–19, 52))

Astour's book did not emerge out of thin air. His sponsor Cyrus Gordon had been publishing along similar lines at the time, and three years earlier had published on The Common Background of Greek and Hebrew Civilizations. The German Jewish Hittitologist H. G. Güterbock, the British archaeologist and classicist T. B. L. Webster, Joseph Fontenrose and Peter Walcot, (Note: Walcot's Hesiod and the Near East (University of Wales Press) appeared in 1966) to name a few, had been exploring similar ideas of eastern, especially Anatolian, influences on the formation of Greece. However, as is now widely acknowledged, a prejudice against the topic had set in from the 19th century. M. L. West mentions that a work written in 1658 by a fellow of Corpus Christi College Zachary Bogan, Homericus, sive comparatio Homeri com scriptoribus sacris quoad norman loquendi, drew numerous parallels between biblical texts and phrases in both Homer and Hesiod. Neglect of the work was such that West believed he was the only person to have consulted a copy at Oxford in the preceding 200 years.

Analyzing the "ideological protectionism" that set in to fracture the "Greek-Orient" axis, Walter Burkert cites three factors: the detachment of classical studies from theology; the rise of romantic nationalism which preferred to think in terms of organic growth from individual ethnic origins rather than cross-cultural influences-Jewish emancipation went hand in hand with trends against "Orientalism" giving anti-Semitism an opportunity to get a leg in; and, thirdly, the discovery of Sanskrit and emergence of Indo-European linguistics focused on a common archetype in which Semitic had no place. Thus Ulrich von Wilamowitz-Moellendorf, perhaps the greatest classicist of his time, could write authoritatively in 1884 that,

The peoples and states of the Semites and the Egyptian which gave been decaying for centuries and which, in spite of the antiquity of their culture were unable to contribute anything to the Hellenes other than a few manual skills, costumes, and implements of bad taste, antiquated ornaments, repulsive fetishes for even more repulsive fake divinities. (Note: "Die seit jahrhunderten faulenden völker und staaten der Semiten und Aegypter, die den Hellenen trotz ihrer alten culture nichts hatten abgeben können als ein paar handfertigkeiten and techniken, abgeschmachte trachten und geräte, zopfige ornamente, widerliche fetische für noch widerlichere götzen." (Burkert 1995, p. 154, n.9))

The British archaeologist John Boardman, writing for The Classical Review, found parts critical of classicists as both "crudely partisan" and outdated, stated that it was hard to decide whether or not the book furnished an important contribution to the field. The controversial historian Martin Bernal described the early scholarly reviews of Astour's book as a "battering", so severe that Astour stopped working in this specific field.

== Bibliography ==
=== Books ===
- A History of Jews in Ancient Times (in Yiddish). Warsaw: Yiddish Bukh. 1958.
- Hellenosemitica: An Ethnic and Cultural Study in West Semitic Impact On Mycenaean Greece (PDF). Brill Publishers. 1965.
- History of the Freeland League and of the Territorialist Idea (Die Geshichte fun di Frayland Lige) (in Yiddish). Buenos Aires and New York: Freeland League. 1967.
- The Rabbeans: A Tribal Society On the Euphrates from Yaḫdun-Lim to Julius Caesar. Undena Publications. 1978. ISBN 978-0-890-03050-9.
- Hittite History & Absolute Chronology of the Bronze age. Studies in Mediterranean Archaeology and Literature. Paul Åströms förlag/Coronet Books. 1989. ISBN 978-9-186-09886-5.

=== Edited books ===
- Zinberg, Israel (1966). Di geshikte fun der literature bay yidn. Vol. IX. Brandeis University and CYCO Publishing House.

=== Articles ===
- "The Primitive Notion of Yahweh" [in Yiddish]. YIVO-Bleter 13 (1938): 477-504.
- "Biblical Tradition as a Source of Hebrew Prehistory" [in Polish]. Bulletin of the Institute for Jewish History. 22 (1957): 1-25.
- "The Habiru Problem and the Conquest of Canaan" [in Yiddish]. Bleter far Geshikhte. 11 (1958): 59-90.
- "Benê-Iamina et Jericho." Semitica 9 (1959): 5-20
- "Les étrangers à Ugarit et la statut juridique des ҫabiru." Revue d'Assyriologie et d'Archéologie Orientale 53 (1959): 70-76.
- "Metamorphose de Baal. Les rivalités commerciales du IX siècle." Evidences 75. (January–February 1959: 77 (May–June 1959): 54-58.
- "Review Article of E. Orbach (Auerbach), Hamidbar ve'ereş habḥirah, I" [Yiddish]. Di Goldene Keyt 32 (1959): 236-45.
- "History and Legend: The Conquest of Canaan in the Light of Archaeology." The Zukunft 65 (1960): 109-14.
- "Review Article of A. Dupont-Sommer, Les écrits esséniens, découverts près de la Mer Morts." [Yiddish]. Di Goldene Keyt 35 (1960): 150-59.
- "Place Names from the Kingdom of Alalaҫ in the North Syrian List of Thutmose III: A Study in Historical Topography." Journal of Near Eastern Studies 22 (1963): 220-41.
- "Un texte d'Ugarit récemment découvert et ses rapports avec l'origine des cultes bachiques Grecs." Revue de l'Histoire des Religions 164 (1963): 1-15.
- "Greek Names in the Semitic World and Semitic Names in the Greek World." Journal of Near Eastern Studies 23 (1964): 193-201.
- "Religion of Ancient Jews." Zygmunt Poniatowski, ed., Zarys dziejów religii. Warsaw: Iskry. 1964: 301-29.
- "Second Millennium B.C. Cypriot and Cretan Onomastica Reconsidered." Journal of the American Oriental Society 84 (1964): 240-54.
- "The Amarna Age Forerunners of Biblical Anti-Royalism." For Max Weinrich on his Seventieth Birthday: Studies in Jewish Languages, Literature, and Society. Mouton. The Hague. 1964: 6-17.
- "New Evidence on the Last Days of Ugarit." American Journal of Archaeology 69(1965): 253-58.
- "Sabtah and Sabteca: Ethiopian Pharaoh Names in Genesis 10". Journal of Biblical Literature 84 (1965): 422-25.
- "The Origin of the Terms 'Canaan,' 'Phoenician,' and 'Purple.'" Journal of Near Eastern Studies 24 (1965): 346-50.
- "Aegean Place-Names in an Egyptian Inscription." American Journal of Archaeology 70 (1966): 313-17.
- "Political and Cosmic Symbolism in Genesis 14 and in its Babylonian Sources." Biblical Motifs: Origins and Transformations. Ohilip W. Lown Institute. Brandeis University: Study and Texts III. Harvard University Press. Cambridge, Mass. 1966:65-112.
- "Some New Divine Names from Ugarit." Journal of the American Oriental Society 86 (1966): 277-84.
- "Tamar the Hierodule: An Essay in the Method of Vestigial Motifs." Journal of Biblical Literature 85 (1966): 185-96.
- "The Problem of Semitic in Ancient Crete." Journal of the American Oriental Society 87 (1967): 290-95.
- "Mesopotamian and Transtigridian Place Names in the Medinet Habu Lists of Ramses III." Journal of the American Oriental Society 88 (1968): 733-52.
- "Semitic Elements in the Kumarbi Myth: an Onomastic Inquiry." Journal of Near Eastern Studies 27 (1968): 172-77.
- "Two Ugaritic Serpent Charms." Journal of Near Eastern Studies 27 (1968): 13-36.
- "La triade de déeses de fertilité à Ugarit et en Grèce." C.F.A. Schaeffer, ed. Ugaritica VI. Mission de Ras Shamra XVII. Bibliothèque Archéologique et Historique 81. Institut Franҫais d' Archéologique de Beyrouth. Paris. 1969: 9-23.
- "The Partition of the Confederacy of Mukiš-Nuhašše-Nii by Šuppiluliuma: A Study in Political Geography of the Amarna Age." Orientalia 38 (1969): 381-414.
- "Ma'ҫadu, the Harbor of Ugarit." Journal of the Economic and Social History of the Orient 13 (1970): 113-27.
- "Toponyms in the Hurrian Alphabetic Tablet RS 24.285." Ugarit-Forschungen 2 (1970): 1-6.
- "841 B.C.: The First Assyrian Invasion of Israel." Journal of the American Oriental Society 91 (1971): 383-89.
- "A Letter and Two Economic Texts." L.R. Fisher, ed. The Claremont Ras Shamra Tablets. Analecta Orientalia 28. Pontifical Biblical Institute. Rome 1971: 24-29.
- "Tell Mardiҫ and Ebla." Ugarit Forschungen 3 (1971): 9-19.
- "ҫattušlis, ҫalab, and ҫanigalbat." Journal of Near Eastern Studies 31 (1972): 102-9.
- "Some Recent Works on Ancient Syria and the Sea People." Journal of the American Oriental Society 92 (1972): 447-59.
- "The Merchant Class of Ugarit." D.O. Edzard, ed. Gesellschaftsklassen in Alten Zweistromland und in den angrenzenden Gebieten XVIII. Rencontre Assyriologique Internationale, München. 1972: 11-26.
- "A North Mesopotamian Locale of the Keret Epic?" Ugarit Forschungen 5 (1973):29-39.
- "Note toponymique à la tablette A. 1270 de Mari." Revue d'assyriologie et d'archéologie orientale 67 (1973): 73-75.
- "Ugarit and the Aegean: A Brief Summary of Archaeological and Epigraphic Evidence." H.A. Hoffner, Jr. ed. Orient and Occident: Essays Presented to Cyrus H. Gordon on the Occasion of His Sixty-Fifth Birthday. Alter Orient and Altes Testament 22. Verlag Butzon & Bercker Kevelaer. Neukirchener – Vluyn. 1973: 17-27.
- "Place Names." L.R. Fisher, ed. Ras Shamra Parallels, II. Analecta Orientalia 51.Pontifical Biblical Institute. Rome. 1974: 249-369.
- "Ezekiel's Prophesy of Gog and the Cuthean Legend of Naram-Sin." Journal of Biblical Literature 95 (1976): 567-79.
- "Continuité et changement dans la toponymie de la Syrie du Nord." In La Toponymie Antique: Actes du Colloque de Strasbourg, 12-14 juin 1975. Université des Sciences Humaines de Strasbourg. Travaux du Centre de Recherche sur le Proche-Orient et la Grèce Antique 4. E.J. Brill. Leiden. 1977: 117-41.
- "Tunip-Hamath and its Region: A Contribution to the Historical Geography of Central Syria." Orientalia 46 (1977): 51-64.
- "Les Hourrites en Syrie du Nord: Rapport Sommaire." Revue Hittite et Asianique 36 (1978): 1-22.
- "The Rabbeans: A Tribal Society on the Euphrates from Yahdun-Lim to Julius Caesar". Syro-Mesopotamial Studies 2/1. Malibu, Calif. 12 pp. January 1978.
- "The Arena of Tiglath-Pileser III's Campaign Against Sarduri III (743 B.C.)". Assur 2/3. Malibu, Calif. 23 pp. October 1979.
- "The Kingdom Siyannu-Ušnatu." Ugarit-Forschungen 11 (1979): 13-28.
- "Yahweh in Egyptian Topographic Lists." M. Görg and E. Pusch, eds. Festschrift Elmar Edel. Studien zu Geschichte, Kultur und Religion Ägyptens und des Alten Testament I. Bamberg. 1979: 17-34.
- "King Ammurapi and the Hittite Princess." Ugarit-Forschungen 12 (1980): 103-8.
- "North Syrian Toponyms Derived from Plant Names." G. Rendsburg, R. Adler, M. Arla and N. Winter, eds. The Bible World. Essays in Honor of Cyrus H. Gordon. KTAV Publishing House and the Institute of Hebrew Culture and Education of New York University. New York. 1980: 3-8.
- "The Nether World and Its Denizens at Ugarit." Mesopotamia: Copenhagen Studies in Assyriology 8 (1980): 227-38.
- "Les frontiers et les districts du royaume d'Ugarit (Éléments de topographie historique régionale)". Ugarit-Forschungen 13 (1981): 1-12.
- "Toponymic Parallels Between the Nuzi Area and North Syria, with an appendix: Nuzi Place Names in Egyptian Topographic Lists." M.A. Morrison and D.I. Owen, eds. Studies on the Civilization and Culture of Nuzi and the Hurrians in Honor of Ernest R. Lachemann. Eisenbrauns. Winona Lake, Ind. 1981: 11-26.
- "Ugarit and the Great Powers." G.D. Young, ed. Ugarit in Retrospect: Fifty Years of Ugarit and Ugaritic. Eisenbrauns. Winona Lake, Ind. 1981: 3-29.
- "Ancient Greek Civilization in Southern Italy." The Journal of Aesthetic Education 19 (1985): 23-37.
- "The Name of the Ninth Kassite Ruler." Journal of the American Oriental Society 106 (1986): 327-31.
- "Semites and Hurrians in Northern Transtigris." M.A. Morrison and D.I. Owen, eds. Studies on the Civilization and Culture of Nuzi and the Hurrians 2. Eisenbrauns. Winona Lake, Ind. 1987: 3-68.
- "Remarks on KTU 1:96." Studi epigrapfici e linguistici 5 (1988): 13-24.
- "The Geographical and Political Structure of the Ebla Empire." H. Hauptman and H. Waetzoldt, eds. Wirtschaft und Gesellschaft von Ebla: Akten der Internationalen Tagung, Heidelberg 4.-7. November 1986. Heidelberger Studien zum Alten Orient 2. Heidelberg Orientverlag. Heidelberg. 1988: 139-58.
- "The Origins of the Samaritans: Critical Examination of the Evidence." S. Shaath, ed. Studies in the History and Archaeology of Palestine. Proceedings of the First International Symposium on Palestine Antiquities, III. Aleppo University Press. Aleppo. 1988: 9-53.
- "Toponymy of Ebla and Ethnohistory of Northern Syria: A Preliminary Survey". Journal of the American Oriental Society 108 (1988): 545-55.
- "The Location of ҫaşurā of the Mari Texts." Maarav 7 (1991): 51-65.
- "An Outline of the History of Ebla (Part I)." Eblaitica 3 (1992): 3-82.
- "Sparagmos, Omophagia, and Ecstatic Prophecy at Mari." Ugarit Forschungen 24 (1992): 1-2.
- "The Date of the Destruction of Palace G at Ebla." M.W. Chavalas and J.L. Hayes, eds. New Horizons in the Study of Ancient Syria. Biblioteca Mesopotamica 25. Undena Publications. Malibu, Calif. 1992: 23-39.
- "The North Mesopotamian Kingdom of Ilānşurā." In G.D. Young, ed. Mari in Retrospect: Fifty Years of Mari and Mari Studies. Eisenbrauns. Winona Lake, Ind.1992: 1-33.
- "La Topographie du royaume d'Ougarit." M. Yon, M. Sznycer and P. Bordreuil, eds. Le Pays d'Ougarit autour de 1200 av. J.-C. Ras Shamra-Ougarit XI. Actes du Colloque International, Paris, 28 juin – 1 juillet 1993. Editions Recherche sur les Civilisations. Paris. 1995: 55-69.
- "Overland Trade Roots in Ancient Western Asia." J.M. Sasson, ed. Civilizations of the Ancient Near East. Charles Scribner's Sons. New York. 1995: 1401-20.
- "Some Unrecognized North Syrian Toponyms in Egyptian Sources." J. Coleson and V. Mathews, eds. Go to the Land I will Show You: Studies in Honor of Dwight W. Young. Eisenbrauns. Winona Lake, Ind. 1996: 213-41.
- "Who Was the King of the Hurrian Troops at the Siege of Emar?" M.W. Chavalas, ed. Emar: The History, Religion, and Culture of a Bronze Age Town in Syria. CDL Press. Bethesda, Md. 1996: 25-56.
- "Review Article of A. Archi, P. Piacentini and F. Pomponio. I nomi di luogo dei testi di Ebla (ARES 2)". Journal of the American Oriental Society 116 (1997): 332-38.
- "The Toponyms of Ebla." Journal of the American Oriental Society 117/2 (1997):332-38.
- "The Hapiru in the Amarna Texts: Basic Points of Controversy." Ugarit-Forschungen 31 (1999): 31-50.
- "A Reconstruction of the History of Ebla" (part 2). Eblaitica 4 (2002): 57-195. 303

== Sources ==
- Aelian (1971) [First published 1958]. Scholfield, A. F. (ed.). On the Characteristics of Animals. Loeb Classical Library. ISBN 0-674-99491-4.
- Alroey, Gur (Fall 2011). ""Zionism without Zion"? Territorialist Ideology and the Zionist Movement, 1882–1956". Jewish Social Studies. 18 (1): 1–32.
- Astour, Michael (1965). Hellenosemitica: An Ethnic and Cultural Study in West Semitic Impact On Mycenaean Greece (PDF). Brill Publishers.
- Berlinerblau, Jacques (1999). Heresy in the University: The Black Athena Controversy and the Responsibilities of American Intellectuals. Rutgers University Press. ISBN 978-081352588-4.
- Bernal, Martin (1987). Black Athena. Vol. 1. Free Association Books. ISBN 0-946960-56-9.
- Boardman, John (March 1966). "An Orient Wave: Review of Hellenosemitica". The Classical Review. 16 (1): 86–88. doi:10.1017/S0009840X00320480. S2CID 161107104.
- Burkert, Walter (1987) [First published 1985]. Greek Religion: Archaic and Classical. Basil Blackwell. ISBN 0-631-15624-0.
- Burkert, Walter (1995) [First published 1992]. The Orientalizing Revolution: Near Eastern Influence on Greek Culture in the Early Archaic Age. Harvard University Press. ISBN 0-674-64363-1.
- "Dr.Michael Astour Named Professor of Yiddish Culture at Brandeis University". Jewish Telegraphic Agency. April 21, 1960.
- Edwards, Ruth B. (1979). Kadmos the Phoenician: A Study in Greek Legends and the Mycenaean Age. Adolf M. Hakkert. ISBN 978-0-902-56079-6.
- Gordon, Cyrus (1962). Before the Bible: The Common Background of Greek and Hebrew Civilisations. Collins.
- Jobling, James A. (2010). Helm Dictionary of Scientific Bird Names (PDF). Christopher Helm. ISBN 978-1-408-12501-4.
- Mandelstam, Nadezhda (1975). Hope Against Hope. Penguin Books.
- McGregor, Malcolm F. (January 1, 1966). Hope Against Hope. Vol. 71. The American Historical Review. pp. 521–522. doi:10.1086/ahr/71.2.521.
- Pollard, John (1977). Birds in Greek Life and Myth. Thames and Hudson.
- Purvis, James D. (1966). "Review of Hellenosemitica". Journal of Near Eastern Studies. 27 (2): 154–155. doi:10.1086/371955.
- Weingartner, James J. (May 21, 2015). "Michael C. Astour: A Biographical Essay". SIUE Faculty Research, Scholarship, and Creative Activity. 2.
- West, M. L. (1997). The East Face of Herlicon: West Asiatic Elements in Greek Poetry and Myth. Clarendon Press. ISBN 0-19-815-042-3.
- Young, Gordon; Chavalas, Mark; Averbeck, Richard, eds. (1997). Crossing Boundaries and Linking Horizons: Studies in Honor of Michael C. Astour on His 80th Birthday. CDL Press. ISBN 978-188305332-1.
