= Hasankeyf =

- Municipality
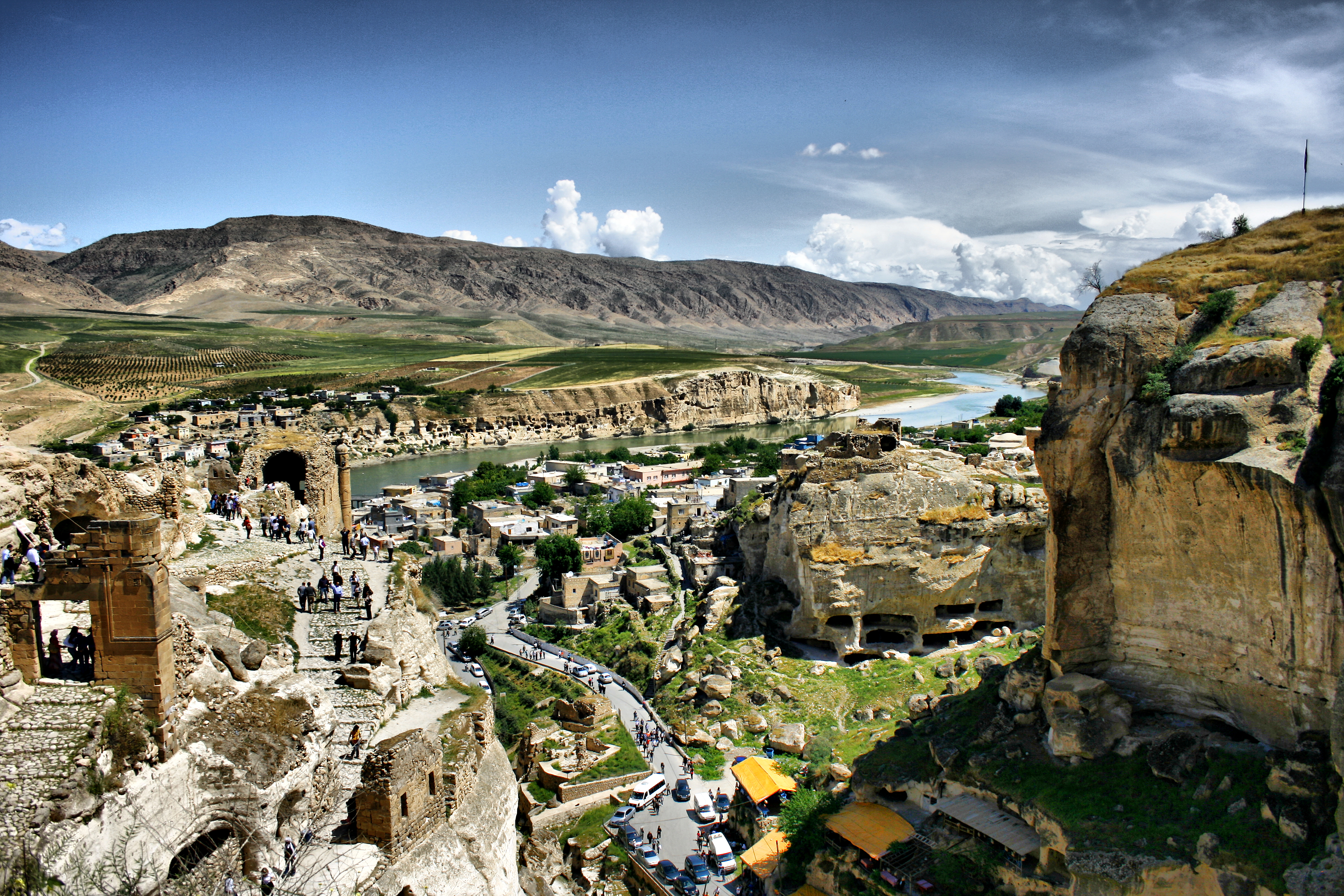
- View of the town from Hasankeyf Castle in 2010

- Logo

- Location within Turkey
- Country: Turkey
- Province: Batman
- District: Hasankeyf
- Established: 18th century BC?

Government
  - Mayor: Hamit Tutuş (AKP)
- Population (2021): 4,329
- Time zone: UTC+3 (TRT)

Hasankeyf (Note: Arabic: حصن كيفا, romanized: Ḥiṣn Kayfa'; Kurdish: Heskîf; Armenian: Հասանքեյֆ; Greek: Κιφας, romanized: Kifas; Latin: Cepha; Syriac: ܚܣܢܐ ܕܟܐܦܐ, romanized: Ḥesno d-Kifo) is a town located along the Tigris, in the Hasankeyf District, Batman Province, Turkey. It was declared a natural conservation area by Turkey in 1981.

Despite local and international objections, the city and its archaeological sites have been flooded as part of the Ilısu Dam project. By 1 April 2020, water levels reached an elevation of 498.2 meters, covering the whole town.

The town had a population of 4,329 in 2021.

== Toponymy ==
Hasankeyf was an ancient settlement that has borne many names from a variety of cultures during its history. The variety of these names is compounded by the many ways that non-Latin alphabets such as Syriac and Arabic can be transliterated. Underlying these many names is much continuity between cultures in the basic identification of the site.

The city of Ilānṣurā mentioned in the Akkadian and Northwest Semitic texts of the Mari Tablets (1800–1750 BC) may possibly be Hasankeyf, although other sites have also been proposed. By the Roman period, the fortified town was known in Latin as Cephe, Cepha or Ciphas, a name that appears to derive from the Syriac word ܟܐܦܐ (kefa or kifo), meaning "rock". As the eastern and western portions of the Roman Empire split around AD 330, Κιφας (Kiphas) became formalized as the Greek name for this Byzantine bishopric.

Following the Arab conquest of 640, the town became known under the Arabic name حصن كيفا (Ḥiṣn Kayfa). "Hisn" means "fortress" in Arabic, so the name overall means "rock fortress". Western reports about the town before the 20th century refer to it by various names that are transliterated from Arabic or Ottoman Turkish. The most popular of these were Hisn Kaifa and Hisn Kayfa, although a wide variety of others are used including Ḥiṣn Kaifā, Ḥiṣn Kayfā, Ḥiṣn Kayfâ, Ḥiṣn Kīfā, Ḥiṣn Kîfâ, Hisn Kayf, Husn Kayfa, Hassan-Keyf, Hosnkeif and Husunkeïf. Two early Armenian historians list additional names for the town: Harsenkev (Armenian: Հարսնքվ) is recorded by Matthew of Edessa (Mesrob Eretz) and Kentzy is recorded by P. Lucas Ingigian.

As part of Atatürk's Reforms in the 1920s and '30s, many place names were modified to more Turkish-sounding forms and the town's official name was changed to Hasankeyf. This version appears occasionally in foreign reports in the mid 20th-century but only becomes prevalent after about 1980.

== History ==
=== Middle Bronze Age (Ilānṣurā?) ===
During the Middle Bronze Age the area around Hasankeyf was likely part of the Hurrian kingdoms. The Akkadian and Northwest Semitic texts of the Mari Tablets (1800–1750 BC) refer to Ilānṣurā, an important walled city on a large river. Ilānṣurā has been tentatively identified with Hasankeyf, although several locations in northeast Syria have also been proposed.

=== Late Bronze Age ===
By the 14th century BC, the Hasankeyf area was within the Hurrian kingdom of Mitanni. Between the 9th and 7th centuries BC it was part of the Neo-Assyrian Empire, and by the mid-6th century it was part of the Median empire.

=== Roman and Byzantine empires ===
In Roman Empire times, Hasankeyf (known as Kepha, Cephe, Cepha or Ciphas) was a base for legionaries on the frontier with the Sasanian Empire of Persia.

For a time the town became the capital of the Roman province of Arzanene, although Nisibis was the headquarters of the Dux Mesopotamiae. Constantius II (324–361) built a fort at Kepha, but it is unclear whether this was on the current citadel site. The existence of a Roman bridge across the Tigris at Hasankeyf has been viewed as "highly probable" by one scholar who speculates that (like the later bridge) it may have had "a wooden superstructure based on piers of masonry and natural stone". However, none of the remaining structure of the bridge appears to date from Roman times.

The balance of power in the region shifted significantly in 363. Following the death of the emperor Julian at the Battle of Samarra, his successor Jovian was forced to surrender to the Persian King Shapur II the eastern provinces of Arzanene, Moxoene, Zabdicene, Corduene and Rehimene. This included 15 castles, along with the cities of Singara and Nisibis, but not their inhabitants, and the fortress of Castra Maurorum. While Kiphas had been administered as part of Arzanene up to 363, it lay on the south bank of the Tigris and was not surrendered to the Sasanians. Before the treaty, the fort at Kiphas had been on the border between Roman territory and the Armenian vassal kingdom of Arzanene. Now the border with Persia ran along the Tigris and the legionnaires at Kiphas were stationed right on it. Their role was chiefly to protect the Tur Abdin massif and the approach through it to the Roman province of Sophanene from attack by the Persians in Arzanene.

Recording the situation at the end of the fourth century, the Notitia Dignitatum identifies Cepha as the seat of the commander of the Legio II Parthica. The bishop of Cepha is recorded as attending the Council of Chalcedon in October 451, which implies the settlement must have become a sizeable town by that time. As the use of Latin began to wane in the Eastern Roman Empire, Κιφας (Kiphas) became formalized as the Greek name for the Byzantine bishopric.

Rescue excavations from 2005 to 2008 uncovered evidence of the base of a Roman gateway to the upper city, a row of shops from the late Roman period, and Roman floor and wall mosaics.

By the sixth century, the Persians were mounting frequent attacks on the eastern border of the Byzantine empire. As a consequence, the Byzantines built a great number of military installations in the region during the early and mid-sixth century. Despite this the Persians seized the opportunity of a Byzantine civil war to attack the eastern provinces, in what became the Byzantine–Sasanian War of 602–628. Early in the conflict they occupied Kiphas along with Mardin, Dara and probably the rest of the Tur Abdin, and these were held for most of the rest of the war. The treaty that concluded the war restored Kiphas to Byzantine control, but the gain was to prove short-lived. Writing between about 600 and 610, the Byzantine geographer George of Cyprus mentions Cepha as a fortress in the Mesopotamia section of his Descriptio Orbis Romani.

=== Muslim conquest ===
By the 630s, Muslim Arab forces had conquered large parts of Mesopotamia, Syria and Iran. Kiphas appears most likely to have been captured during the Muslim conquest of Armenia in 640, shortly after the conquest of Nisibis. An account from this period provides the earliest mention of any bridge across the Tigris at this site.

Over the subsequent five centuries, the town was ruled by Arab dynasties under the name Hisn Kayfa, first by the Umayyad and Abbasid caliphates and later by semi-autonomous Hamdanid and Marwanid rulers.

Fatima, the Kurdish mother of the Hamdanid ruler Abu Taghlib, took control of the town in c. 900 A.D.

=== Artuqid period (1102–1232) ===
In the 11th century, Seljuk Turks and their Turkmen and Oghuz allies moved into Western Armenia, culminating in the Seljuk defeat of Byzantine forces at the Battle of Manzikert in 1071. Victory at Manzikert quickly resulted in Seljuk forces controlling large parts of Anatolia and northern Mesopotamia. The Seljuk sultan Barkiyāruq granted Hisn Kayfa as a iqtâ' to the Artuqids in 1101/1102.

In 1104, Joscelin I of Edessa, at that time the count of Turbessel, was imprisoned at Hisn Kayfa by Sökmen after he was captured at the Battle of Harran along with his kinsman Baldwin II of Jerusalem, then count of Edessa. Baldwin was imprisoned at Mosul by the Seljuk atabeg Jikirmish. After the death of Jikirmish in 1107 and the payment of a significant ransom, Baldwin II and Joscelin I were released. Coincidentally, both men later became prisoners of Belek Ghazi in 1122/1123.

Control of trade along the Diyarbakır–Mosul road paralleling the Tigris, and north–south between Lake Van and the Euphrates generated prosperity for the Artuqids and ensured their power in the region. Consequently, the existence of a reliable river crossing for goods and people was a priority, and the Artuqids built a bridge across the Tigris at some time between 1147 and 1172.

This period was something of a golden age for Hisn Kayfa, with the Artuqids and their successors, the Ayyubids, building the Small Palace and the Great Palace as well as the Tigris bridge. The infrastructure, location and significance of the city helped increase trade and made Hisn Kayfa a staging post on the Silk Road.

In April 1204, the Artuqid emir al-Salih Mahmud, who controlled both Amida and Hisn Kayfa, joined with al-Ashraf, the Ayyubid ruler of Harran, and princes from Mayafaraqin, Cizre, Sinjar and Irbil to rout the army of Nur ad-Din Arslan Shah I, the Zengid ruler of Mosul, in a battle near Nusaybin. In the second half of 1204/1205, al-Salih Mahmud also lent his forces to help al-Ashraf attack Harput, which was controlled by another branch of the Artuqids.

By 1229/1230, al-Salih's successor, Rukn al-Din Madud, was allied with the Khwarazmshah Jalal al-Din Mangburni against the Ayyubid rulers al-Ashraf and al-Kamil.

By 1232, control of Amida and Hisn Kayfa had passed to the Artuqid prince al-Masʿud. Troubled by the alliance with Khwarazm, al-Ashraf and al-Kamil resolved to attack Amida, and used as a pretext reports of al-Masʿud's misrule, including his abuse of local women. The combined Ayyubid armies, swelled by contributions from many of their vassals, besieged Amida on October 1232. By 18 October 1232, al-Masʿud surrendered Amida to al-Kamil. Al-Kamil then sent his brother, al-Ashraf, along with al-Muzaffar Ghazi of Mayafaraqin to Hisn Kayfa to obtain its surrender. Even though, the Ayyubid force had brought with them al-Masʿud as a captive, the garrison at Hisn Kayfa resisted for some time, and the city was captured only in Safar 630/November 1232.

=== Ayyubids and Mongols (1232–1462) ===
Once the citadel fell to the Ayyubid forces, al-Kamil immediately installed his 27-year-old son, as-Salih Ayyub, as governor of both Amida and Hisn Kayfa, beginning the period of Ayyubid rule over the Diyar Bakr.

Ayyubid rule of Hisn Kayfa was insecure almost from the start. During 1235, the Rum Seljuk forces of 'Alā ad-Dīn Kayqubād had advanced into Southeast Anatolia, capturing Harput, Urfa and Harran. In Dhu-l-Hijja 632/August 1235, they laid siege to Amida, but were unsuccessful in capturing the city and consequently did not advance as far as Hisn Kayfa.

Only five years after Hisn Kayfa was captured by the Ayyubids, it had already become a pawn in the dynasty's power struggles. By 634 AH (1236/1237 CE) al-Ashraf had become resentful of his brother al-Kamil's ill-concealed ambition. al-Ashraf recruited the rulers of Aleppo and Homs to his faction and sent ambassadors to the court of Rum Seljuk sultan 'Alā ad-Dīn Kayqubād to propose an alliance. When they arrived at the Seljuk court they discovered that Kayqubād had died on 4 Shawwal 634/31 May 1237, and they now had to deal with his son, Ghiyath ad-Din Kaykhusrau II. The Middle East historian R. Stephen Humphreys speculates that Kaykhusrau was offered control of Amida and Hisn Kayfa in return for joining the alliance. Although al-Ashraf had assembled a formidable alliance against his brother, he was unable to use this to engage al-Kamil's forces as he was already ill by the time of the negotiations with the Seljuks, and he died on 4 Muharram 635/28 August 1237. His rival, al-Kamil, died on 6 March 1238, and the Ayyubid domain was thrown into fresh turmoil.

Al-Kamil had bequeathed control of the Jazira to as-Salih Ayyub, who had been emir of Hisn Kayfa, and named his younger brother al-Adil as his heir in Egypt. In his new role as sultan, as-Salih Ayyub installed his own young son, al-Muazzam Turanshah as prince of Hisn Kayfa in 636 AH (1238/1239 CE), with one of his closest advisers, Husam al-Din, as Turanshah's atabeg. As-Salih Ayyub, meanwhile, gathered an army to take Damascus and challenge al-Adil's rule over Egypt. By June 1240 as-Salih Ayyub's soldiers had captured al-Adil and as-Salih became paramount ruler of the Ayyubid possessions.

It appears that as-Salih's son al-Muazzam Turanshah remained prince of Hisn Kayfa from 1238 until 1249. When as-Salih Ayyub died suddenly on 12 November 1249, Turanshah had to be recalled in a hurry to take control of the Ayyubid empire. As-Salih's widow, Shajar al-Durr, dispatched a special embassy to bring her son to Egypt. Turanshah had left Hisn Kayfa with this party by 18 December 1249, heading for Anah and Damascus.

Al-Muwaḥḥid ʿAbd Allāh succeeded his father, Turanshah, as ruler of Hisn Kayfa. Although his father ruled Egypt for barely a year and was killed during the Mamluk takeover, al-Muwaḥḥid ʿAbd Allāh ruled Hisn Kayfa for more than three decades, from 647 AH (1249/1250 CE) to 693 AH (1293/1294 CE), and was essentially the founder of the local Ayyubid dynasty. Although little remains standing from this prosperous period of the town's history, there is a detailed contemporary first-hand account by the topographer ʿIzz ad-Dīn Ibn Shaddād, whose last visit was in 657 AH (1258/1259 CE). He lists many buildings in the lower town, including a Dār as-Salṭana (near the bridge), a mosque, three medreses, four hammams, tombs, caravanserais and bazaars. At the citadel, Ibn Shaddād mentions another mosque, an open square, and fields to grow enough grain "to feed the inhabitants from year to year". The German historian of Islamic art Michael Meinecke notes that almost none of the buildings that Ibn Shaddād describes can be identified in present-day Hasankeyf, and attributes that to neglect following the subsequent Mongol invasions and political instability.

In 1255, the great khan Möngke charged his brother Hulagu with leading a massive Mongol army to conquer or destroy the remaining Muslim states in southwestern Asia. Hulagu first besieged Baghdad, which was captured on 13 February 1258 and destroyed. He conquered Aleppo on 24 January 1260, and the Nestorian Christian Mongol general Kitbuqa Noyan took Damascus on 1 March. It seemed inevitable that all of the region's cities, including Hisn Kayfa, would fall to the Mongols, and indeed most of them did. Hulagu's plan appears to have been to proceed to Palestine and Egypt. But while he was in Aleppo in the spring of 1260, he received word that the great khan Möngke had died the previous summer (on 11 August 1259). While Hulagu did not expect to succeed his elder brother, there was a struggle between two of his other brothers, Kubilai and Ariq Böke, for control of the Mongol empire, and Hulagu decided it was wise to withdraw to Tabriz to await the resolution of this conflict.

On 23 Rabiʿ II 658/7 April 1260, Mayafaraqin fell to Hulagu's forces, presumably during their retreat towards Ahlat and Tabriz, leaving Mardin and Hisn Kayfa as the only cities outside his control in the Jazira. Mardin was captured by the end of 1260, but Hisn Kayfa appears to have escaped a concerted assault because it controlled only a minor trade route and could simply be bypassed. Nevertheless, it seems that al-Muwaḥḥid decided to submit to being a Mongol vassal at about this time. While most of the Diyar Bakr came under direct control of the Mongol governor or Mosul, both Ayyubid Hisn Kayfa and Artukid Mardin were allowed to remain as vassal states.

By 665 AH (1266/1267 CE) the Mamluk Baybars was in power in Egypt, and represented the primary force opposing the Mongols, now led by Hulagu's son Abaqa Khan. Baybars sent two eunuchs as emissaries to al-Muwaḥḥid to try to persuade him to abandon the Mongols, and apparently the emir of Hisn Kayfa agreed. However, the envoys were caught by a local Mongol commander as they attempted to carry al-Muwaḥḥid's reply to Baybars. Abaqa had the envoys executed, and al-Muwaḥḥid was banished to the Ilkhanate court for seven years. By 672 AH (1273/1274 CE) al-Muwaḥḥid had returned as the nominal ruler of Hisn Kayfa, where he remained until his death, variously reported as having occurred in 682 AH (1283/1284 CE) or 693 AH (1293/1294 CE).

Mongol rule of the region continued until 1335, and this badly damaged both trade and agriculture, which had been the sources of the region's prosperity. The impact was felt hardest between 1260 and 1315, and traders essentially avoided the region because of ongoing war between Mamluk and Mongol forces. In 1315, the Il-Khanate and the Mamluks signed a treaty and trade restarted. This proved to be a boon for Hisn Kayfa. The previous primary routes across the region—through Cizre and Nusaybin, and through Mayafaraqin and Amida (Diyarbakır)—both failed to attract many traders, and a new route from Iran to Aleppo through Siirt, Hisn Kayfa and Mardin took their place.

The economy of the region gradually shrank during the 14th and early 15th centuries, according to historian Thomas Alexander Sinclair, but this probably did not cause any population decline in the cities of Mardin or Hisn Kayfa, where building continued uninterrupted. Several other cities in the region, such as Mayafaraqin, Arzan, Nusaybin and Dara shrank or disappeared. After the breakup of the Ilkhanate, an Artukid force waged war against the Ayyubids of Hisn Kayfa in 1334, but were decisively defeated, with the Ayyubids gaining their possessions on the left bank of the Tigris River.

During the 14th century, the emirs of Hisn Kayfa also controlled the interior of the Tur Abdin and the castle of Haytham (in the Tur Abdin). In 1334/5 al-Adil Hisn Kayfa seized control over Mayafaraqin, which probably had been governed by a Mongol vassal up to that time. Soon after, Al-Adil installed Zeyd, a Kurdish chief of the Zraki (or Zirki) tribe previously based at the castle of Boşat (the present-day village of Boyunlu, in Silvan district), as his client ruler at Mayafaraqin. It seems that this was in payback for Zeyd's assistance in helping Hisn Kayfa repulse an attack by the Artuqid sultan of Mardin.

The Hisn Kayfa emirs also attacked and captured Siirt soon after the Mongol withdrawal. They fought for control of Siirt with forces from Arzan, and al-Ashraf of Hisn Kayfa succeeded in capturing it in 1341/42.

In 1349/50, the Kara Koyunlu rose to dominate the region of the Diyar Bakr, and local princes such as those at Hisn Kayfa, paid tribute to them. Also in 1349/50, the emir of Hisn Kayfa, al-Adil, attacked Azran, breaching its walls and destroying the town in order to get revenge on the local ruler. After this victory the town was abandoned and al-Adil bestowed control of the surrounding region on a Kurdish family.

In the early and middle 15th century, Aq Qoyunlu Turkmen forces attacked Hisn Kayfa several times, but Ayyubid rulers managed to retain control of the city and the city prospered until very end of the 15th century.

In the 14th century, the Ayyubids rebuilt the castle of Hisn Kayfa which served as their stronghold as vassals of consecutively Mamluks and Dulkadirids until they were supplanted by the Ottoman Empire in the early 16th century.

=== Aq Qoyunlu period (1462–1501) ===
During the second half of the 15th century, Hisn Kayfa was still governed by the last remaining Ayyubid dynasty, who owed allegiance to the Turkmen Aq Qoyunlu confederation. The Aq Qoyunlu dynasty was headed by Uzun Hassan from 1452 to 1478.

Uzun Hassan's initial capital was at Amida (modern Diyarbakır), which he gained from his brother Jihangir in 1452. From there, Uzun Hassan embarked on a campaign of expanding his territory at the expense of the rival Kara Koyunlu dynasty. Hasankeyf was one of the first towns to acknowledge Uzun Hassan's suzerainty, in an agreement signed by the Ayyubid emir in 1455. While Uzun Hassan managed to extend his influence throughout much of the Diyar Bakr and Jazira during the 1450s, the Ayyubid emir of Hasankeyf rebelled in 1460, attempting to take control of Siirt. Uzun Hassan responded by attacking Hasankeyf in 1461; he finally captured the town in 1462 after a six-month siege. It seems that Uzun Hassan then appointed his son Zeynel as governor of Hasankeyf.

Aq Qoyunlu territory expanded further following their defeat of the Kara Koyunlu in Iran (1467–69), and Uzun Hassan moved his capital to Tabriz. However, Hassan followed up these successes with a disastrous campaign against the Ottoman Empire. Hassan's army of light cavalry was routed by Mehmed II's Ottoman forces, armed with rifles and cannon, at the Battle of Otlukbeli near Erzincan in August 1473. While Uzun Hassan survived, his son Zeynel Bey was killed in battle. In commemoration, the Mausoleum of Zeynel Bey was erected in Hasankeyf in about 1474 on the orders of either Uzun Hassan, or Zeynel's elder brother, Khalil. The shrine is currently moved to a new location to avoid inundation by the rising waters of the nearby dam.

=== Safavid Empire (1504–1514/1517) ===
In 1504, during the reign of king (shah) Ismail I (r. 1501–1525) the Safavids founded the short-lived Diyarbakr Province, which consisted of six districts, including Hasankeyf.

=== Soran Emirate (1830s) ===
In the early 19th century, Hasankeyf was affected by the military campaigns of Mir Muhammad of Rawanduz, the Kurdish emir of Rawanduz. During his westward expansion after the conquest of Bahdinan, Mir Muhammad launched expeditions deep into Diyarbekir Province, reaching towns such as Hasankeyf, Mardin, and Nusaybin. These campaigns formed part of the Soran-Ottoman conflict and contributed to instability across the region during the 1830s.

=== Ottoman Empire and Turkish Republic ===
In 1514/1517, the Ottoman Empire took Hasankeyf and the rest of the Safavid Diyarbakr Province. In his 1614 History of the World, Walter Raleigh places "the Citie of Hasan-Cepha, otherwise Fortis Petra", upstream from the island of Eden, which he believed lay in the Tigris, based on his reading of Andreas Masius's De Paradiso Commentarius.

== Demographics ==
While villages surrounding the town are almost exclusively inhabited by Kurds, the native Muslim population of the town used to be composed of Arabs, speaking a dialect of North Mesopotamian Arabic that neither resembles that of Siirt nor Midyat. Until the 1980s, Armenian, Arameans and Arab Christian families lived in the cave houses by the river. Many of these families immigrated to France, Germany, Sweden and Switzerland as the Turkish government's conflict with the PKK escalated during the 1980s. During the same time period, Kurds from nearby villages started settling in the town. Arabic is still spoken in the city.

== Archaeological sites ==
Hasankeyf is rich in history throughout the ages and aside from the sites below, thousands of caves exist in the cliffs that surround the city. Many of the caves are multi-storied and have their own water supply. Churches and mosques were also carved into the cliffs and numerous ancient cemeteries exist throughout the area.

- The Old Tigris Bridge – Built in 1116 by the Artuqid Sultan Fahrettin Karaaslan, it replaced an older bridge. The bridge over the Tigris River is considered to be the largest from the Medieval Period. Support for the bridge was built with wood in case the bridge had to be removed in order to prevent an attack. Because of this, two piles and some foundation work are all that exist of the bridge today.
- The Citadel – This structure sits 100 metres (330 ft) above the Tigris River, overlooking Hasankeyf. The Citadel has likely been used as a dwelling place for centuries.

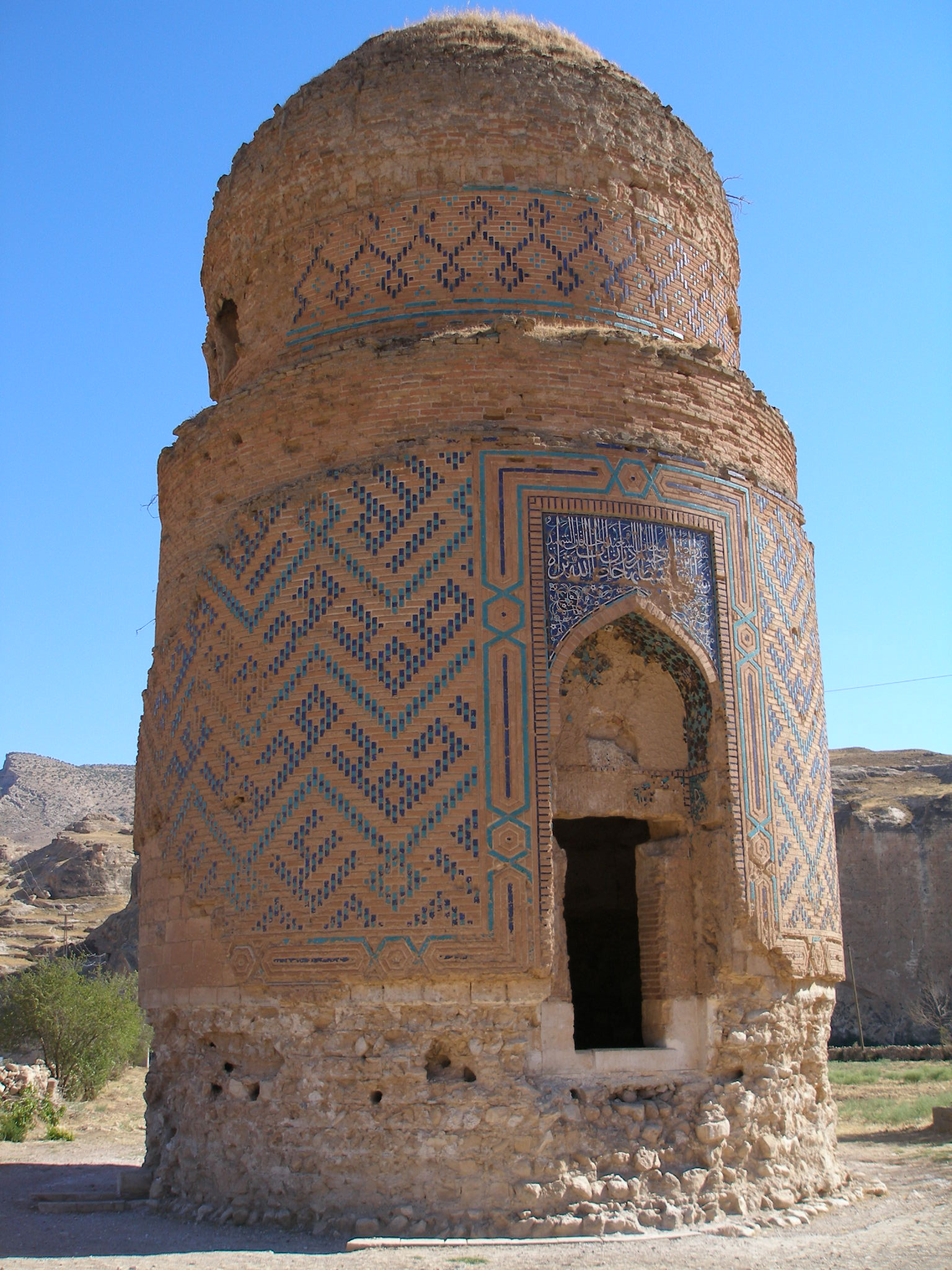
Mausoleum of Zeynel Bey, son of Sultan Uzun Hasan (Hasan the Tall) of the Aq Qoyunlu dynasty, or White Sheep Turkomans (1378–1508)

- Small Palace – This palace was built by the Ayyubids and overlooks Hasankeyf as it sits on a cliff.
- Grand Mosque – With no inscriptions remaining, it is not exactly known when and by whom the mosque was built. However, it is thought that it dates from the period of the Ayyubids who have subsequently restored the mosque in the years 1327, 1394 and 1396.
- Great Palace – The palace was built by the Artukids; it occupies an area of 2,350 metres (7,710 ft) and has an associated rectangular tower that may have been a watchtower.
- El Rizk Mosque – The Mosque was built in 1409 by the Ayyubid sultan Süleyman and stands on the bank of the Tigris River. The mosque also has a minaret that has remained intact.
- Süleyman Mosque – This mosque was built by Sultan Süleyman and is all but destroyed except for a minaret. Süleyman's grave is missing from the site as well.
- Koc Mosque – The mosque is located east of the Süleyman Mosque and was likely built before the 15th century.
- Kizlar Mosque – Located east of the Koc Mosque, the Kizlar mosque was also likely from the Ayyubid period as well. The section of the structure which is used as a mosque today was a mausoleum in the past, containing grave remnants.
- Imam Abdullah Tomb – This cube-shaped tomb lies west of the new bridge in Hasankeyf and is the tomb of Imam Abdullah. Abdullah was the grandson of Cafer-i Tayyar, (Jaʿfar ibn Abī Ṭālib (Arabic: جَعْفَر ابْن أَبِي طَالِب) cousin of the prophet Mohammad. The tomb is dated to the 14th century and an epitaph on the tomb states that the tomb was restored in the Ayyubid period.
- Zeynel Bey Mausoleum – Named after Zeynel Bey, this mausoleum is opposite Hasankeyf on the Tigris River. Zeynel Bey was the son of Uzun Hassan ruler of the Akkoyunlu Dynasty which ruled over Hasankeyf in the 15th century. Zeynel Bey died in battle in 1473, and was buried in this circular brick mausoleum glazed with navy blue and turquoise tiles built by architect Pir Hasan. The building resembles in its architectural style mausoleums in Central Asia. This shrine has been relocated to the new Hasankeyf Cultural Park in 2017, set aside for historical artifacts impacted by the Ilısu Dam construction.
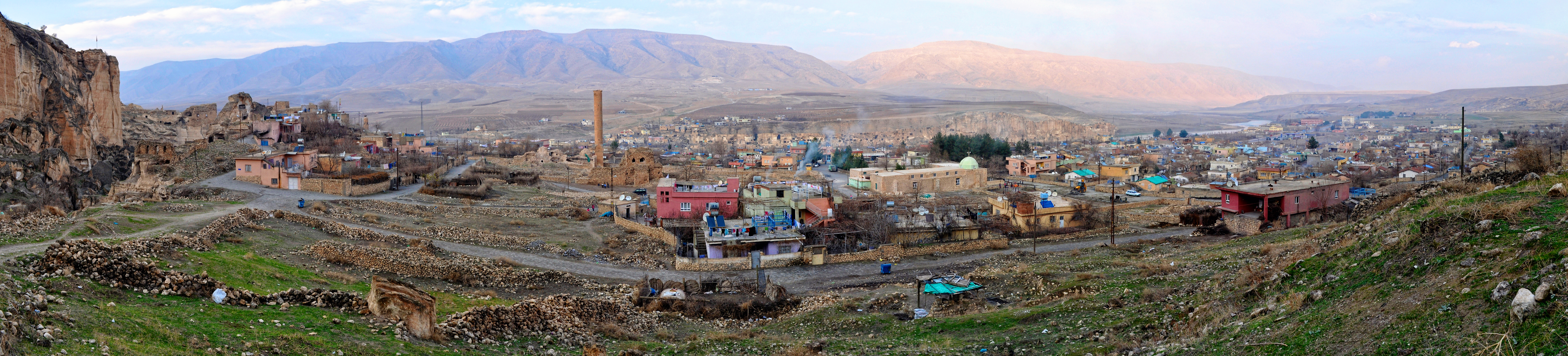
A panoramic photo of Hasankeyf with the Tigris River in the background, in 2011

== Ilısu Dam impact ==
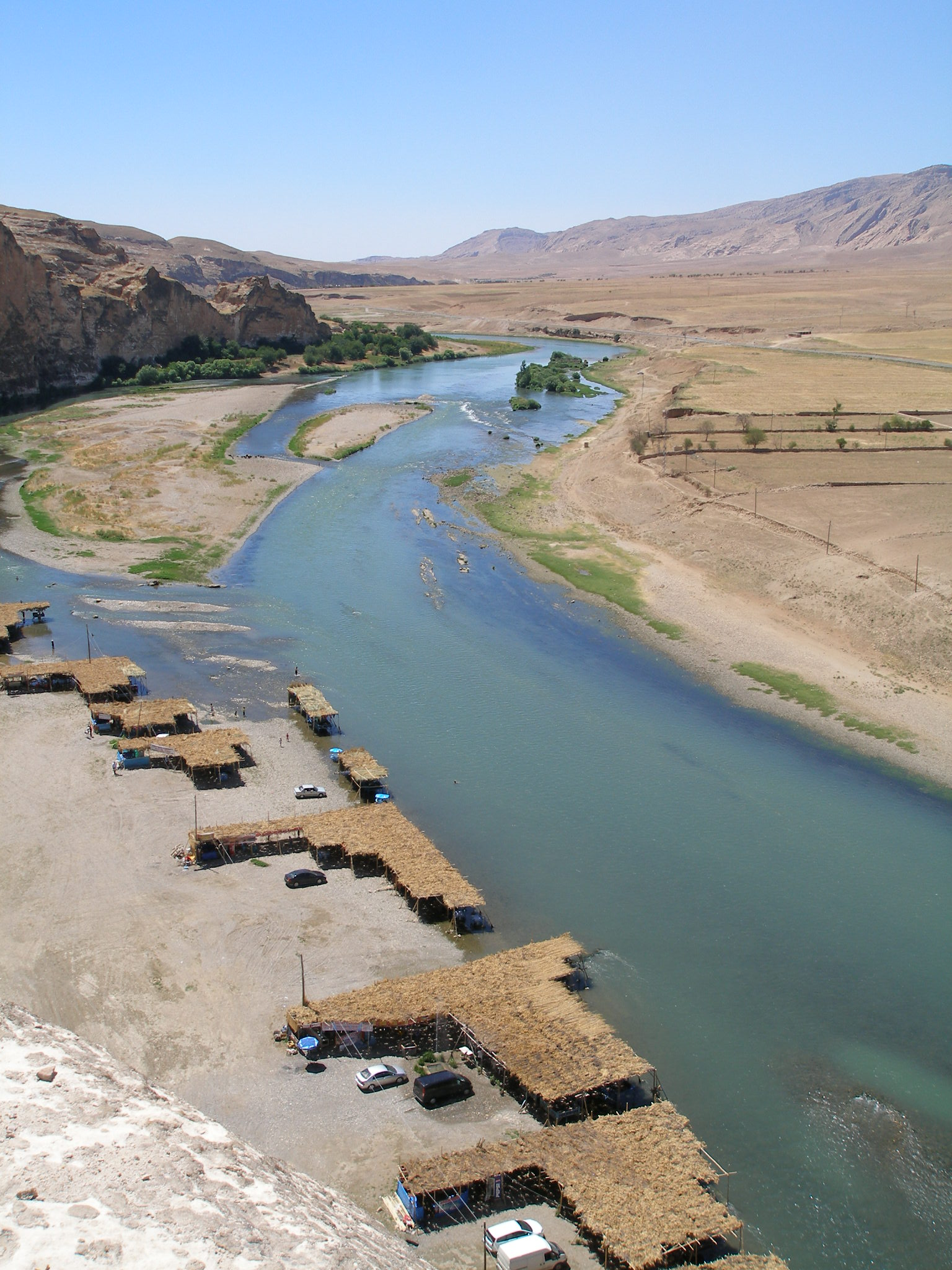
View of the Tigris River in Hasankeyf, seen from the Citadel, in 2008. Reed covered restaurants are visible along the river.

With its history that spans nine civilizations, the archaeological and religious significance of Hasankeyf is considerable. Many of the city's historical treasures were inundated as construction of the Ilısu Dam is completed. These include the ornate mosques, Islamic tombs and cave churches. Up to 80,000 people in Hasankeyf were displaced. Some of these people were moved to a new city above the waterline.

There was considerable local opposition to the scheme, and calls for Hasankeyf to be recognised and protected as an UNESCO World Heritage Site.

According to the Buğday Association, based in Turkey, Ms. Huriye Küpeli, the prefect of Hasankeyf, the Swiss ambassador to Turkey and representatives of the Swiss led consortium of contractors for the dam project have suggested what they believe to be a suitable nearby spot for moving the historical heritage of Hasankeyf, an operation for which the Turkish Ministry of Culture pledged to provide 30 million euros, however current reports indicate that only eight historical monuments have been moved.

The threat of the Ilısu Dam project prompted the World Monuments Fund to list the city on its 2008 Watch List of the 100 Most Endangered Sites in the world. While this listing has created more awareness of the project, it has failed to prompt the Ilısu Consortium to develop alternate plans that are sympathetic to this site of exceptional historical and cultural significance.

In December 2008, following pressure from campaign groups, export credit insurers in Austria, Germany and Switzerland announced suspending their support for the project amid concern about its environmental and cultural impact and gave the Turkish government 180 days to meet standards set by the World Bank. These standards were 153 requirements on environmental protection, resettlement of villages, protection of cultural heritage, and resource management with neighbouring states. As Turkey did not fulfil any of them, the three ECAs indicated in a joint press release issued on 7 July 2009 that they withdrew from the project. Shortly after, in another joint press release issued on the same day, the three banks (Société Générale, UniCredit and DekaBank) financing the Ilısu Dam project also stated – in line with the decision of the ECAs – that the export credit granted by the three banks for the construction of the Ilısu Dam would no longer be available.

This meant that Turkey has had to finance the proposed project with internal sources. The Minister of Forestry and Environment, Veysel Eroğlu, on a number of platforms, declared that the government would build the Dam despite all obstacles - and objections. That the Ilısu Dam has become a "project of honour" for the Turkish State has been made very clear by Eroğlu. "We do not need their money. We will construct this dam at any cost." Since 2009 the construction has proceeded with the financial support of Turkish banks; Garanti Bankası and Akbank. As a result of the resettlement program for the population, many residents of Hasankeyf moved to a Yeni Hasankeyf (New Hasankeyf) on a hill which was to be at the shore of the dam reservoir after the construction of the dam is terminated. By July 2020, the ancient town was completely submerged in the waters of the dam.

== Climate ==
The local climate is moderated by the proximity of the Tigris river. It makes the winters milder, with lows of 6 °C (43 °F). Temperatures in summer can reach 43 °C (109 °F), and the yearly average temperature is 25 °C (77 °F).

== See also ==
- Emirate of Hasankeyf
- Ilısu Dam Campaign
- Southeastern Anatolia Project

== Sources ==
- Ahmed, Kamal (1 July 2001). "UK drops Turkish dam plan". The Observer.
- Amitai-Preiss, Reuven (1 September 2005), Mongols and Mamluks: The Mamluk-Ilkhanid War, 1260–1281, Cambridge University Press, ISBN 0-521-46226-6
- Astour, Michael C. (1992), "The North Mesopotamian Kingdom of Ilānșurā", in Young, Gordon Douglas (ed.), Mari in Retrospect, Winona Lake, Indiana: American Oriental Society/Eisenbrauns, pp. 1–33, ISBN 0-931464-28-5
- Ayliffe, Rosie; Dubin, Marc; Gawthrop, John; Richardson, Terry (2003), The Rough Guide to Turkey, Rough Guides, ISBN 1-84353-071-6
- Babinger, Franz (1978). William C. Hickman (ed.). Mehmed the Conqueror and his Time. Bollingen Series XCVI. Translated by Ralph Manheim. Princeton University Press. ISBN 0-691-09900-6.
- "European banks withdraw from Ilisu dam project in Turkey:NGOs welcome pullout as the right decision". Bank Track. 10 July 2009.
- Floor, Willem M. (2008). Titles and Emoluments in Safavid Iran: A Third Manual of Safavid Administration, by Mirza Naqi Nasiri. Washington, DC: Mage Publishers. ISBN 978-1-933823-23-2.
- "Insurers halt work on Turkish dam". BBC. 24 December 2008.
- Bolz, Diane M. (March 2009), "Endangered Site: The City of Hasankeyf, Turkey", Smithsonian
- "Hasankeyf Raman Dağı'na taşınıyor" [Hasankeyf is moving to Mount Raman]. Buğday Association for Supporting Ecological Living. 3 October 2005.
- Chahan de Cirbied, Jacques (1813), "Notice de deux Manuscrits Arméniens, de la Bibliothèque impériale, n.^{os} 95 et 99, contentant l'histoire écrit par Mathieu Eretz, et Extrait relatif à l'histoire de la première croisade" [Notice of two Armenian manuscripts from the Bibliothèque Impériale, numbers 95 and 99, containing the history recorded by Matthew Eretz, and an extract relating to the history of the First Crusade], Notices et extraits des manuscrits de la Bibliothèque Nationale et autres bibliothèques [Notices and extracts of manuscripts in the Bibliothèque Nationale and other libraries] (in French), vol. 9, pp. 275–364
- Comfort, Anthony Martin (14 May 2009). Roads on the frontier between Rome and Persia: Euphratesia, Osrhoene and Mesopotamia from AD 363 to 602 (Ph.D.). University of Exeter. hdl:10036/68213.
- Darke, Diana (1 May 2014), Eastern Turkey, Bradt, ISBN 978-1-84162-490-7
- Davidson, Christina (November 2008). "Turkish bath". The Atlantic Monthly. pp. 30–31.
- "Çevre Bakanı Veysel Eroğlu öyle bir söz etti ki Ilısu Baraj projesi Türkiye'nin başını 'ağrıtmaya' devam ediyor" [Environment Minister Veysel Eroglu says the Ilisu Dam project is a 'head ache' for Turkey.]. Ekonomik Ayrıntı. Archived from the original on 2014-12-17.
- A. Fink: Der arabische Dialekt von Hasankeyf am Tigris (Osttürkei). Geschichte – Grammatik – Texte – Glossar. Harrassowitz, Wiesbaden 2017 (Semitica Viva 57), ISBN 978-3-447-10898-0
- Huggler, Justin (21 July 2000). "The Rising Tide of Destruction". The Independent.
- "Barbaric". Globefox.
- Humphreys, R. Stephen (1977), From Saladin to the Mongols: The Ayyubids of Damascus, 1193–1260, Albany, New York: State University of New York Press, ISBN 0-87395-263-4
- "South-Eastern Anatolia: Hasankeyf". Guide Martine. Archived from the original on May 4, 2003.
- Lendering, Jona (2010). "Cepha (Hasankeyf)". Livius.org.
- Marciak, Michał (2014), "The Cultural Landscape of Sophene from Hellenistic to Early Byzantine Times" (PDF), Göttinger Forum für Altertumswissenschaft, 17 (17): 13–56, doi:10.14628/gfa.2014.0.74280
- Meinecke, Michael (1996), "3. Hasankeyf/Ḥiṣn Kaifā on the Tigris: A Regional Center on the Crossroad of Foreign Influences", Patterns of Stylistic Changes in Islamic Architecture: Local Traditions Versus Migrating Artists, New York University Press, ISBN 978-0-8147-5492-4
- Raleigh, Walter (1614), "Chapter 3, Section 10", The History of the World, vol. Part 1, Book 1, London: Walter Burre, p. 44, line 23
- "Hasankeyf". Republic of Turkey Ministry of Culture and Tourism. 2005.
- "Batman" (in Turkish). Republic of Turkey, Ministry of Development. Archived from the original on 17 December 2014.
- Sinclair, T.A. (1989), Eastern Turkey: An Architectural and Archaeological Survey, vol. 3, Pindar Press, ISBN 0-907132-34-0
- Singh, Nagendra Kumar (2000), International Encyclopaedia of Islamic Dynasties, Anmol Publications PVT. LTD., ISBN 81-261-0403-1
- Smith-Spark, Laura (5 August 2006). "Turkey Dam Project Back to Haunt Kurds". BBC News.
- Starr, Stephen (28 September 2010), "Turkish history to sink to oblivion", Asia Times, archived from the original on 12 September 2010
- Taylor, J.G. (1865), "Travels in Kurdistan, with Notices of the Sources of the Eastern and Western Tigris, and Ancient Ruins in their Neighbourhood", Journal of the Royal Geographical Society, 35, London: 21–58, doi:10.2307/3698077, JSTOR 3698077
- "Roman mosaics discovered in Hasankeyf". Today's Zaman. 28 August 2007. Archived from the original on 5 March 2016.
