= List of texts corresponding with the Bible =

Texts corresponding with the bible are often used to corroborate history surrounding the events mentioned

Title	Date	Biblical Parallels
Memphite Creation	2700 BC	Gen 1-2
Famine Stela	2700 BC	Gen 12:10; 41:1-57
Instructions of Ptah Hotep	~2500 BC	Prov 2; 6:1-35; 23:1-35; 25:1-26:28; Eccl 1-12
Sargon Legend	2000s BC	Exod 2
Epic of Gilgamesh	1900 BC	Gen 6-9
Code of Hammurabi	~1750 BC	Exod 20-24; Lev 16-26; Duet 12-26
Mari Tablets	1700s BC	Gen 1:1-Num 36:13
Atrahasis Epic	1700s BC	Gen 1-11
Amarna Letters and Tell el-Amarna Tablets	1550~1150 BC	Josh 1-24
Ras Shamra Tablets	1400s BC	
Merneptah Stela	1209 BC	Josh 1-24
Ludlul Bel Nemeqi	1000 BC	Job 1:1-42:17}

== See also ==
- Ludlul bēl nēmeqi

== Bibliography ==
- Bill T. Arnold and Bryan E. Beyer: Readings from the Ancient Near East (2002)
- William W. Hallo & K. Lawson Younger: The Context of Scripture (2003)
- Miriam Lichtheim: Ancient Egyptian Literature (1971-1980)
- Victor H. Matthews & Don C. Benjamin: Old Testament Parallels: Laws and Stories from the Ancient Near East (2006)
- James B. Pritchard: Ancient Near East Texts Relating to the Old Testament (1969)
- Kenton L. Sparks: Ancient Texts for the Study of the Hebrew Bible (2005)
