= Diyarbekir Province =

Diyarbekir Province may refer to:

- Diyarbekir Vilayet
- Diyarbekir Eyalet
