= Mari texts =

Cuneiform clay tablets

The Mari texts consist of several thousand cuneiform clay tablets] and fragments unearthed at the ancient Syrian site of Tell Hariri, ancient Mari, mostly dating from the beginning of the 18th century BC, before the destruction of the city. The tablets were primarily unearthed by a French archaeological team in rooms of the Royal Palace of Mari during the 1930s. Their translation and analysis have since been conducted mainly by French teams based in Paris. To date, at least 9,000 tablets have been published, out of a total of maybe 19,000 tablets and fragments. They are currently housed in Syria.

This corpus is, in terms of both quantity and significance, one of the most important for the study of the history of the ancient Near East. These texts have provided a wealth of information about the Kingdom of Mari and the rest of the Near East during the years 1810–1760 BCE. They consist of royal archives, comprising mainly administrative documents and letters. They primarily document the administration and political life of the kingdom, but also the lives of those associated with the palace, foremost among them the king, his wives, and the administrative and domestic staff. More generally, they document numerous aspects of society during these periods, particularly through the letters.

== Archives ==
=== Discoveries ===
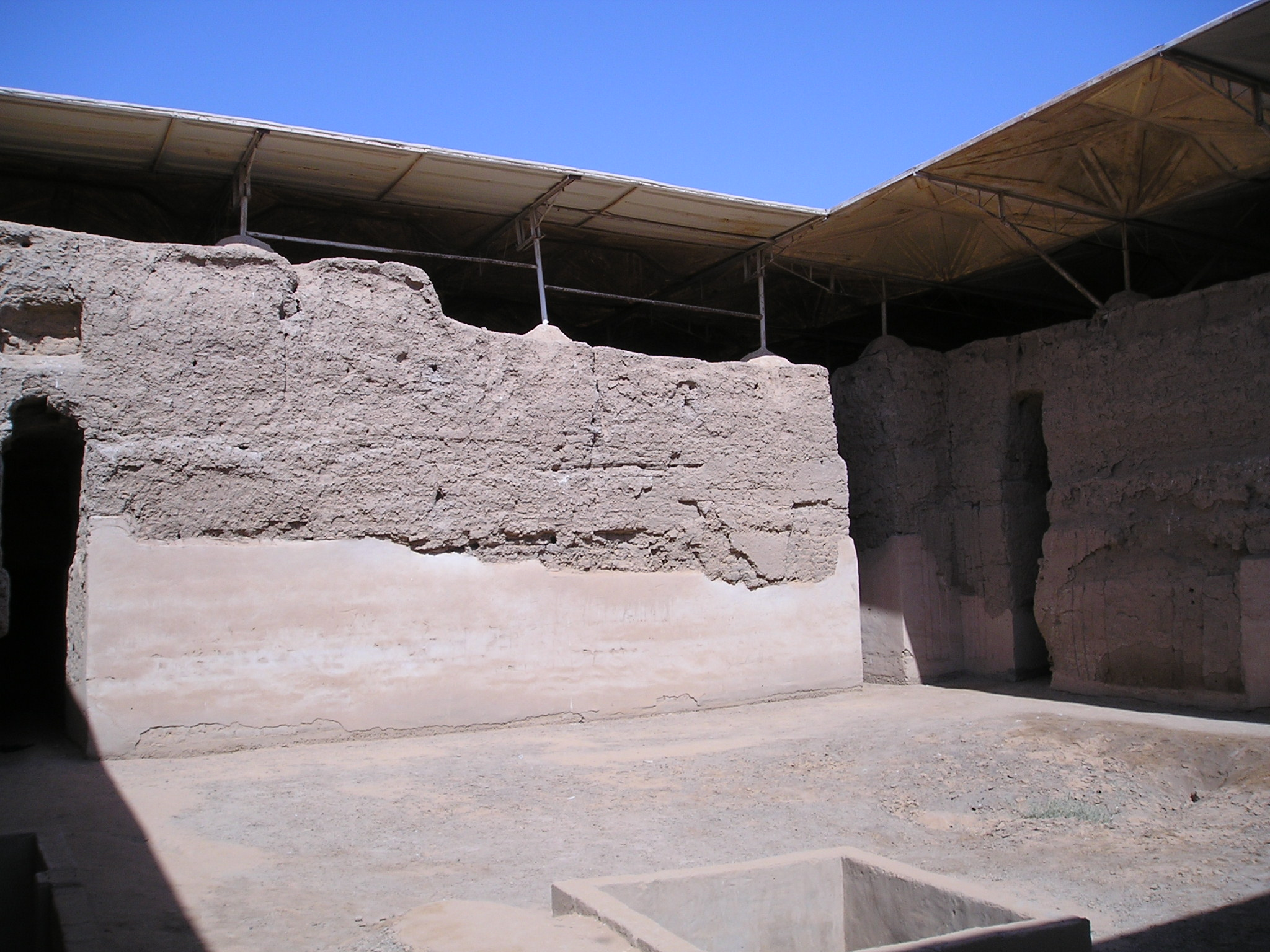
Inner courtyard of the Royal Palace of Mari

Excavations at the Mari site (modern Tell Hariri) began in 1933 under the direction of French archaeologist André Parrot. Most of the tablets were discovered in the city's royal palace between 1934 and 1937; in particular, approximately 13,000 tablets in the winter of 1935–1936 and 6,000 to 8,000 in the winter of 1936–1937.

The archives unearthed at various locations within the royal palace comprise a collection of more than 20,000 tablets and fragments, according to A. Parrot following his discoveries. Since many of the fragments are very small, D. Charpin has revised this figure down to approximately 13,000 usable texts, of which more than 9,000 were published in 2019.

Other collections of texts from the same period have been found at Mari outside the royal palace: approximately 300 administrative texts from the "Small Eastern Palace"; other administrative documents were found in "Building E"; and approximately 1,500 educational and literary texts from the "House of Tablets." Most of them are still unpublished.

=== Date ===
The oldest texts, numbering approximately 1,500, are the so-called "Šakkanakku texts," which differ from the rest in their writing style and date from the second half of the 19th century BC, that is, from the very end of the Šakkanakku rulers period and the early part of the reign of Yahdun-Lim. These are administrative documents, most of which were discovered during recent excavation campaigns and have yet to be thoroughly studied. The vast majority of the tablets—and the portion that has been the focus of most of the translators’ efforts—covers the half-century from 1810 to 1760 BC, with the vast majority dating from the reign of Zimri-Lim (1775-1761 BC).

=== Script and language ===
The Mari tablets are written in cuneiform, in the Akkadian language, in its so-called "Old Babylonian" variant. This convention is linked to chancellery practices: before the beginning of the reign of Yahdun-Lim, until around 1805, texts were written in the šakkanakku script—a style attested in several hundred tablets from Mari, as well as from Terqa and Tuttul, dating from the final decades of the 19th century BC, and thus reflecting earlier local customs (which may date back several centuries). After this date, a "reform" required the scribes of Mari to use the Old Babylonian script practiced in Lower Mesopotamia, which was also the standard script of the time—the most widespread and commonly used for communication in the Near East during the Amorite dynasties period. More specifically, Mari aligned itself with the practices of the scribes of the kingdom of Eshnunna. The era of Samsi-Addu, with its Akkadian culture, reinforced this situation. Texts written inlanguages other than Akkadian are rare: there are educational and literary texts in Sumerian language, used in literate circles under Mesopotamian influence, but few people in Mari were fluent in it; a few incantations texts are in Hurrian.

=== Text types ===
The royal archives of Mari consist of tablets left behind by the Babylonian conquerors when they captured the city and plundered the palace in 1761-1760 BC, although they did take away some of the tablets they considered more important. They fall mainly into two broad categories: accounting documents and letters.

First, the most numerous are the administrative, accounting texts documenting the king's administration, particularly tablets recording the receipt and distribution of goods, notably texts detailing the distribution of food for the royal table (the "king’s meals"), rations distributed to palace staff, gifts offered to messengers and foreign courts, as well as inventory records of goods stored in the palace (particularly precious objects and raw materials intended for palace artisans), lists of fields belonging to the royal estate and tax documents, lists of palace workers and deported prisoners of war, etc. Other administrative texts document the administration of the provinces, notably censuses conducted for military purposes and gifts offered to the king by local notables. These are often short or at least terse texts; taken individually, they provide limited information, but when grouped into coherent series, they offer significant insights into the functioning of the administration and the material life of the period. The fact that these texts are often dated allows them to be used to reconstruct political history.

The letters from the royal archives of Mari constitute the most studied and highlighted part of this corpus due to their "vivid" nature and the wealth of information they provide, even though understanding them can be challenging due to the lack of context (particularly the loss of preceding and subsequent letters when dealing with multiple exchanges). It includes the kings’ correspondence with their subordinates stationed in the provinces or on missions abroad, as well as the portion of their diplomatic correspondence that the Babylonians did not take with them (they evidently took the letters sent by the most powerful kings, beginning with those of their own king Hammurabi). A significant collection of letters consists of women's correspondence—letters sent by women of the palace to the king or to other individuals.

The palace of Mari has also yielded, in much smaller quantities, commemorative and historiographical texts, as well as legal, ritual, educational, and literary documents.

=== Translation and studies ===
The rediscovery of the tablets from the Royal Palace of Mari and their subsequent translation revealed an unsuspected world in a region previously considered to be on the periphery of Mesopotamian civilization and its refined culture, and provided a wealth of information on political, religious, administrative, and other subjects, as well as insights into the biblical cultural context, which certainly piqued the interest of an academic and educated audience.

All of the discovered tablets were then shipped to Paris but remained the property of Syria, even though the standard practice is to share such discoveries. After being copied and photographed, they were all returned in 2005 and were for the most part stored at the museum in Deir ez-Zor, before the Syrian civil war.

They have not been published in their entirety. The publication is being carried out by teams in Paris, initially led by G. Dossin. In 1950, the first volume of the "Archives Royales de Mari" ("ARM") series was published, with the aim of publishing the tablets recovered from the excavations of the royal palace. G. Dossin directed the work until 1978, when J.-M. Durand replaced him. Initially, the letters were published according to their senders, while administrative texts were published by place of discovery, and later by theme at the initiative of M. Birot. The principle of thematic collections subsequently became established, incorporating historical studies (which had previously been published separately in articles) through the ARM series and also the series titled "Florilegium Marianum" ("FM").

The texts from Mari are presently available online in transcription and translation on the ARCHIBAB website. Few general overviews have been devoted to the content of these texts, as well as anthologies of letters with commentary (in French by J.-M. Durand, in English by W. Heimpel and J. Sasson).

The tablets unearthed during excavations after 1998 have been entrusted to a team led by A. Cavigneaux.

== Topics ==
Syria and Upper Mesopotamia during the Mari Archives period. Cities whose locations are uncertain are in italics.

The fields of research covered by the Mari archives are rich and varied. Studies focus primarily on understanding the chronological and geographical contexts of the period covered by the texts, but also on analyzing accounting practices and material culture. The fact that the tablets belong to a royal court makes them particularly valuable, given that most archives from this period are private: "Royal archives are a gold mine for historians, because they contain records of seminal events, political struggles, public administration, and foreign affairs, while private archives rarely shed light on matters outside the limited world of their owners." But their richness goes even further: "Whether it concerns religious, political, cultural, or economic life, not a single area escapes Mari’s documentation. One even finds particularly rare files, such as the correspondence of musicians, or letters containing prophecies or dreams. From these archives, we learn how trees were grafted, how white horses were kept in the palace courtyard..." The correspondence, in particular, has attracted interest: "The hundreds of letters, however, are what give the Mari archives their special flavor. Especially gratifying are the documents kings received from administrators and from diplomats stationed in dozens of capitals. Moreover, in these letters, women transcend the stereotype we hold of them as docile daughters, wives, or mothers: they prove to be thoughtful, articulate, and forceful."

=== Languages and ethnicity ===
The written languages of the Mari texts do not necessarily correspond to the spoken, vernacular ones of the time. Certain types of texts may, however, come closer to the spoken language, particularly letters reporting speeches, while personal names may also reflect the way people expressed themselves in everyday life. However, personal names do not necessarily serve to determine which language a person speaks in daily life, as has often been assumed: there are families in which brothers bear one name in Akkadian and another in Amorite or Hurrian.

In any case, there is little doubt that the Kingdom of Mari and its neighbors were characterized by linguistic diversity: part of the population spoke a form of Akkadian, which was also the lingua franca of the time (there do not appear to have been any interpreters during meetings between kings); another group spoke a language called "Amorite," which is a West Semitic language; still others spoke Hurrian, a linguistic isolate widespread in the lands north of Mari, referred to in the texts of the time by the term "Subarian" "

Moving from linguistic practices to ethnic categorizations is more difficult. Thus, a person referred to as "Subarian" in the texts is in fact from the region called Shubartum, since people of that era defined themselves primarily by their place of origin, but does not necessarily speak the language called "Subarian," although the two terms share the same origin. The case of the "Amorites" is even more complicated, as this term refers in modern scholarly literature to people who are in very different situations and do not necessarily speak the Amorite language: nomadic groups, sedentary populations, and descendants of Amorites who had settled in Lower Mesopotamia several centuries earlier and spoke the local language, Babylonian. Moreover, while there were certainly significant population movements during the last centuries of the 3rd millennium BC, notably the arrival of Amorite and Hurrian groups, which altered the demographic profile of the Mari region and Upper Mesopotamia. However, by the time of the archives, the situation had evolved considerably, and it is very difficult to distinguish between various ethnic components within the kingdom.

=== Political and military history ===
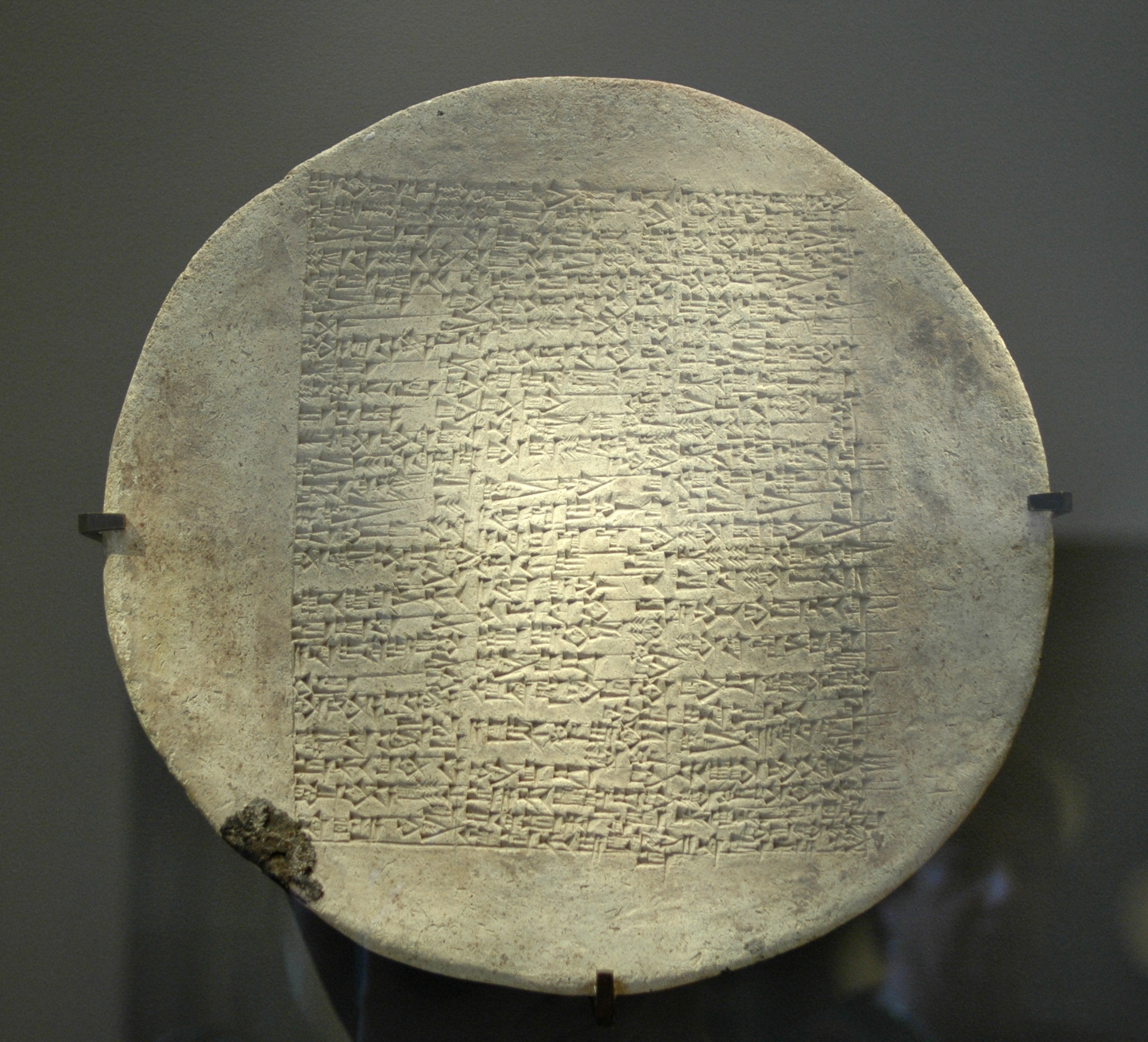
Inscribed disk commemorating Yahdun-Lim's victory over the Benjaminites and his expedition to the Mediterranean, Louvre Museum.

Yahdun-Lim is the first well-known king of Mari from the archives period. He reigned from 1810 to 1794 BC. Little is known about his father, Yaggid-Lim, but he was a Bensimalite tribal chief who appears to have ruled in Suprum, a city located near Mari but on the opposite bank of the Euphrates. Once in power, Yahdun-Lim's first undertaking was to expand his kingdom westward, where he subjugated Terqa and Tuttul. He then turned his attention to the Khabur triangle to the north, where, at the same time, King Samsi-Addu of Ekallatum was attempting to establish a foothold, and whom he defeated. He then fell out with the king of Aleppo (Yamhad), preferring an alliance with Eshnunna over the latter's, and in retaliation, the king of Aleppo supported a revolt by the Benjaminite nomads against him. His reign ended with a coup d’état that brought his son Sumu-Yamam to power.

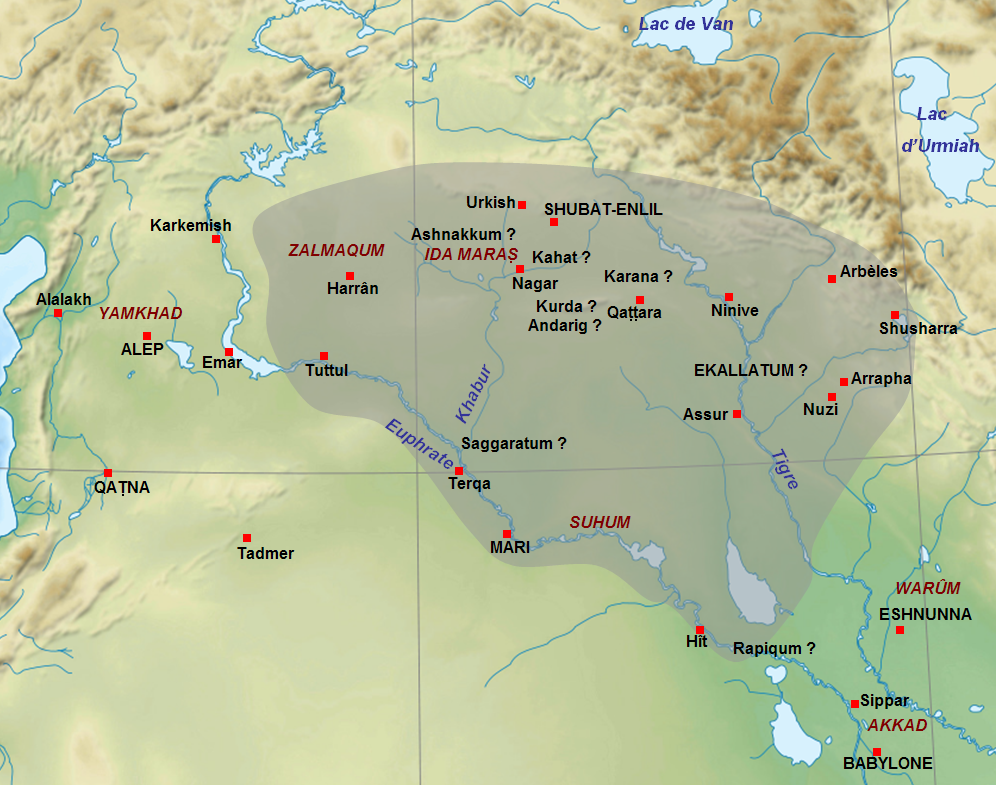
Approximate extent of the Kingdom of Upper Mesopotamia at the time of Samsi-Addu's death.

This turbulent period ended in 1792 BC with the invasion of the Kingdom of Mari by Samsi-Addu (in Akkadian, Shamshi-Adad). He ultimately chose to let Mari serve as the capital of a kingdom, placing his son Yasmah-Addu on the throne there around 1782 BC, while retaining preeminence by controlling, in particular, its foreign policy and, more generally, major affairs from his capital, Shubat-Enlil (modern historians often refer to this political entity as the "Kingdom of Upper Mesopotamia"). Samsi-Addu maintained tense relations with King Sumu-epuh of Aleppo due to his alliance with the latter's enemy, the king of Qatna, whose daughter had married Yasmah-Addu. The king of Aleppo then lent his support to Zimri-Lim, the leader of the tribe to which Yahdun-Lim belonged, as well as to other kings who had been driven out by Samsi-Addu. The end of Samsi-Addu's reign was marked by revolts, and his death in 1775 BC led to the collapse of his political structure. Yasmah-Addu held on to Mari for only a few more months, after which Zimri-Lim seized the city.

Once he ascended the throne, Zimri-Lim had to choose between becoming a vassal of Eshnunna, as Yahdun-Lim had been before him, or of Aleppo, which had protected him during his years of exile. He chose the latter, and thus found himself in conflict with Eshnunna, which in turn sparked a revolt by the Benjaminites. Zimri-Lim succeeded in overcoming this ordeal and thereby strengthened his power, establishing himself as one the most powerful kings of the Near East. The remainder of his reign was devoted to consolidating Mari's leading role on the international stage. He chose to ally himself with the king of Elam when the latter attacked Eshnunna. Once that city had fallen, however, the Elamite king chose to continue southward and northward into Mesopotamia, threatening Mari's positions in the Khabur region. Zimri-Lim then allied himself with King Hammurabi of Babylon, who had also supported the Elamite king before coming to regret it. The two managed to forge a coalition against Elam, which succeeded in driving the attacker back. Bolstered by this success, Zimri-Lim strengthened his hold on Upper Mesopotamia, but the region's unstable situation forced him to intervene directly. The alliance with Hammurabi continued, with troops from Mari providing the Babylonian king with support to seize the powerful kingdom of Larsa.

The alliance with the king of Babylon backfired on Zimri-Lim: once he had secured control of southern Mesopotamia, Hammurabi began to set his sights on the north, where he encroached on Mari's territories. The sequence of events is unclear, but it culminated in a conflict between the two former allies, and Mari was captured by the Babylonian armies in 1761 BC. It was occupied for several months and finally methodically destroyed in 1759.

Archaeological evidence clearly documents these stages at the palace: the building was stripped of most of its contents, its archives were sorted through, and items of interest to the Babylonian authorities were taken away; then, at the end of the occupation, it was set on fire and demolished (the upper floor collapsed onto the ground floor). The city wall was razed. The fate of the rest of the city is poorly understood: the temples may also have been destroyed, and the condition of the residential quarters is unknown due to a lack of excavations. It is likely that the city's population, or at least part of it, was then deported.

=== Social groups ===
According to the patrimonial approach (or "patrimonialism") the fundamental concept underlying societyin the Ancient Near East is that of the "House" (Sumerian é-; Akkadian bītum): it is a unit organized around a head of the family (usually an adult man), comprising at least his close (nuclear) family, and potentially members of his extended family, his free or enslaved servants, also the property at his disposal (residence, fields, animals, workshops, money, etc., forming an "estate" among the wealthiest), as well as his ancestors (ancestral worship, family crypts sometimes located beneath residences). The kingdom of Mari is further composed of "houses" of vastly differing importance, depending on whether they belong to commoners (humble households), notables, deities (temples, whose role is nevertheless more limited in Mari than in Babylonia), or the king, whose house—the "Palace" (ekallum, derived from a Sumerian word meaning "Big House")—is the most important and powerful.

In any case, these groupings are based on kinship. In accordance with the norms of the period, the family was patriarchal; polygamy was possible but practiced primarily among the elite. The texts provide information on marriages, particularly within the royal family, but these offer parallels with what is known about contemporary Babylonia, likely reflecting common practices. Marriage is arranged between families and viewed as a way to bind them together, to unite the two "Houses," and to strengthen their ties. The bride joins her fiancé's family with a dowry, while her family receives a wedding gift (the so-called "bride price"). The wedding ceremony is described using the metaphor "tying the fringe" (of a garment; or a cord?), which may refer to a gesture in the marriage rite. Conversely, divorce is the moment when the fringe is cut. The gesture sealing the union is the groom placing a veil on the bride's head. Information regarding children comes foremost from the royal family: the texts mention births, as well as the deaths of newborns and the presence of wet nurses. Issues of inheritance are very poorly documented, and therefore not well understood. The palace archives indicate primarily that upon the death of an official, an inventory of his possessions was taken in order to distinguish between his personal property—which his heirs could divide among themselves—and the property he had received from the palace upon taking office, which had to be returned.

Other groupings broader than the family encompass at least part of the kingdom's population—whether nomadic or sedentary—namely those related to the tribal system (see below). In this context, an individual may belong to a tribe (especially the Bensimalites or the Benjaminites), one of its subdivisions, and a clan, and be subject to the authority of their traditional chiefs. Membership is generally determined by birth, but an individual may also join the group (usually along with the group to which they previously belonged) during a ceremony marked by the rite of killing a donkey foal.

The hierarchical division of society into three distinct groups found in the Code of Hammurabi is also present in the contemporary Mari society. The elite consists of the group whose members are designated as awīlum ("free man"), who are distinguished from the rest of the population by their moral qualities. In practice, this is the group that works for the Palace (or its upper echelons), following the ilkum system—service performed on behalf of the king that entitles one to rations or land grants. Consequently, they are the best documented by textual sources, which originate from the palatial administration. The most important figures in the kingdom, the notables who form the king's inner circle, are referred to by the term wēdum, meaning "unique." The second group is designated by the term muškenum, meaning literally "one who bows" (implied: "before an awīlum"), a "private citizen." It seems that this group consists of people who do not work within the palace and live independently in urban or rural communities (though they are still subject to corvée labor). Little is known about them because they only occasionally interacted with the palace administration.

The third group consisted of the non-free population, slaves, referred to by the terms wardum (masculine) and amtum (feminine), which broadly denotes someone "inferior" or the "servant" of another. People of that era did not have the concept of absolute freedom or servitude, which stems from Hellenism; these notions are relative to a social situation, and complete freedom or servitude would not have been understood. A person could become a slave by birth, or by force, whether captured during a war, abducted during a raid, or sold by a family burdened by debt. They are bought, sold, and given as gifts. They are identified by distinctive marks, notably the fact that they wear chains or a collar, though this does not prevent slave escapes from being a common occurrence. Slaves were generally assigned to domestic tasks, such as weaving or grinding grain; the palace had large workshop-prisons where people in a state of servitude were gathered.

Other categories of people, comprising a small number of individuals, appear in the texts without their significance being fully understood; for example, a nasīhū, some kind of political refugee.

There remains the case of thehapirum, documented in several Mari texts. This term refers to a type of person attested in other kingdoms of Syria and the Levant in the 2nd millennium BC (ʿApiru). In the Mari context, these are political exiles, people who have dissociated themselves from a social group, particularly in the context of political struggles, and thus find themselves in a precarious situation because they lose their social base and often arouse suspicion among the people of the countries where they seek refuge.

The majority of the population lives in rural areas. Settlements there are organized around market towns and villages. Their number is unknown: field surveys have identified 27 sites for this period, but textual sources list at least 86 place names that may have been villages. The texts also indicate the presence of isolated farms (dimtum) and scattered settlements. The texts seem to indicate that the in the center of the kingdom, around Mari, Terqa, and Saggaratum, were densely populated, with the district of the capital likely being the most populous. Certain areas were developed during this period, such as the region of present-day Deir ez-Zor, which underwent irrigation and development projects under Yahdun-Lim, who built a city there named after himself (Dur-Yahdun-Lim, "Fort Yahdun-Lim"). Non-irrigated areas were less densely populated. The Qattunan district appears to have been primarily a pastoral area, but irrigation projects were carried out there at the beginning of the reign of Zimri-Lim.

The population living in the city of Mari itself is difficult to estimate, but the city was probably not densely populated. Settlements and buildings were likely concentrated mainly in the central part, around the monumental center, which also included the residences of the elite. The texts mention a division into neighborhoods (bābtum) and refer to their inhabitants as "sons of the city " (dumu-meš ālim), whose exact status is not well understood, as well as the merchants living in the commercial district (karūm) and the craftsmen who occupied buildings that served as both their homes and workshops.

=== Nomadism and tribal system ===
The Mari tablets are a documentation of paramount importance for the study of nomadic groups in the ancient Near East. In these texts, they are referred to by the term hana/hanû, which can be translated as "those who live in tents" or "Bedouins." They are characterized by an itinerant, non-sedentary lifestyle and a pastoral economy (transhumant herding). A concept associated with their way of life is that of the "steppe," nawum, which more precisely refers to the grazing areas traversed by these groups.

These groups are organized along tribal lines: individuals belong by birth to an extended human group that traces its lineage to a common mythical ancestor. These tribes are themselves divided into sub-tribes, and all these groups have their own political structures with traditional leaders ("sheikhs," to use the Arabic terminology). These are not static groups, since they can incorporate outsiders, and there are tribal integration pacts through which two groups become one. Actually, this system does not correspond to the dichotomy between nomads and sedentary peoples, since sedentary people can belong to a tribe and there are towns and villages that are identified by their affiliation with a tribal group. This was indeed the case for the kings of Mari and the majority of their inner circle, which explains why tribal dynamics played an important role in the kingdom's political life. Therefore, they are often defined as "semi-nomadic" groups, where one part of the tribe practices pastoral nomadism while the other follows an agricultural way of life, bearing in mind that shifts from one to the other can easily occur.

The tribes of the Kingdom of Mari are divided into two major groups: the "Sons of the Left," Bensimalites, and the "Sons of the Right," Benjaminites; with the left/right distinction actually corresponding to a south–north distinction, perhaps due to their regions of origin. The Bensimalites are divided into two groups, the Yabasu and the Asharugayu, which are themselves subdivided into clans (gayum) and placed under the authority of the "pasture chiefs" (merhum). The chiefs of the Bensimalites are members of the dynasty of Yahdun-Lim and Zimri-Lim; which explains why the latter bears the title "King of Mari and the Bedouins" and exercises authority over the nomadic Bensim’alite groups even when they are outside the kingdom of Mari. The Benjaminites, for their part, are divided into five groups, each led by a chief: the Uprapu, the Yahruru, the Amnanu, the Rahbu, and the Yarihu. The Benjaminite tribes are attested in Syria and also in Mesopotamia, where they are more generally referred to as "Westerners," Amorites, whereas the Bensimalites are known only in the context of Mari. The Benjaminites of Mari were thus subjects of Zimri-Lim, with a status similar to that of "vassal" kingdoms. Relations between this king and the Benjaminites were turbulent, and tribal rivalries likely played a significant role in this situation. They rebelled during his fifth year of reign, and those who remained in the kingdom after their defeat were subject to the authority of the king of Mari (their lands were considered leased from him) and to military conscription, although they often sought to evade it.

Emphasis is therefore sometimes placed on the complementarity between nomadic and sedentary ways of life, illustrated, for example, by the exchange of pastoral products (wool, and even dairy products) for agricultural products (foremost grains). On the other hand, conflicts between the two groups are also documented, including raids carried out by nomadic groups against villages and caravans. This creates a situation of chronic insecurity when nomadic groups poorly controlled by the authorities are present in a region. Violence occurs all the more easily when the targets belong to a rival tribe, or doesn't belong to any of the tribes of the region.

Tribal culture is marked not only by nomadic-sedentary relations but also by specific political practices, particularly regarding alliances and the integration of new members into the group, meetings of traditional leaders, and the common use of discussion, as well as the emphasis on the principles of honor and vengeance (a "blood price"). While the urban/sedentary life is dominant in scribal culture and therefore in cuneiform documentation, some letters of Mari show that there was among these tribes a strong sens of pride linked to the nomadic way of life.

Nomadism and tribalism in the Kingdom of Mari are not limited to the Bensimalites and the Benjaminites, as other groups of nomadic or semi-nomadic tribes are known, notably the Suteans in the south of the kingdom, who speak their own language.

=== Diplomacy ===
The letters found at Mari are the main source of information on international relations in the 18th century BC, just as the Amarna Letters do for the 14th century BC. They point to the existence of a diplomatic system based on a set of norms that regulated relations between kingdoms. They also possess an undeniable narrative quality: "the letters diplomats send can be fairly long and incredibly garrulous, reporting dialogues, dispensing anecdotes, even spreading juicy gossip about the courts they are visiting."

A hierarchical principle governs international relations: a group of great kings of roughly equal power (Mari, Yamhad, Qatna, Babylon, Larsa, Eshnunna, Elam), rule over second-tier kings, who are generally vassals of one of the former. This is expressed in the terminology as a relationship between "lord/master" and "servant," but also through the metaphor of the family: in their letters, the most powerful kings regard themselves as the "fathers" of the less powerful, who are their "sons." Rulers of equal rank regarded one another as "brothers." These positions shifted depending on changes in the balance of power; for example, Zimri-Lim had to prove himself early in his reign and win several conflicts to establish himself as a first-rank king.

No king is truly powerful just on his own: ten to fifteen kings follow Hammurabi of Babylon, as many follow Rim-Sin of Larsa, as many follow Ibal-pi-El of Ešnunna, and as many follow Amut-pi-El of Qatna; but twenty kings follow Yarim-Lim of Yamḫad.

In times of peace, the royal courts exchanged messages and gifts. These relations were facilitated by messengers, who served as a sort of non-permanent ambassador. In principle, the exchange of gifts was based on reciprocity: a king had to offer gifts of equal value to those he received, and any deviation from this principle could be viewed as an affront.

This matter ought not be discussed; yet I must say it now and vent my feelings. You are a great king. When you placed a request with me for 2 horses, I indeed had them conveyed to you. Yet you, you sent me (just) 20 pounds of tin. Without doubt, when you sent this paltry amount of tin, you had no desire to have honorable discourse with me. Had you planned sending nothing at all—by the god of my father!—I might be displeased! Among us in Qatna, the value of such horses is 600 šekels [10 pounds] of silver. But you sent me just 20 pounds of tin! What would anyone hearing this say? Would he not mock us? This house is your house. What is lacking in your house that a brother cannot fulfill the need of his equal? Had you not planned to send me any tin, I might not be upset over it. Are you not a great king? Why have you done this? This house is your house!.

Marital alliances strengthened ties between courts, whether they were allies or in a vassal relationship, and also when they concluded peace following a war. Two marriages of kings of Mari are well documented: that of Yasmah-Addu to a princess of Qatna (named Beltum in the tablets of that reign, likely identical to Dam-hurasi, who is known to have been a wife of Zimri-Lim who took over the previous king's harem); that of Zimri-Lim to a princess from Yamhad named Shibtu. A dowry for the bride was prepared by her family, and various gifts were offered by the groom to his new in-laws. Zimri-Lim also pursued a very active matrimonial policy, marrying off several of his sisters and daughters to his vassals in order to strengthen his authority.

The procedures leading to a diplomatic alliance are also well understood, thanks to documentation from Mari, supplemented by evidence from sites dating to the same period (notably Tell Leilan). These are "oaths by the gods" in which one king makes a commitment to another, whether it be a vassal swearing loyalty to his suzerain, an ally vowing to come to the aid of his "brother" against a third king, or two former enemies promising never to attack one another again. Some of the texts recited during these oaths were put in writing, and have been preserved in the Mari archives; these are not "treaties" in the strict sense of the term. Rituals were also performed during these oaths: when kings gathered in the same place to take an oath, they sacrificed a donkey-foal before sharing a meal; if they concluded their alliance while apart from one another, the ritual was called "touching the throat" (smearing with blood?).

=== Palatial life ===
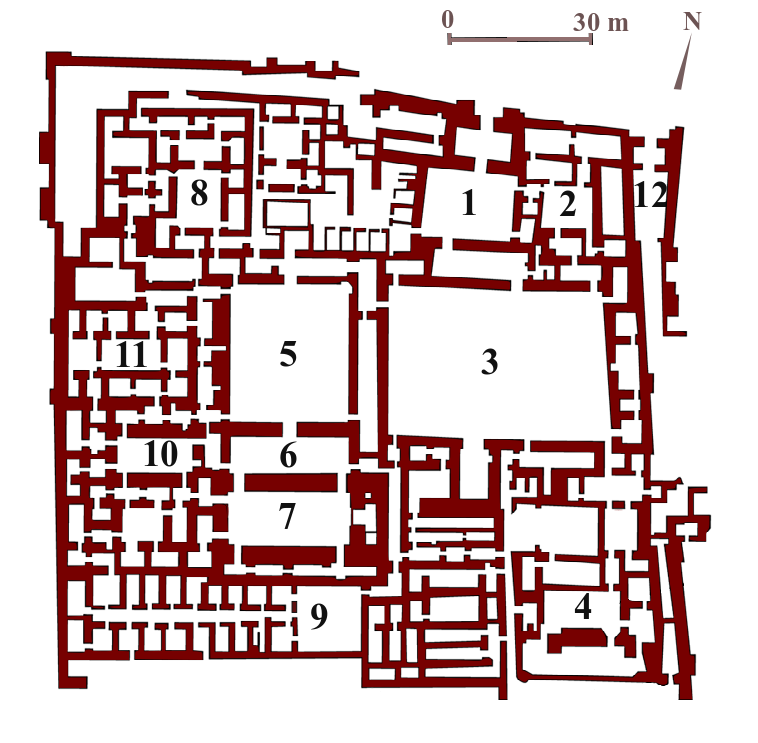
Plan of the Royal palace of Mari during the reign of Zimri-Lim. 1. entrance courtyard 2. steward's quarters (bīt tertim) 3. courtyard of the painted building 4. temple of the "Lady of the Palace" 5. palm tree courtyard 6. vestibule (papahum) 7. Throne Room 8. "Harem," Women's Quarters 9. Servants’ Quarters 10. Kitchens 11. Administrative Section of the Harem 12. Gate of Nergal.

The Royal Palace of Mari is the main monument explored during excavations at the site; it yielded the most artifacts, as well as the bulk of the written documentation. While archaeological studies have provided a lot of information on the organization and functioning of an ancient palace, the texts offer additional insights. In these sources, "the palace is revealed in all its different aspects: its gardens and courtyards where one day a princess dangerously exposed herself to the sun, its sanctuaries, its various administrative functions, its storehouses, and its workshops. The harem, which occupied the northwestern part of the palace, was inhabited by a large number of women—ranging from the queen mother and the principal royal wife to slaves and captives, including concubines—who served as musicians, scribes, cooks, water carriers, and floor sweepers. At the palace entrance, prophets would come to proclaim the truths that a deity had revealed to them."

Storehouse management was crucial to the palatial economy. Thousands of accounting tablets dating from the reign of Zimri-Lim document the distribution of rations to palace servants, the distribution of raw materials to artisans, and inventory lists of goods stored in the palace, particularly luxury goods. Various studies have been conducted based on these administrative documents, combined with letters and organized by type of property, which incidentally provide important information on different aspects of material life at the time that have been the subject of specific studies: grain, oil, wine, bronze, luxury tableware, notably the vases designated by the ideogram GAL, which were found in the major courts of the time, perfumes, etc. Accounting documents provide an unexpected wealth of information on political history: "Accounting texts indirectly refer to political events when, for example, they record gifts for foreign messengers, dowries of Mari princesses marrying foreign rulers, weapons for military campaigns, or the king’s presence in conquered cities."

The majority of the palace's permanent residents were women, as a significant part of the royal palace is as a "harem," whose access is controlled by guards. Women entered the palace in various ways: royal wives through diplomatic marriages (they often appear to have been of foreign origin); concubines or musicians might be presented as gifts by another king or high-ranking official; and military victories resulted in the capture of enemy women, particularly those from the harems of defeated kings. This female population was placed under the authority of a queen: at the beginning of Zimri-Lim’s reign, this was his mother Addu-duri, and after her death, it was his wife Shibtu. The hierarchy among the women of the palace was largely determined by their relationship to the king and could change over time: his wives held the highest ranks, followed by his concubines. The palace musicians, divided into several groups, must also have included, at least in part, royal concubines. The king’s unmarried sisters and daughters also held important positions. Young children, including the king’s sons, also lived in the harem. The servants in this sector were also women (there is no confirmed evidence of eunuchs): maids serving directly under the wives and concubines, chambermaids, wet nurses, cooks, millers, as well as stewards and female scribes who managed the accounts of this sector.

About (queen) Beltum’s nanny (ummum) who came here from Qatna: Had only this woman, who raised Beltum since her youth and knew her ways, been kept away from her when Beltum was leaving Qatna! However, she was sent to Mari with Beltum; yet she knows nothing about palace operation. Because of this unreliable woman who now serves my lady, during the siesta, when the palace’s bolt was set, she had her bring out songstresses to the temple of Ištar during šurārum-ceremony. Beltum suffered a sunstroke when in the Multicolor Court and she has been ill ever since. However, now my lord should not be distressed in the least; her illness is less dangerous now than ever previously. After sending this note, I will await four more days and then send a full report to my lord.

The Mari tablets also provide subtantial information on food and banquets in the royal palace. The most significant group of administrative texts, consisting of approximately 1,300 accounting tablets, are known as the "king’s meals" (naptan šarrim). They consist of short notes listing the plant-based foodstuffs drawn from the palace stores for the king's meals (these are not complete "menus"), along with their quantities, the total, and the date.

The royal banquet received considerable attention due to the many political issues surrounding it. It is in this context that issues of etiquette and protocol surrounding royal banquets come to light: the seating arrangement of guests is highly symbolic, since proximity to the king was a mark of honor (and an opportunity to speak with him directly), as was sharing his food. Furthermore, politeness and homage to a high-ranking figure were carefully studied.

The king also maintained musicians, both men and women (the latter being by far the more numerous), who were required to perform at banquets (he could also hire street performers and actors) but also (and perhaps primarily?) for religious rituals. He had a "head musician" who organized this aspect of court life and managed a large staff as well as a "conservatory" where apprentice musicians were trained. This head musician, a man named Warad-ilishu, was also entrusted with diplomatic missions (notably in negotiations for marriages), indicating that he was a key figure at court. A number of the female musicians were the king's concubines (some bore him children), although it is undeniable that they were specialists in the art of music.

=== Religion ===
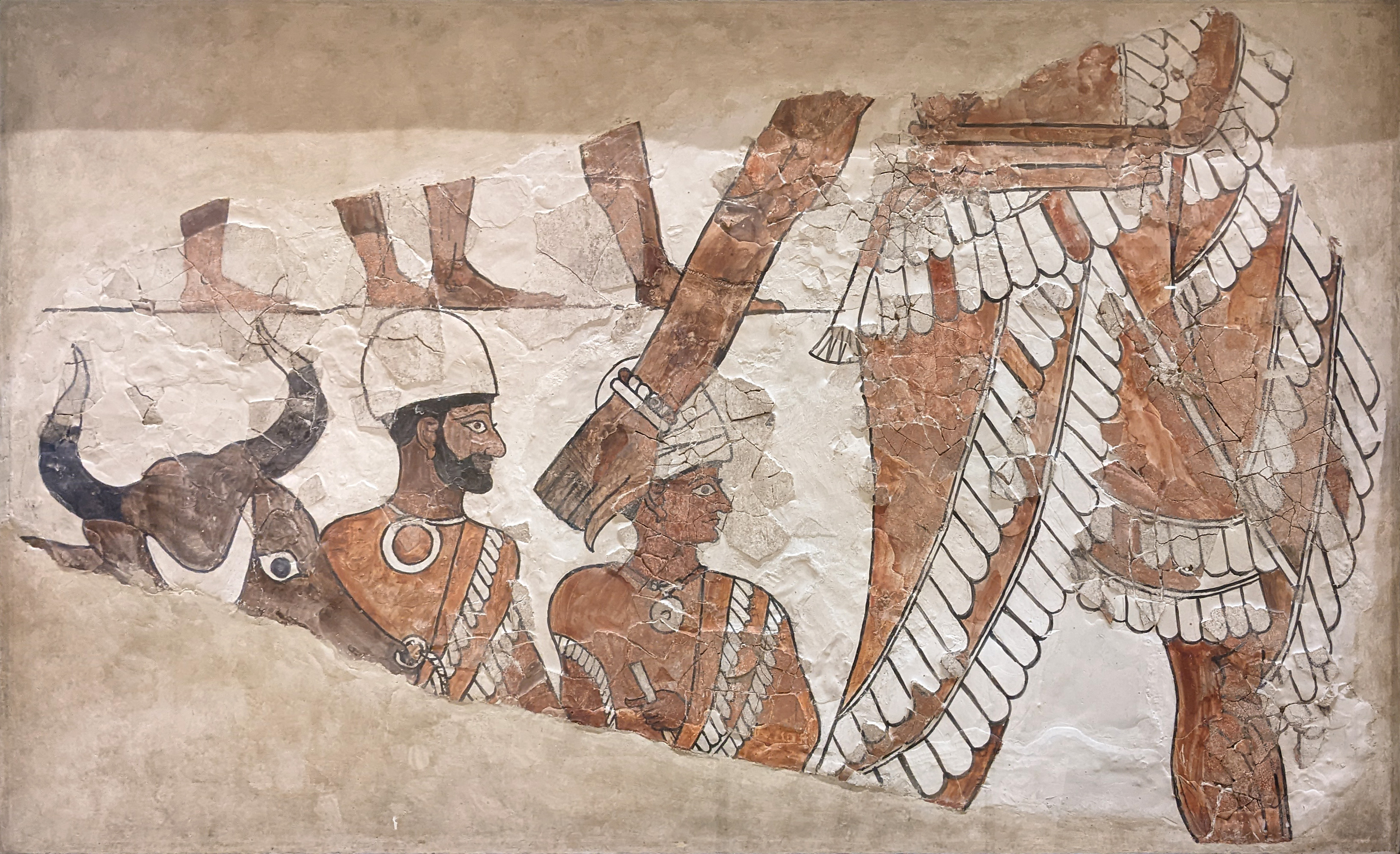
Fragment of the mural known as the "sacrificial scene" or "the organizer of the sacrifice," from the royal palace of Mari. A full-length figure, the king, guides the attendants and a sacrificial bull. Louvre Museum.

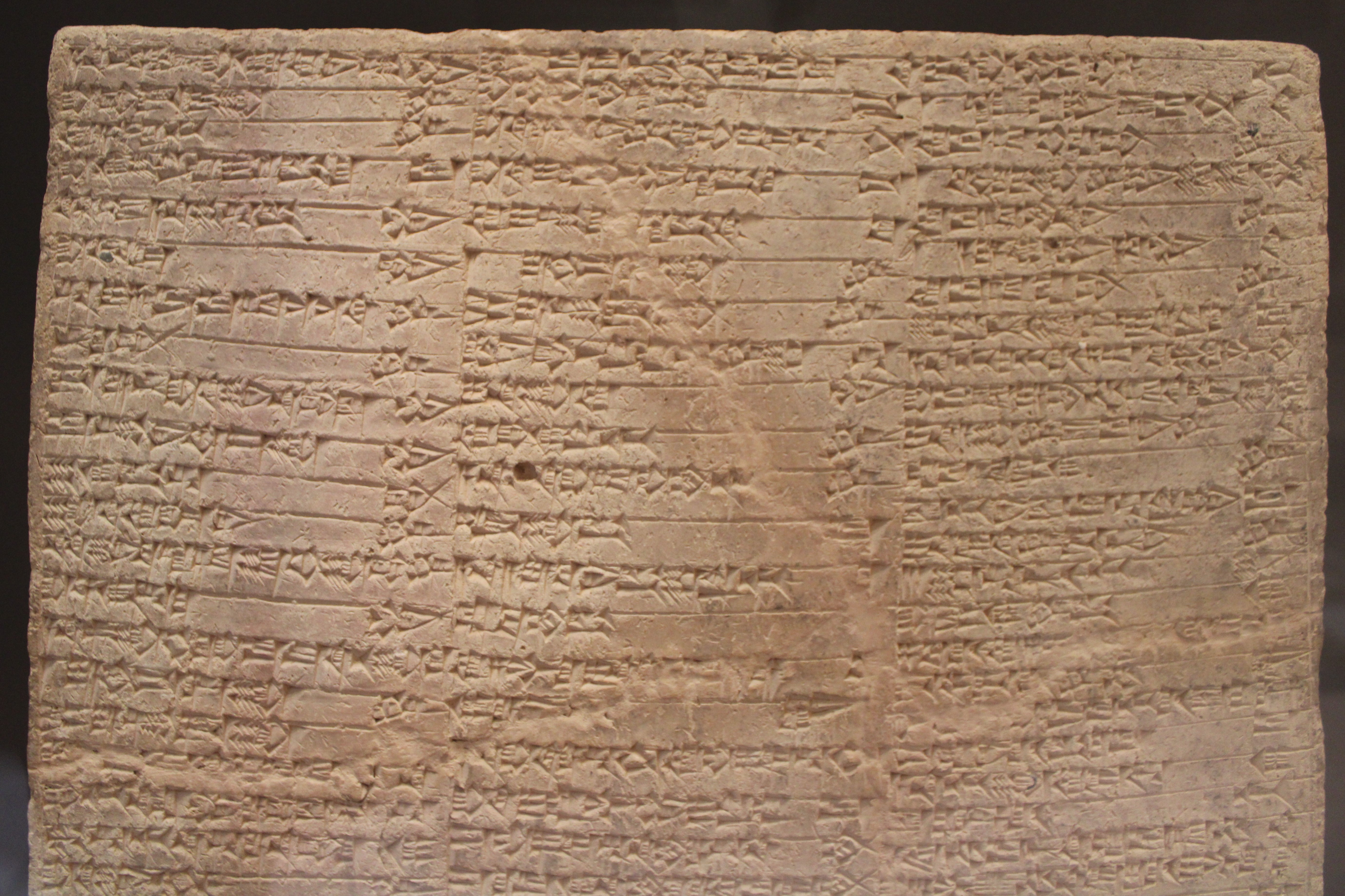
Foundation brick commemorating the reconstruction of the temple of Shamash in Mari by Yahdun-Lim. Louvre Museum.

The Mari texts are a major source on the religious practices of the Kingdom of Mari and more broadly ancient Syria.

The major deities worshipped in Mari include Shamash, the city's patron deity; Itūr-Mēr, about whom little is known; and the goddess Ishtar (named Eshtar in this context), whose festival was the city's main religious celebration. The other major deities of the kingdom, associated with sovereignty, are Dagan of Terqa, whose sanctuary is the most important in the region (he also has a major sanctuary at Tuttul), and Ishtar of Der (or Diritum), who appears to have served as the protective goddess of the Zimri-Lim dynasty; the king participated annually in her great festival, in the presence of his vassals, and commemorated his ancestors there.

Tell Yasmah-Addu: Thus speaks Samsi-Addu, your father. In Tuttul there are 14 fattened oxen, 42 transhumant oxen, 26 fattened male sheep, and 2 fattened goats, which have been force-fed. Write to Tuttul. We must load the cattle and sheep and send them downstream for the mourning rite of Dagan.

One of the distinctive features of religion in the Mari region, and more broadly in Syria, is that the gods are represented there not only in the form of statues but also as stones, known as betyls, which may be particularly linked to Bedouin traditions. Perhaps this can be seen as the origin of the practice of not depicting deities in human form, which later emerged in ancient Israel.

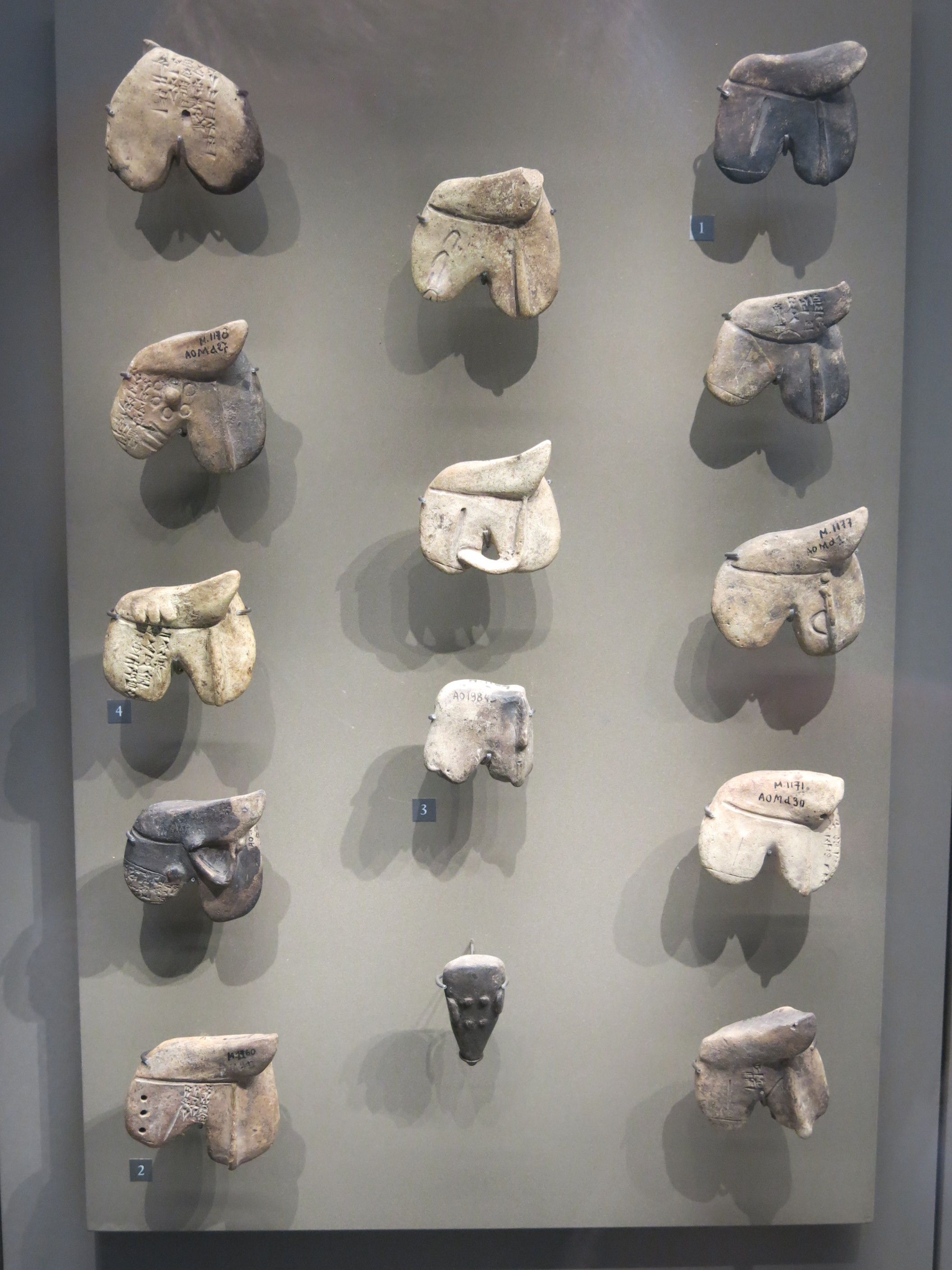
Inscribed liver models used for divination, found in the royal palace. Louvre Museum.

Texts from the royal palace also show that the king was in constant communication with the divine realm, in keeping with the ideology of the time, which was based on the principle of divine election. The king and his servants therefore performed divination, seeking the gods’ advice before making decisions that spanned all areas of their activity: military and diplomatic matters, the conduct of religious worship, the appointment of officials, and even determining the appropriate time to go on a journey, etc. For this purpose, they primarily used extispicy and hepatoscopy, which involved searching for divine messages in the entrails or liver of a lamb. The royal palace has yielded inscribed clay models of divinatory livers, showing examples of liver configurations and the omens they implied. Other forms of divination are attested in the texts but are far less well documented, particularly those involving birds.

In other situations, the gods address the king on their own initiative, through a medium, usually a person associated with their temple, conveying their message either through a dream or through a prophecy proclaimed aloud. The Mari corpus thus provides a significant body of texts on prophecy, which is subsequently found in Assyria and ancient Israel.

To my lord (Yasmah-Addu) speak! Your servant Asqudum (says), "I made extispicies for the well-being of the messengers, and they were bad. I will make (extispicies) for them again, and when the extispicies have come out sound, I will dispatch them. "Further: About scouts of the district of Iksud-Appasu and Habduma-Dagan—no scouts whatsoever are in place. And my lord knows how many dispossessions keep appearing in the offerings of my lord. The (supervision of) scouts is being neglected. And the extispicies made for the well-being of their district are bad.".

Another practice related to communication with the divine that appears in several documents from Mari is the river ordeal: when a dispute arises between two people or two groups and cannot be resolved due to a lack of decisive evidence, the parties may defer to the judgment of the river god of the city of Hit (on the Euphrates, in the southeastern part of the kingdom, which was shared with Babylon during the reign of Zimri-Lim), and undergo a trial involving diving into the river (the exact details of which are not understood). One must succeed in this trial to prove one's right (failure could result in the participant's death). This clearly applies only to the most serious cases, and the king closely monitored these matters.

To my lord speak! Your servant Meptum (says), "About the plunging party of Šub-Ram and Haya-Sumu that my lord dispatched—I dispatched reliable agents with that plunging party, and they first let a woman take the plunge, and she came out. After her, they made an elder take the plunge, and he resolved (the claim of) 80 (dikes of land) inside the god and came out. After him, they made a second woman go down, and she came out. After her, a third woman. The god spat out the third woman. As the elder established 80 (dikes of) field-area and the god spat out the third woman, the men of Haya-Sumu were not willing to let 3 other women take the plunge. They affirmed: ‘City and territory are [not] ours.’ The elder fell to the feet of the men [of] Šub-Ram, (saying), ‘Do not let the other [women] plunge, and they must not die. We shall procure a title guarantee concerning city and territory. In days to come no one must raise a claim (against it). City and territory are Sub-Ram’s.’ The courtiers of Babylon and the [ ] of the city had a title guarantee written down before the agents. Herewith I have dispatched that plunging party to my lord. My lord must ask them.

Funeral rites following a person's death include a wake and lamentations; there are also "mourners"/″wailers″ who are paid to perform funeral lamentations. In the case of a king's death, the mourning period and funeral rites can last for several days. Funerals are also accompanied by gifts for the burial of the deceased.

The commemoration of the dead takes place within an ancestor cult, the kispum, which is observed within the family and consists primarily of a meal involving both the living and the dead, where the most important act is the breaking of bread. As is often the case, this ritual is best known in connection with the royal family, which honors its dynastic ancestors, tracing them back to "those who lived in tents"—a reminder of the Amorite kings’ nomadic origins—as well as the ancient kings of Mari. Administrative texts indicate that the offerings take place twice a month, at the beginning and in the middle of the month. A ritual text from the time of Yasmah-Addu provides a list of the various sacrifices to be performed during the kispum without detailing the exact sequence of events. Other offerings, which take place once a month at the same time as the first kispum (called ana maliki) are dedicated to deceased members of the royal family who were not kings. Texts also document a commemorative celebration for the dead, (h)idirtum, which also takes the form of a meal and probably takes place once a year.

=== Diseases and medicine ===
The Mari letters also address topics related to health and medicine, focusing on their social and cultural aspects rather than technical ones. The topics that stand out are primarily those of interest to the king and concern the elite first and foremost: serious illnesses and deaths among members of the royal family or its administration, epidemics and epizootics occurring in the kingdom, and the search for doctors and effective remedies. According to ancient beliefs, diseases were inflicted by the gods to humans, particularly in order to punish them for impiety or some other wrongdoing. A disease might be described as the "hand of the god," and an epidemic as a god "devouring" the land and its people. Omens were therefore commonly used to ask the god about the origin of a disease and its eventual outcome. When it was believed that a god had decreed a person's death, the typical response was simply to let them die. This did not prevent them from taking measures to isolate and quarantine people and communities affected by contagious diseases in order to prevent their spread. Descriptions of symptoms in the letters are generally brief, as evidenced by the frequent use in the texts of the generic term simmum, which referred to various types of diseases, particularly those affecting the skin. The medical specialist is the asūm, which can be translated as "doctor," "physician" or "surgeon" (and also "veterinarian," since they sometimes treated animals). Kings employ them and seek to attract the most competent. They specialized in the preparation of various medical remedies (bandages, poultices, ointments, potions) and the knowledge of medicinal plants, as well as the performance of surgical procedures; some may also have been a kind of magnetizer.

God has relented all over the land. (He struck) from the 25th day of (Abum, xi) through the close of the 5th day of Tirum (xii). Anyone ill who was struck dissipated. On Tirum 10, I have had omens taken on burying the heap (of corpses), and God answered (favorably). All of them that . . . buried the corpse (of a related dead). On the 14th of Tirum, diviners and lamenters purified the city. God is now done with the land. My lord should know this.

A servant attending me is ill. An abscess has broken out below his ear. Two physicians attending me are bandaging him, but the lesion is not changing. Now then, my lord should send me either a physician from Mardaman or an experienced (ḫakamum) physician to inspect the lesion and to bandage him, so as to shorten its duration.

=== Significance to Assyriological and Biblical studies ===
The Royal Archives of Mari are the largest corpus of texts from a Syro-Mesopotamian palace, and are therefore among the most significant in the ancient Near East. They provide insight into a turbulent period in the region's history and document major figures in Mesopotamian history (most notably Samsi-Addu and Hammurabi), extending far beyond the kingdom's borders, as their scope ranges from the Levant and the eastern Mediterranean (Ugarit, Hazor; mentions of Cyprus and Crete) all the way to western Iran (Susa and Elam) and the Gulf (Dilmun). Beyond political and diplomatic life, these texts cover subjects as diverse as religion, material culture, and customs. They are supplemented by corpora from other more or less contemporary sites (Terqa, Tuttul, Tell Leilan, Tell Rimah, etc.), offering a considerable body of information overall.

The contribution of the Mari archives to biblical studies lies primarily in the possible comparisons between prophetic and diplomatic practices, or the nomadic way of life. According to J. Sasson: "Mari contributes best to Hebrew studies by furnishing a model for evaluating the social experiment that became Israel."

== Archaic texts ==
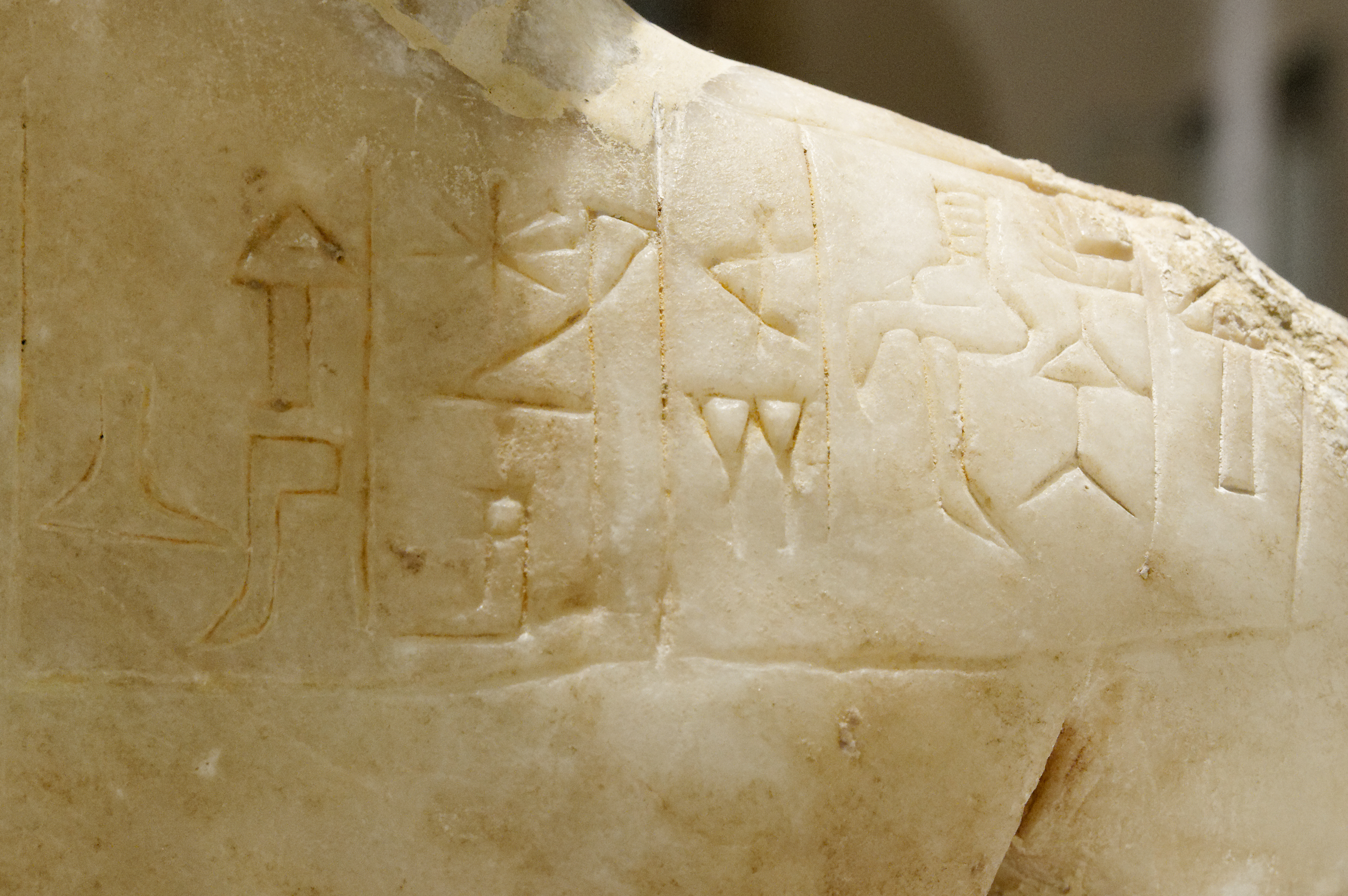
Inscription on the shoulder of the statuette of Ebih-Il. Louvre Museum.

Other tablets, far fewer in number, date from around 2300 BC, several centuries before the royal archives of Mari. They were unearthed in the strata of City II of Mari, which is referred to in standard terminology as Early Dynastic III (ED III) or "Pre-Sargonic." They provide limited but useful information about the kingdom of Mari during this period of its history, when it was one of the most powerful states of Syria along with Ebla and Nagar.

These are administrative documents found in several buildings of the period (the Pre-Sargonic Palace, the Red House, a Building with artisanal facilities, and the High Priest's House). They are primarily written in Sumerian logograms, but they also include phonetically written words that refer to the Semitic language spoken locally. They date from the reigns preceding the end of the kingdom. It is unclear to which administrative body they belonged, as there is no clear indication of a connection to the royal palace, but they do provide some information regarding the institutions common at the time: they mention the "palace" (é-gal), the "house of the king" (é lugal)—these were offices or "Houses" specializing in a specific area of jurisdiction. The archives of the House of the High Priest, a building in the temple district, thus record grain offerings for religious rituals, while those of the Building with artisanal facilities, where various economic activities took place, document the management of donkeys and boats, indicating an activity related to land and river transportation and trade.

Inscriptions carved on statues date from the same period. They reveal the names of several kings and their close associates—that is, the kingdom's elite. The statue of Ishqi-Mari is the only one depicting a king; the others depict the king's wives, sons, or servants, naming them. They bear the title "king (lugal) of Mari," to which is sometimes added that of "grand vicar (ensí-gal) of the god Enlil." Several court offices are present, such as that of "captain" (nu-banda, a military command position) Ebih-Il and the "head singer" (nar-gal) Ur-Nanshe.

== Bibliography ==
- Arkhipov, Ilya (2022). "The Middle East after the Fall of Ur: From Assur to the Levant". In Karen Radner, Nadine Moeller and Daniel T. Potts (ed.). The Oxford History of the Ancient Near East, Volume 2: From the End of the Third Millennium BC to the Fall of Babylon. New York: Oxford University Press. pp. 310–407.
- Briend, Jacques; Tassin, Claude, eds. (2008). "Tell Hariri / Mari" (PDF). Supplément au Dictionnaire de la Bible (in French). Vol. 14. Letouzey & Ané., col. 213–456
- Charpin, Dominique (2019). "Les archives royales de Mari, 85 ans de recherche". Claroscuro. Revista del Centro de Estudios sobre Diversidad Cultura (in French). 18 (2): 1–46.
- Durand, Jean-Marie (1992). "Mari (B) Texts". In David Noel Freedman (ed.). Anchor Bible Dictionary. Vol. 4. London and New York: Doubleday.
- Durand, Jean-Marie (1997–2000). Les Documents épistolaires du palais de Mari (in French). Paris: Le Cerf. (3. volumes)
- Guichard, Michaël (1997). "Mari Texts". In Meyers, Eric M. (ed.). The Oxford Encyclopedia of Archaeology in the Near East. Translated by Melissa Kaprelian. Oxford: Oxford University Press.
- Heimpel, Wolfgang (2003). Letters to the King of Mari: A New Translation, with Historical Introduction, Notes, and Commentary. Winona Lake: Eisenbrauns.
- Liverani, Mario (2014). "The Mari Age". The Ancient Near East: History, society and economy. London and New York: Routledge. pp. 221–239.
- Margueron, Jean-Claude (2004). Mari : métropole de l'Euphrate au IIIe et au début du IIe millénaire av. J.-C (in French). Paris: Picard.
- Sasson, Jack M. (2015). From the Mari Archives: An Anthology of Old Babylonian Letters. University Park, USA: Penn State University Press.
- Ziegler, Nele; Charpin, Dominique (2003). Florilegium Marianum V, Mari et le Proche-Orient à l'époque amorrite : Essai d'histoire politique (PDF) (in French). Antony: SEPOA.
