= Tura-Dagan =

Tura-Dagan 𒌅𒊏𒀭𒁕𒃶
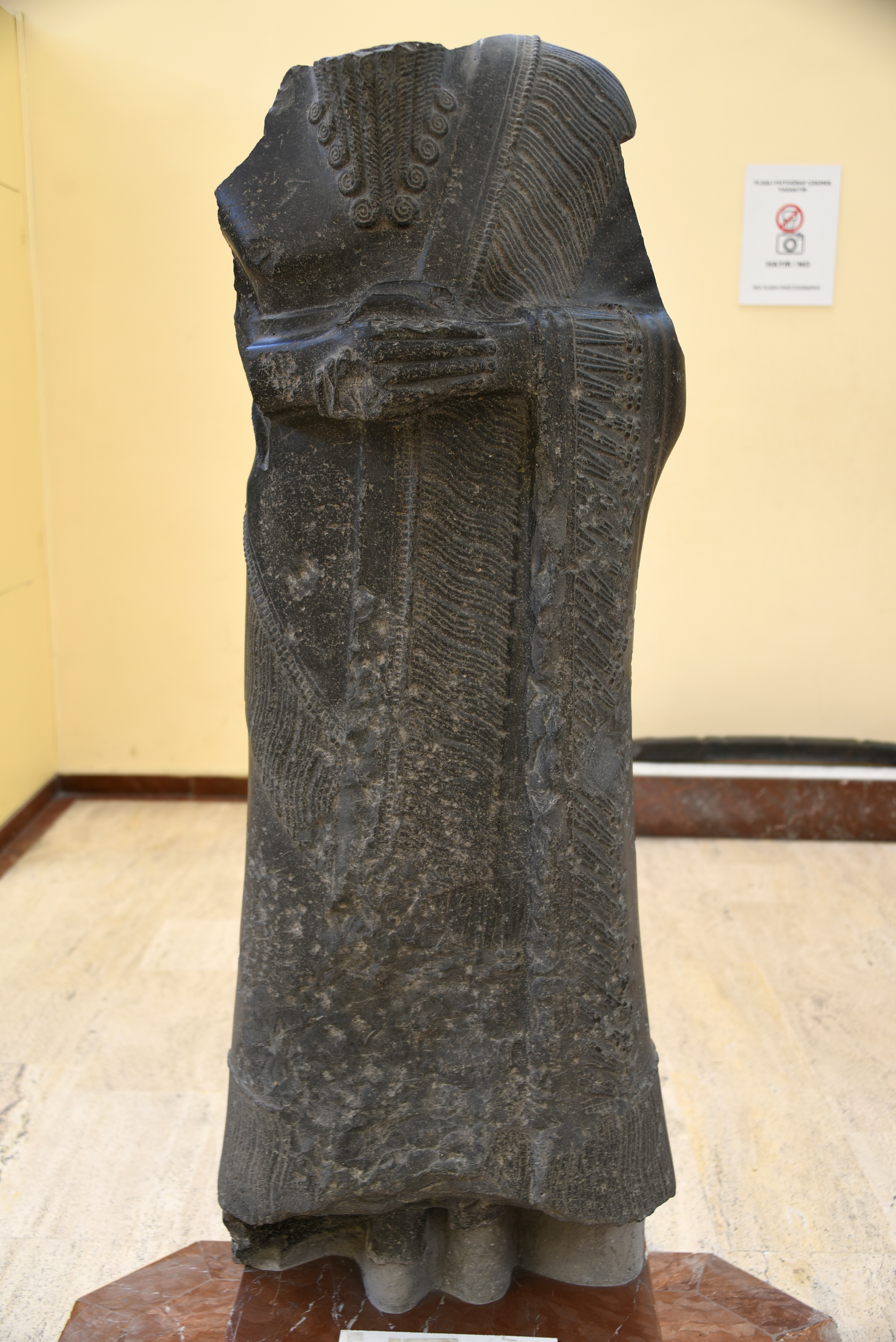
- Statue of Tura-Dagan, Shakkanakku of Mari. Originally from Mari (c. 2072–2050 BC). Museum of the Ancient Orient, Istanbul.

King of Mari
- Reign: c. 2072 - c. 2050 BC
- Predecessor: Ili-Ishar
- Successor: Puzur-Ishtar
- Died: c. 2050 BC
- Issue: Puzur-Ishtar
- Dynasty: Shakkanakku dynasty
- Father: Apil-kin

Location of Mari

Tura-Dagan (𒌅𒊏𒀭𒁕𒃶, Tu-ra-^{D}da-gan; died c. 2050 BC) was a ruler of the city of Mari, northern Mesopotamia during the Ur III period. He was son of Apil-kin, and brother of Ili-Ishar. He held the title of Shakkanakku (military governor), which was borne by all the princes of a dynasty who reigned at Mari in the late third millennium and early second millennium BC. These kings were the descendants of the military governors appointed by the kings of Akkad. He was contemporary of the Third Dynasty of Ur, and probably their vassal.

== Family ==
He was the son of Apil-kin, and younger brother of Ili-Ishar. His sister Taram-Uram had married Shulgi of Ur.

He had a son, who succeeded him, named Puzur-Ishtar.

== Attestations ==
=== Inscriptions ===
The Museum of the Ancient Orient has a statue of Tura-Dagan, but it is headless and the inscription is heavily damaged. Tura-Dagan is also known from various seals and dynastic lists.

A statue of Puzur-Ishtar is known from the Royal Palace of Mari, now in the Museum of the Ancient Orient in Istanbul, with an inscription on the hem of the statue’s skirt mentioning his father Tura-Dagan.

The inscription on the hem of the statue reads:

"Tura-Dagan, prince of the country of Mari, Puzur-Ishtar, the prince, his son, to god [...], lord [...], god [....], for their life, (have offered this statue). For the one who deletes this dedication, may gods Ninni, Dagan and Enki, master of [...], tear down his foundation and destroy his progeny together with his territory"

— Puzur-Ishtar inscription (hem).

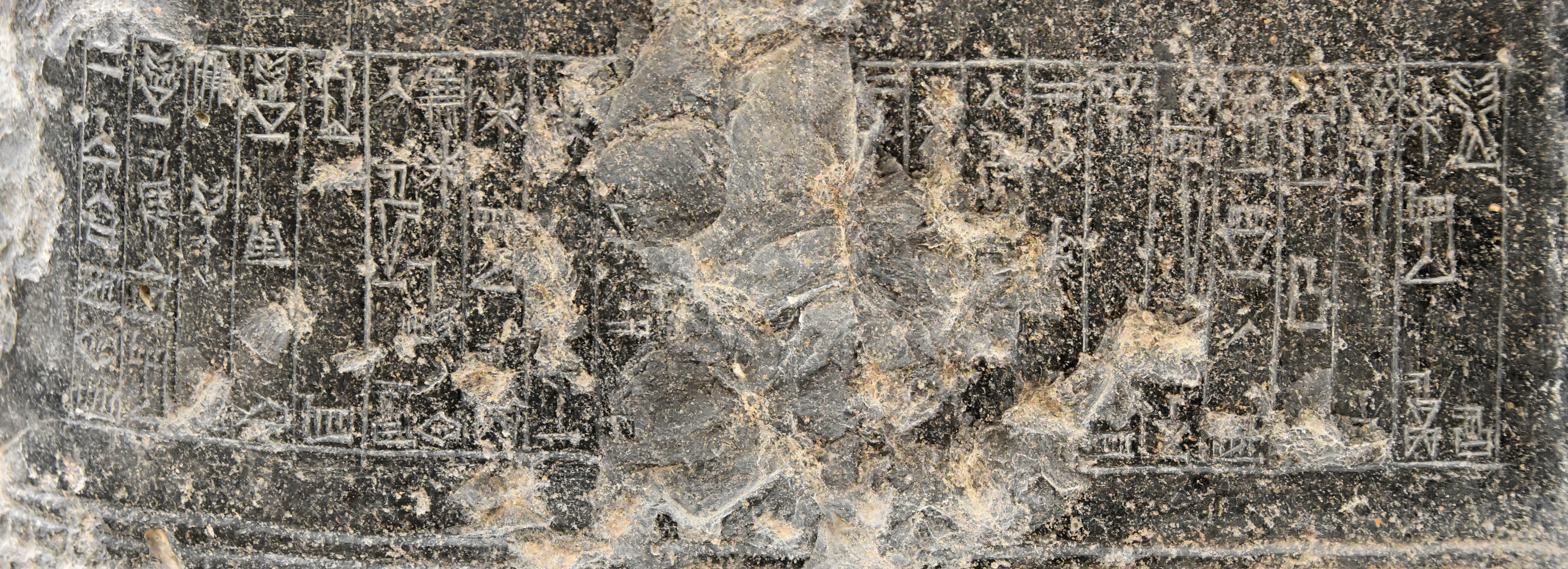
Puzur-Ishtar statue inscription (hem)
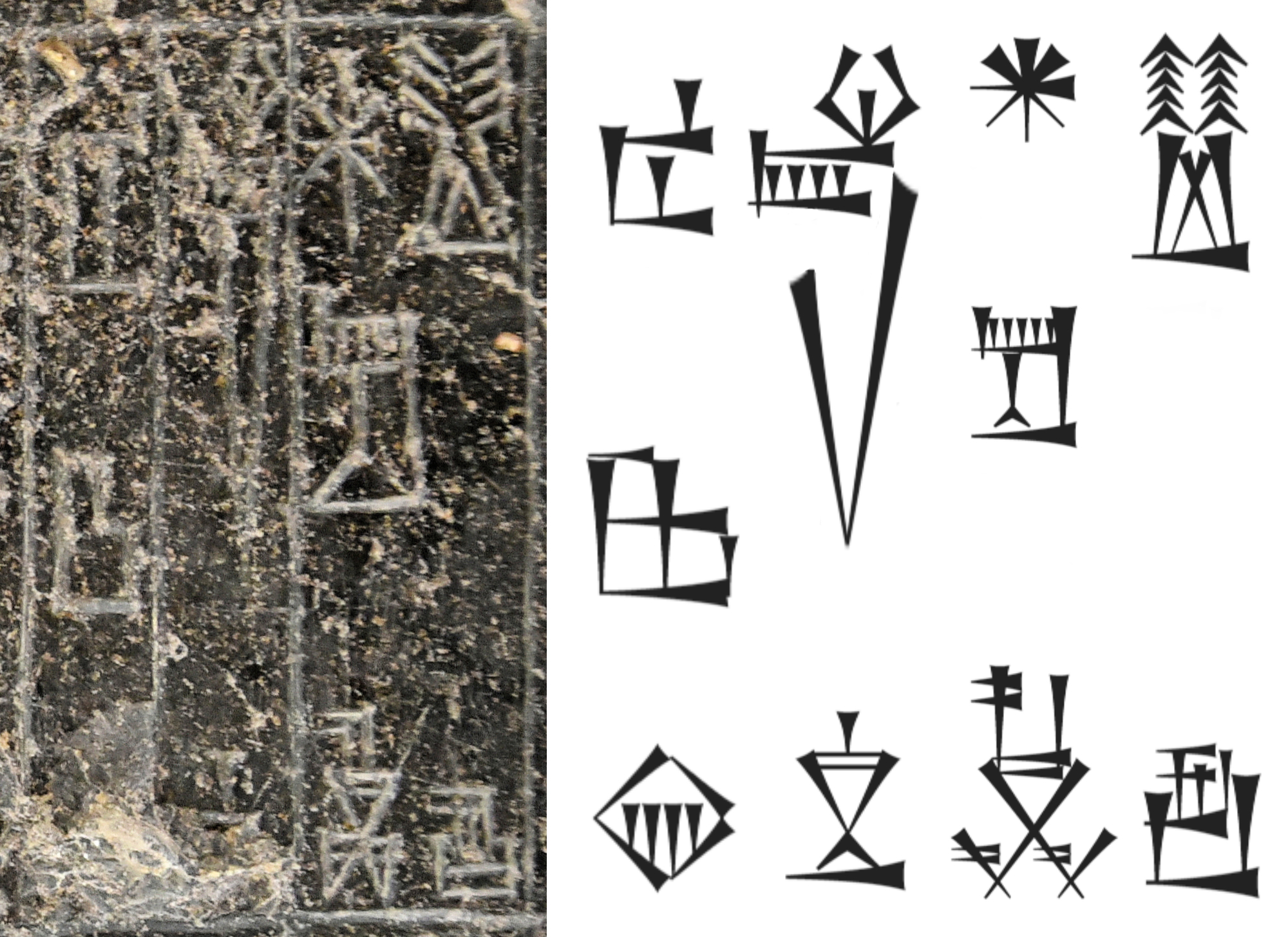
"Tura-Dagan Governor of Mari"
𒌅𒊏𒀭𒁕𒃶 𒄊𒀴 𒈠𒌷𒆠
Tura-Dagan Shakkanakku Mari-ki
on the Statue of Puzur-Ishtar, his son and successor.
Ancient Orient Museum, Istanbul.

Tura-Dagan of Mari
Regnal titles
Preceded by Ili-Ishar	King of Mari c. 2072 - c. 2050 BC	Succeeded by Puzur-Ishtar
