= Puzur-Ishtar =

Puzur-Ishtar 𒆃𒊭𒁹𒁯
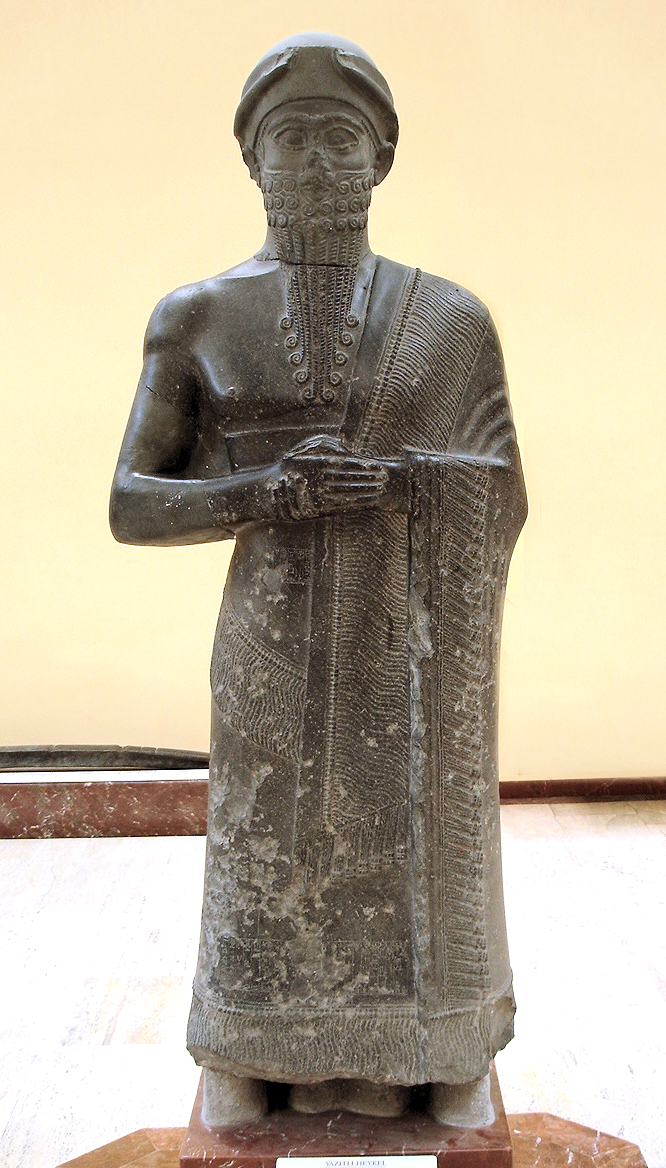
- The Statue of Puzur-Ishtar, Former Governor of Mari. Museum of the Ancient Orient, Istanbul.

King of Mari
- Reign: c. 2050 – c. 2025 BC
- Predecessor: Tura-Dagan
- Successor: Hitlal-Erra
- Died: c. 2025 BC
- Issue: Hitlal-Erra and Hanun-Dagan
- Dynasty: Shakkanakku dynasty
- Father: Tura-Dagan

Location of Mari

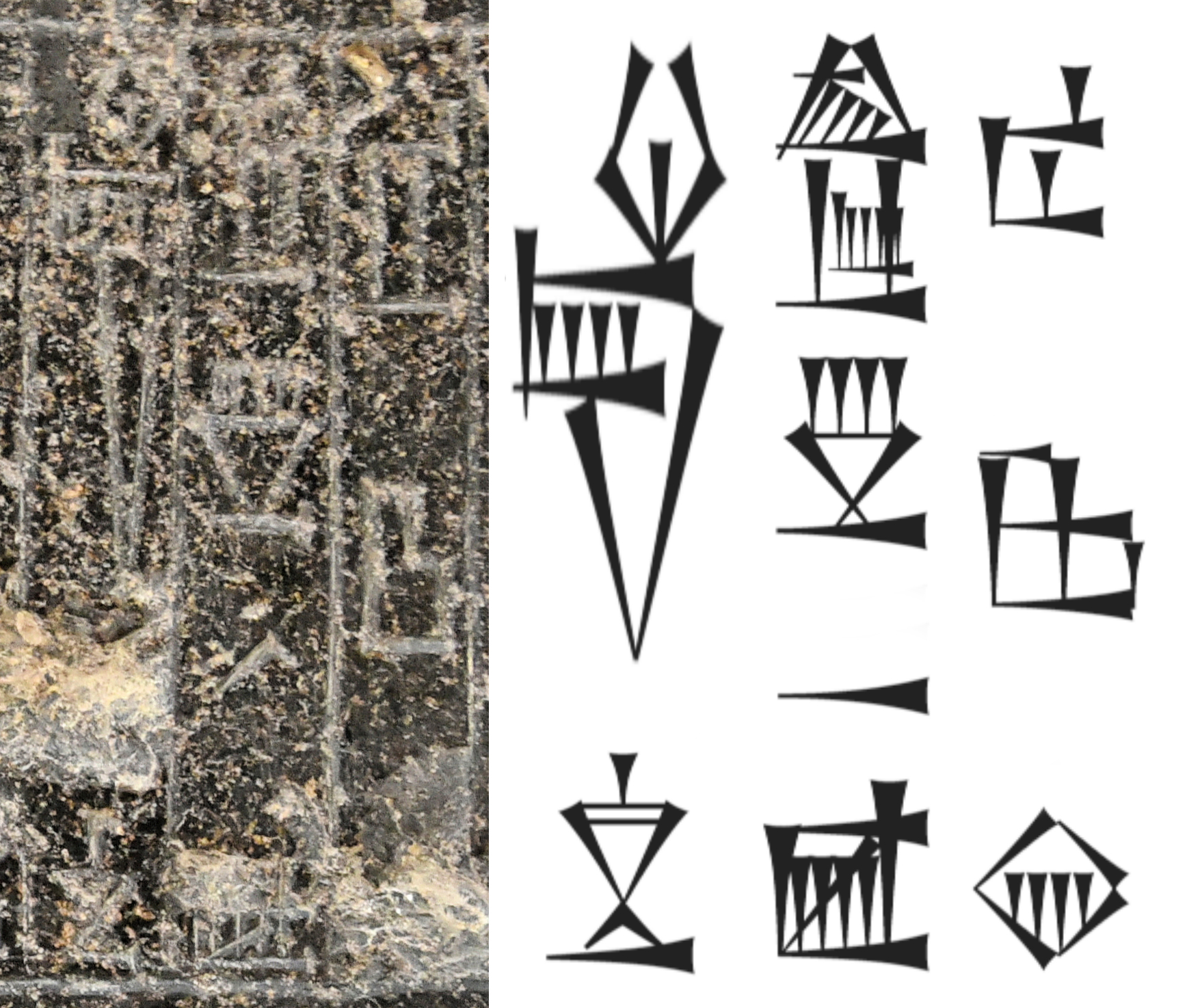
"Mari, Governor Puzur-Ishtar" 𒈠𒌷𒆠 𒆃𒊭𒁹𒁯 𒄊𒀴 Mari-ki Puzur-Ishtar Shakkanakku (Puzur-Ishtar statue inscription)

Puzur-Ishtar (𒆃𒊭𒁹𒁯, Puzur4-Eš4-tár, died c. 2025 BC) was a ruler of the city of Mari, northern Mesopotamia, after the fall of Akkad. He was contemporary of the Third Dynasty of Ur, and probably their vassal.

He had several sons, who succeeded him, Hitlal-Erra and Hanun-Dagan.

== Statue ==
A statue of him is known from the Royal Palace of Mari. Statues of gods and past rulers were the most common among statues unearthed at the Palace of Zimri-Lin. The title of Shakkanakku (military governor) was borne by all the princes of a dynasty who reigned at Mari in the late third millennium and early second millennium BC. These kings were the descendants of the military governors appointed by the kings of Akkad.

The statue of Puzur-Ishtar once stood in one of the sanctuaries of the Palace of Zimri-Lim, but was discovered in the museum of Nebuchadrezzar’s palace at Babylon (604-562 BC), where it was likely transported as a trophy. The inscription on the hem of the statue’s skirt mentions Puzur-Ishtar, Sakkanakku of Mari, and also mentions his brother the priest Milaga. Horned caps are usually limited to divine representations in Mesopotamian art but they do not occur on depictions of kings during the Ur III period, therefore it is considered that perhaps the horns of divinity on Puzur-Ishtar’s cap qualified him (to the Babylonian soldiers) as a god to be carted home as the ultimate symbol of their victory over the people of Mari.

== Inscriptions ==
The inscription on the arm of the statue reads:

"Puzur-Ishtar, prince of the country of Mari, Milga the priest his brother"

— Puzur-Ishtar inscription (arm).

The inscription on the hem of the statue reads:

"Tura-Dagan, prince of the country of Mari, Puzur-Ishtar, the prince, his son, to god [...], lord [...], god [....], for their life, (have offered this statue). For the one who deletes this dedication, may gods Ninni, Dagan and Enki, master of [...], tear down his foundation and destroy his progeny together with his territory"

— Puzur-Ishtar inscription (hem).

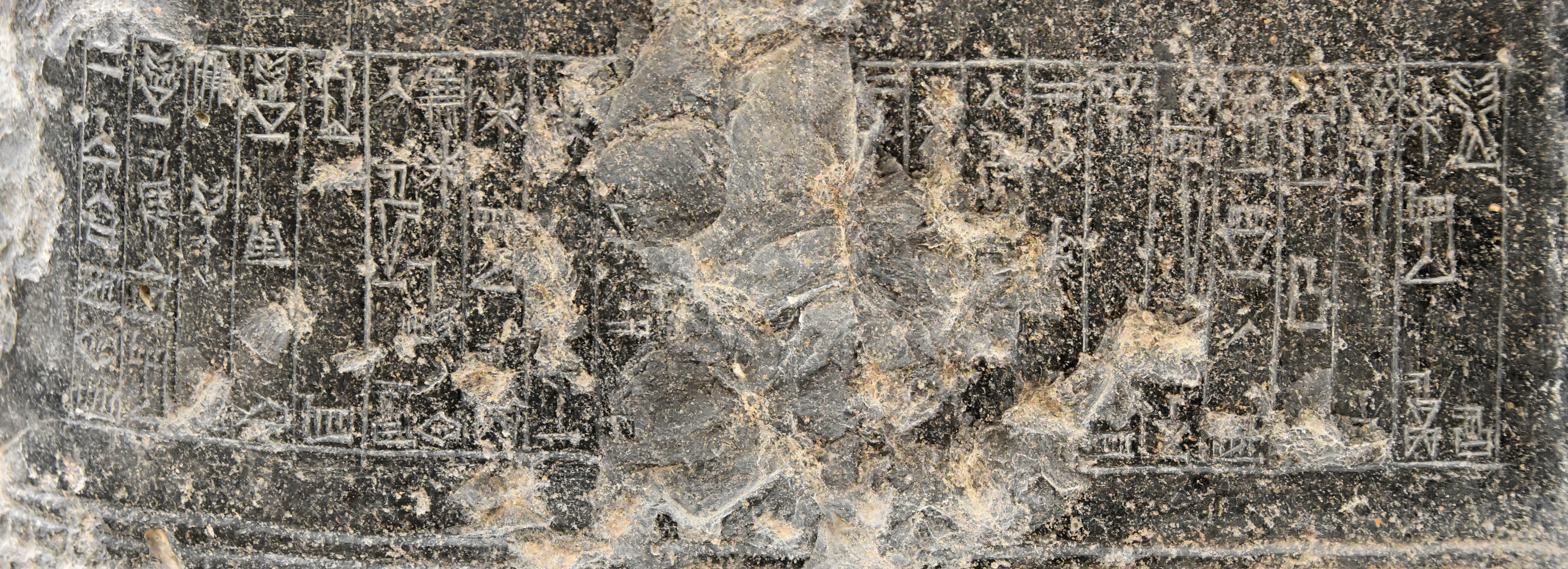
Puzur-Ishtar statue inscription (hem)

== Other statues ==
A second statue of Puzur-Ishtar is known, now in the Museum of Ancient Near East, Berlin.

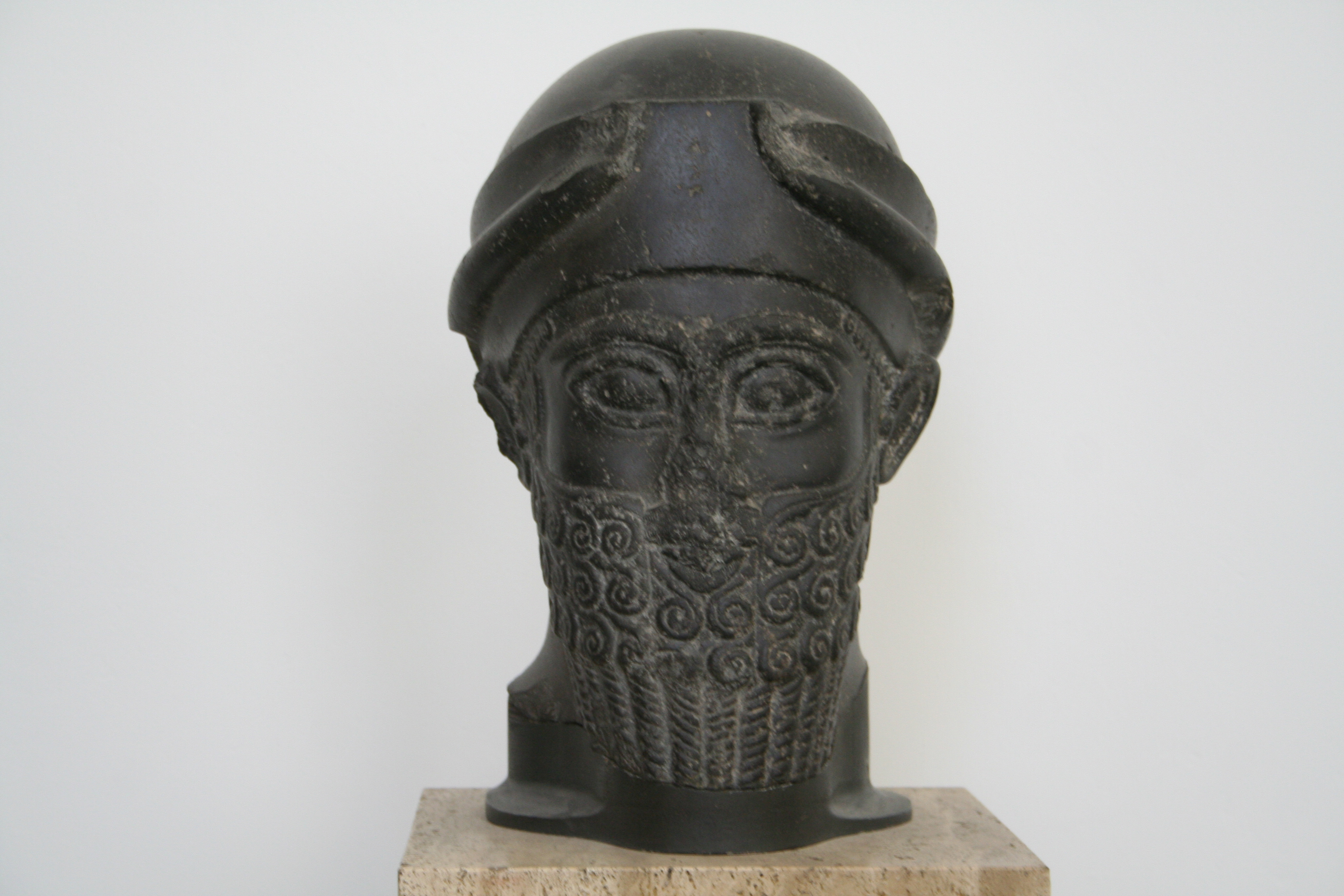
Head of Puzur-Ishtar. Museum of Ancient Near East, Berlin.

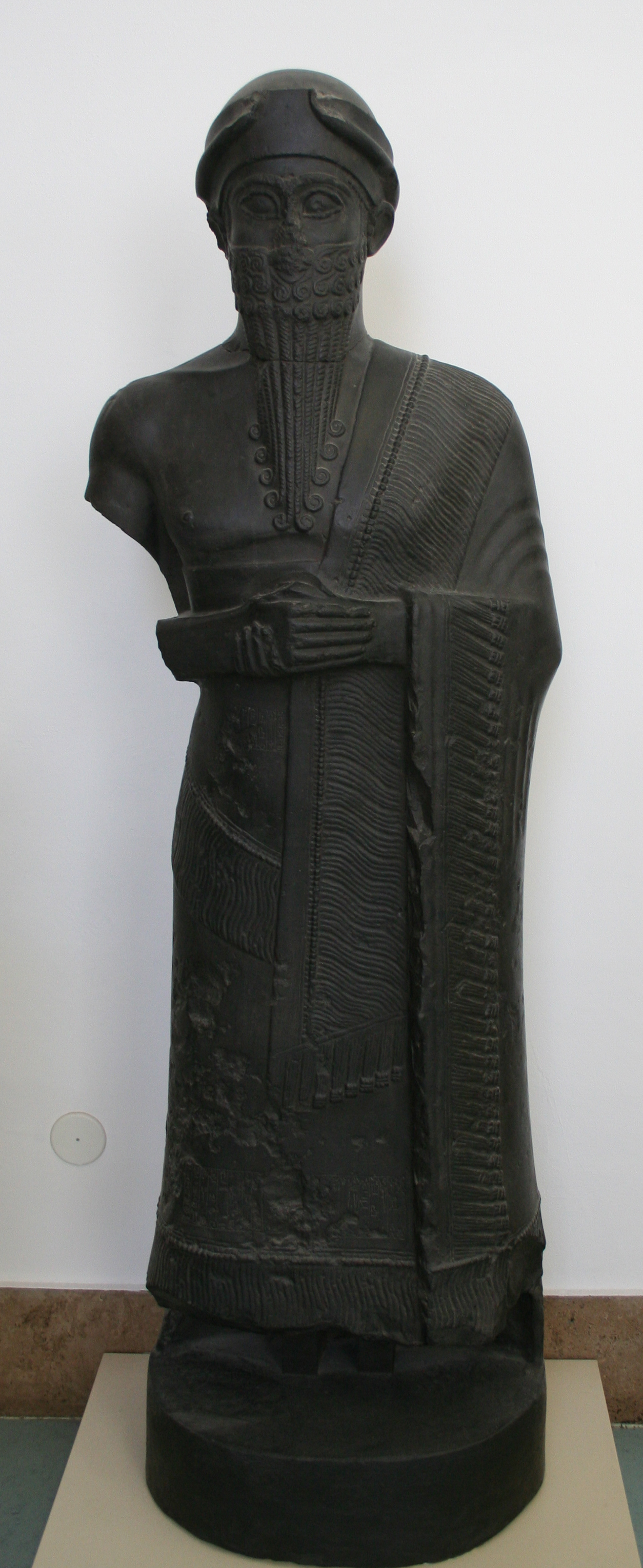
A second statue of Puzur-Ishtar, with inscriptions intentionally damaged in antiquity (only the beginning remains). Museum of Ancient Near East, Berlin.

Shakkanakku Puzur-Ishtar of Mari
Regnal titles
Preceded by Tura-Dagan	King of Mari c. 2050 – c. 2025 BC	Succeeded by Hitlal-Erra
