= Ili-Ishar =

Ili-Ishar 𒀭𒄿𒊬
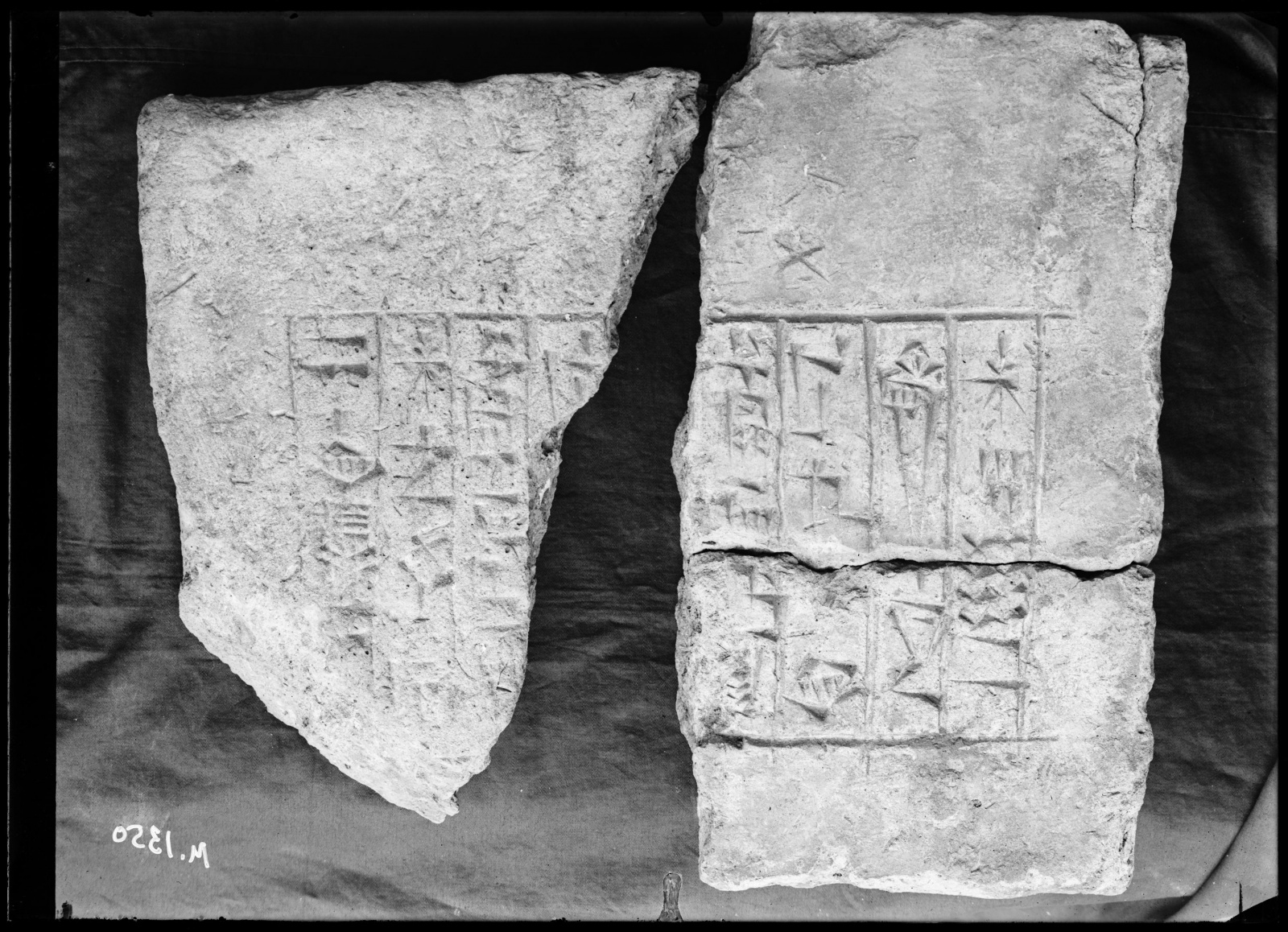
- Brick with inscription of "Ili-Ishar, Shakkanakku of Mari", commemorating a canal-building project

King of Mari
- Reign: c. 2085 - c. 2072 BC
- Predecessor: Iddi-ilum
- Successor: Tura-Dagan
- Died: c. 2072 BC
- Dynasty: Shakkanakku dynasty
- Father: Apil-kin

Location of Mari

Ili-Ishar, also Ilum-Ishar (𒀭𒄿𒊬, Il_{3}-Ishar; died c. 2072 BC), was a ruler of the city of Mari, northern Mesopotamia, after the fall of Akkad c. 2085-2072 BCE. His father was Apil-kin, and his brother was Tura-Dagan, who succeeded him.

He held the title of Shakkanakku (military governor), which was borne by all the princes of a dynasty who reigned at Mari in the late third millennium and early second millennium BC. These kings were the descendants of the military governors appointed by the kings of Akkad. He was contemporary of the Third Dynasty of Ur, and probably their vassal.

Several brick inscriptions in the name of Ili-Ishar have been found in Mari, describing the building of a canal:

"Ilum-išar, šakkanakku of Mari, made the Ḫubur go down to Bāb-Mēr"

— Mari inscriptions of Ili-Ishar.

On some of his inscriptions, Ili-Ishar uses the title dannum' ("the Great") in front of his function Shakkanakku ("Military Governor"), a practice which is first attested at Mari from the inscriptions of Apil-Kin, and was initially introduced by Naram-Sin of Akkad.

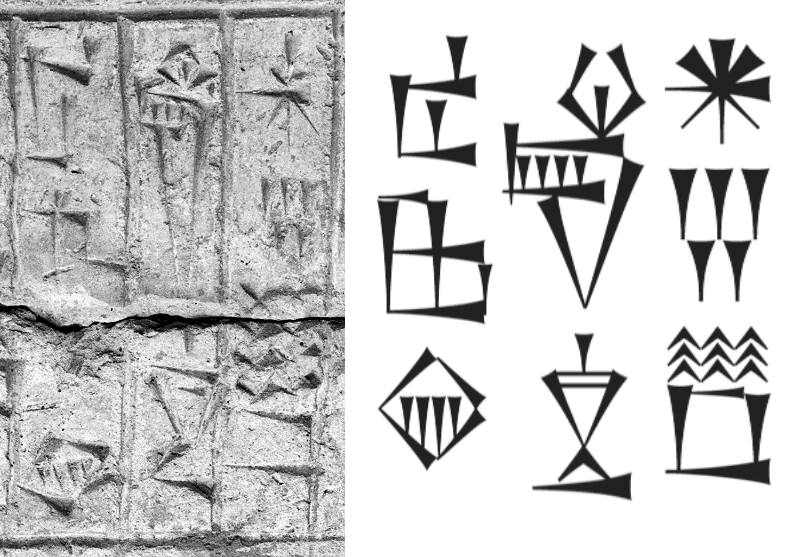
Inscription "Ili-Ishar Shakkanakku Mari-ki" (𒀭𒄿𒊬 𒄊𒀴 𒈠𒌷𒆠, "Ili-Ishar, Military Governor of Mari") on the brick

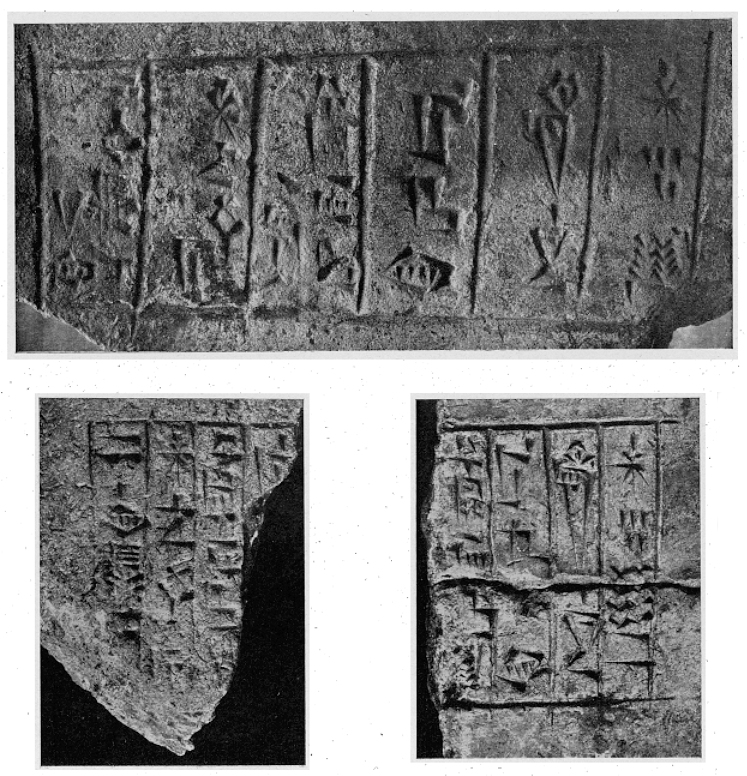
Inscriptions of Ilum-Ishar, excavated in Mari

Ili-Ishar of Mari
Regnal titles
Preceded by Iddi-ilum	King of Mari c. 2085 - c. 2072 BC	Succeeded by Tura-Dagan
