= Iddi-ilum =

Iddi-ilum 𒄿𒋾𒀭
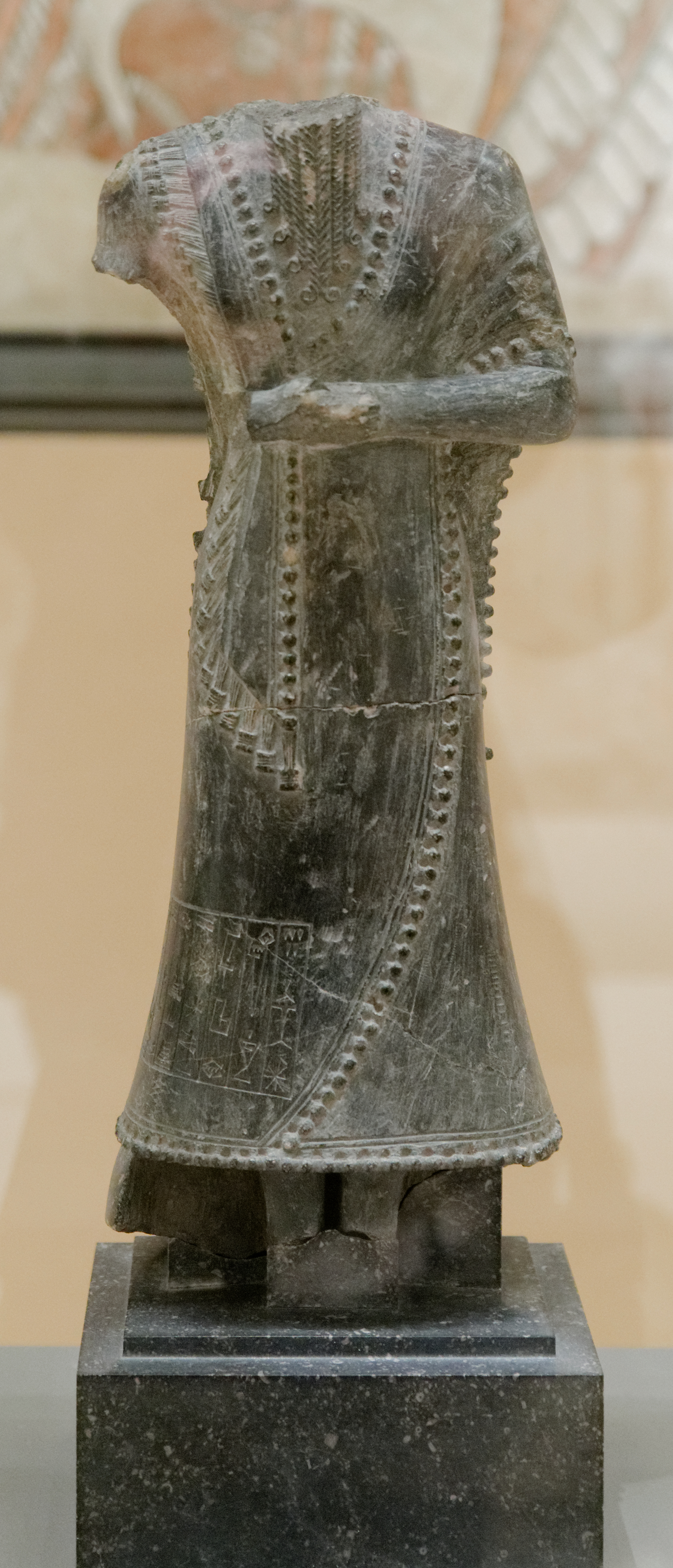
- Statue of Iddi-Ilum

King of Mari
- Reign: c. 2091 - c. 2085 BC
- Predecessor: Apil-kin
- Successor: Ili-Ishar
- Died: c. 2085 BC
- Dynasty: Shakkanakku dynasty

Location of Mari

Iddi-ilum, also Iddi-El or Iddin-El (𒄿𒋾𒀭, i-ti-ilum; died c. 2085 BC), was a military governor, or Shakkanakku, of the ancient city-state of Mari in eastern Syria, following the conquest, the destruction and the control of the city by Akkad.

Iddi-ilum was contemporary of the Third Dynasty of Ur, and probably their vassal.

His headless statue, the Statue of Iddi-Ilum was discovered at the Royal Palace of Mari during excavations directed by French archaeologist André Parrot. The statue was made of soapstone and bears an inscription identifying the figure and dedicating it to the goddess Ishtar or Inanna. The statue is now displayed at the Musée du Louvre in Paris.

The inscription on the statue reads:

"Iddi-ilum, Shakkanakku of Mari, for the goddess Ishtar dedicated a statue of himself. As for the one who removes this inscription, may the goddess Ishtar destroy his progeny"

— Inscription on the statue of Iddi-ilum.

== Statue of Iddi-ilum ==
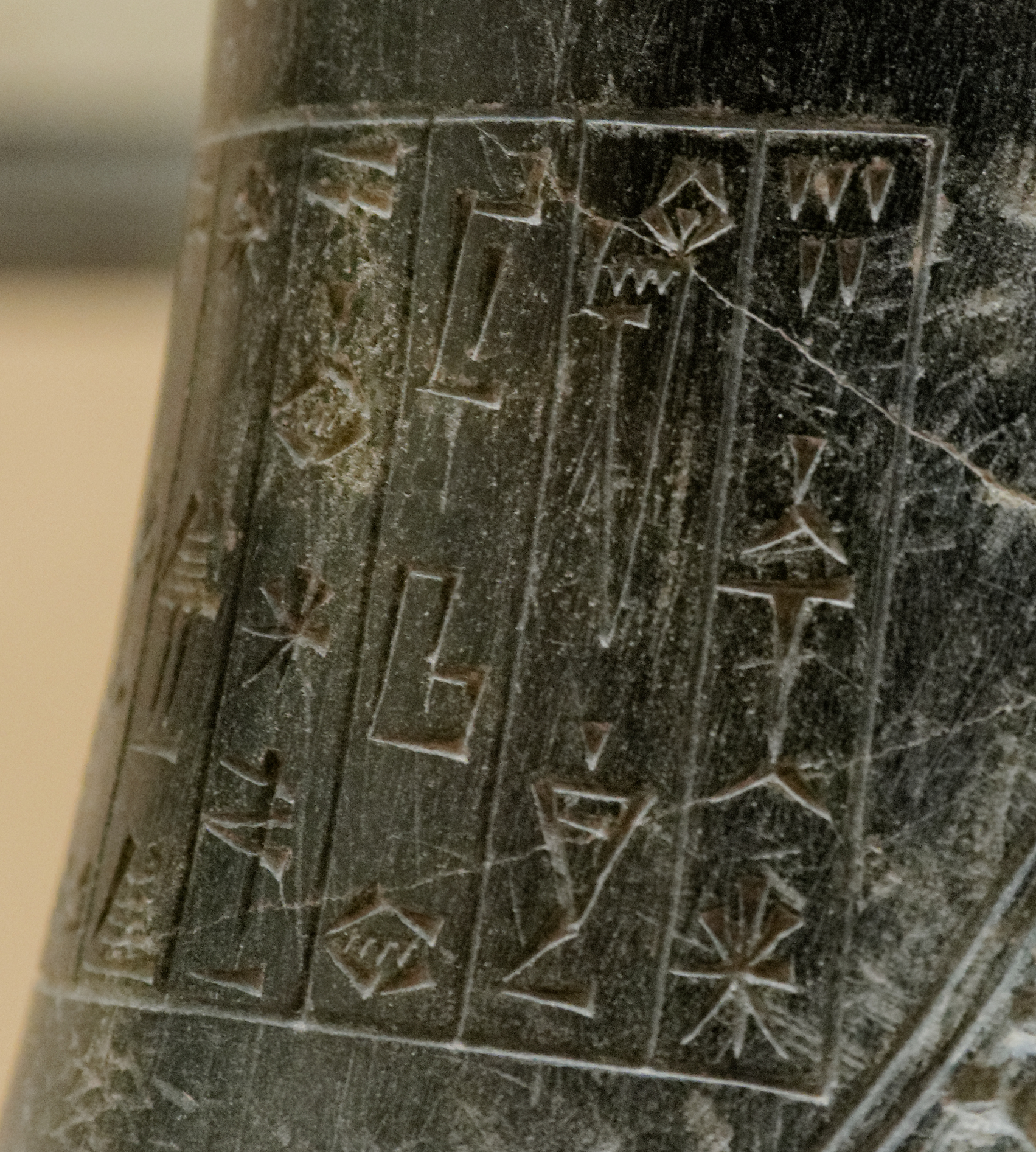
The inscription on the bottom of the statue (front)

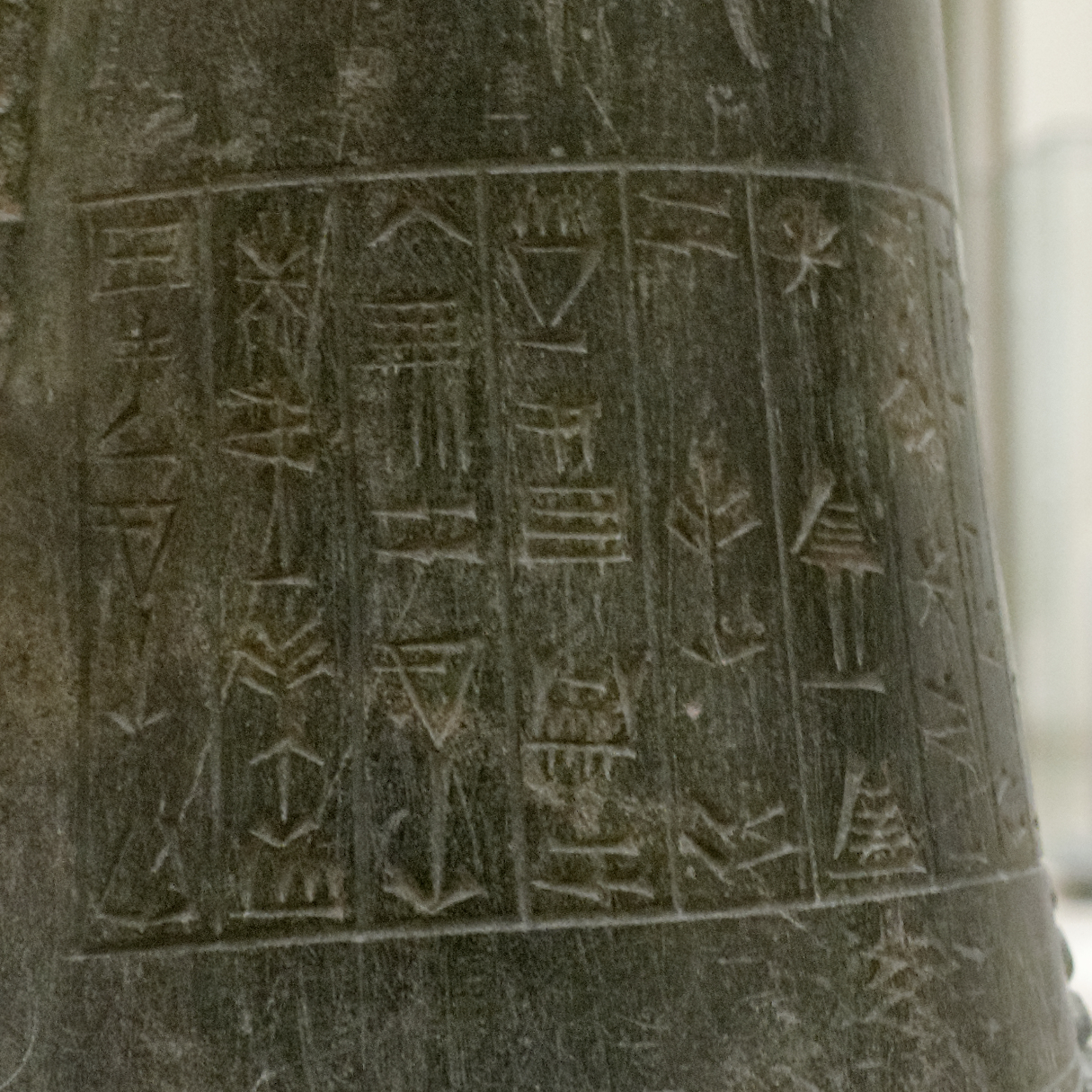
The inscription on the bottom of the statue (back)

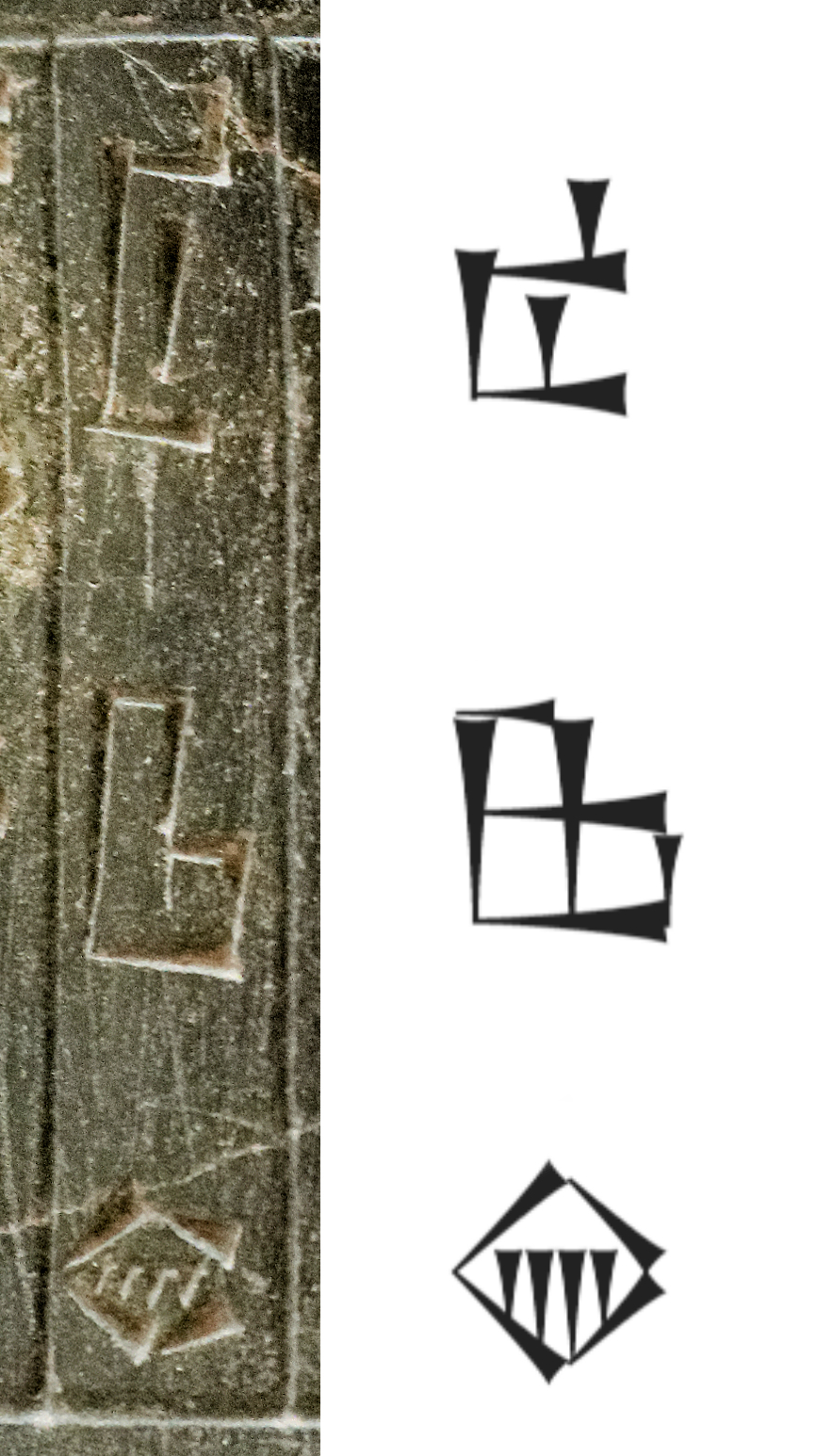
"Country of Mari" (Cuneiform: 𒈠𒌷𒆠, Mari-ki), on the statue of Iddi-Ilum

Apil-kin of Mari
Regnal titles
| Preceded by Apil-kin | King of Mari c. 2091 - c. 2085 BC | Succeeded by Ili-Ishar |
