= Apil-kin =

Apil-kin 𒀀𒉈𒄀

King of Mari
- Reign: c. 2127 - c. 2091 BC
- Predecessor: Ishgum-Addu
- Successor: Iddi-ilum
- Died: c. 2091 BC
- Issue: Ili-Ishar; Tura-Dagan; Taram-Uram
- Dynasty: Shakkanakku dynasty
- Father: Ishgum-Addu

Location of Mari

Apil-kin (𒀀𒉈𒄀 a-pil-gin6; died c. 2091 BC), was a ruler of the city of Mari, northern Mesopotamia, after the fall of Akkad. He was a son of Ishgum-Addu, and ruled 35 years, according to the Shakkanakku Dynasty List. He had two sons, who succeeded him in turn: Ili-Ishar and Tura-Dagan.

He held the title of Shakkanakku (military governor), which was borne by all the princes of a dynasty who reigned at Mari in the late third millennium and early second millennium BC. These kings were the descendants of the military governors appointed by the kings of Akkad. He was contemporary of the Third Dynasty of Ur, and probably their vassal.

He was a contemporary of Ur-Nammu. He had a daughter named Taram-Uram, who became the First Queen of king Shulgi of Ur III. In a dedication, she called herself "daughter-in-law of Ur-Nammu", and "daughter of Apil-kin, Lugal ("King") of Mari", suggesting for Apil-kin a position as a supreme ruler, and pointing to a marital alliance between Mari and Ur.

On some of his inscriptions, Apil-kin uses the title dannum' ("the Great") in front of his function Shakkanakku ("Military Governor"), a practice for which he is the first to be attested at Mari, and which was initially introduced by Naram-Sin of Akkad. Apil-kin and his successors generally used the Akkadian style of royal inscriptions and titulature. It is considered that the Shakkanakkus gained some form of independence and came to be considered as "Kings" from the time of Apil-kin.

One of the inscriptions of Apil-kin, inscribed on a bronze plaque, reads:

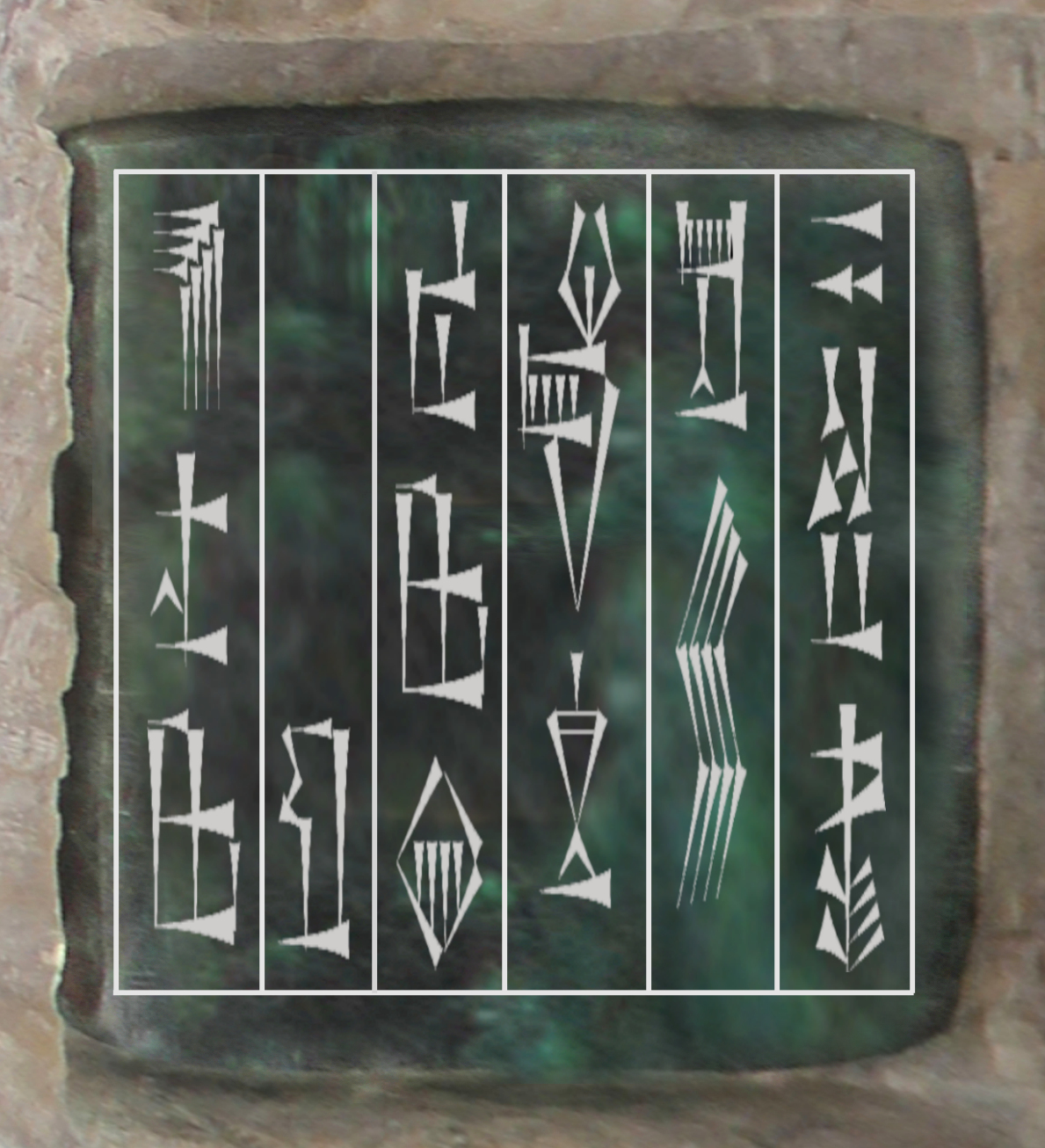
Apil-kin inscription (reconstitution, in standard Sumero-Akkadian cuneiform).

𒀀𒉈𒄀 𒁕𒈝 𒄊𒀴 𒈠𒌷𒆠 𒁶 𒊓𒄷𒌷

a-pil-kin, da-num Shakkanakku ma-ri ki, DIM sa-ḫu-ri

"Apil-kin, the Great Shakkanakku of Mari, built the Sahuri"

— Inscription of Apil-kin.

The "Sahuri" built by Apil-kin is thought to be the name of a building or structure at Mari.

Apil-kin of Mari
Regnal titles
Preceded by Ishgum-Addu	King of Mari c. 2127 - c. 2091 BC	Succeeded by Iddi-ilum
