= Taram-Uram =

Queen consort of Ur
- Tenure: c. 2070 BC
- King: Shulgi
- Spouse: Shulgi
- Father: Apil-kin

Taram-Uram (she who loves Ur; fl. c. 2070 BC) was a king's daughter and queen at the end of the third millennium BC. She was the daughter of the king of Mari, Apil-kin and the wife of Shulgi, second king of the Third Dynasty of Ur. The marriage was most likely arranged by Ur-Nammu, father of Shulgi, to solidify an alliance with Mari meant to guard against the threat of Amorite nomads. When coming to Ur, she must have changed her name to reflect her dedication to her new home. Her birth name is unknown. She was most likely the principal wife of the king in the first years of his reign and might even be the mother of his son and successor Amar-Sin. The latter made death offerings to her father.
