= List of rivers of Syria =

These are the main rivers that flow in or through Syria.

Tributaries are listed under the river into which they flow.

== Flowing into the Mediterranean ==
- Orontes (Asi)
  - Afrin River
  - Karasu
- Nahr al-Kabir al-Shamali, or Northern Great River
- Nahr al-Kabir al-Janoubi, or Southern Great River (On the border between Syria and Lebanon)

== Flowing into the Persian Gulf by the Shatt al-Arab ==
- Tigris (On the border between Syria and Iraq)
- Euphrates
  - Khabur
    - Wadi Radd
    - Wadi Khnezir
    - Wadi Jarrah
    - Jaghjagh River
    - Wadi Khanzir
    - Wadi Avedji
  - Balikh
    - Wadi al-Kheder
    - Wadi Qaramogh
  - Sajur River

== Flowing into endorheic basins ==
Several streams and rivers of Syria flow into endorheic basins or ar tributaries of such streams and rivers.

=== Aleppo basin ===
- Queiq

=== Ghuta oasis ===
- Barada

=== Al-Hijanah Lake ===
- Awaj

=== Dead Sea ===
- Jordan River
  - Yarmuk (On the border between Syria and Jordan)
  - Banias River

== See also ==
- Water resources management in Syria
