= Water resources management in Syria =

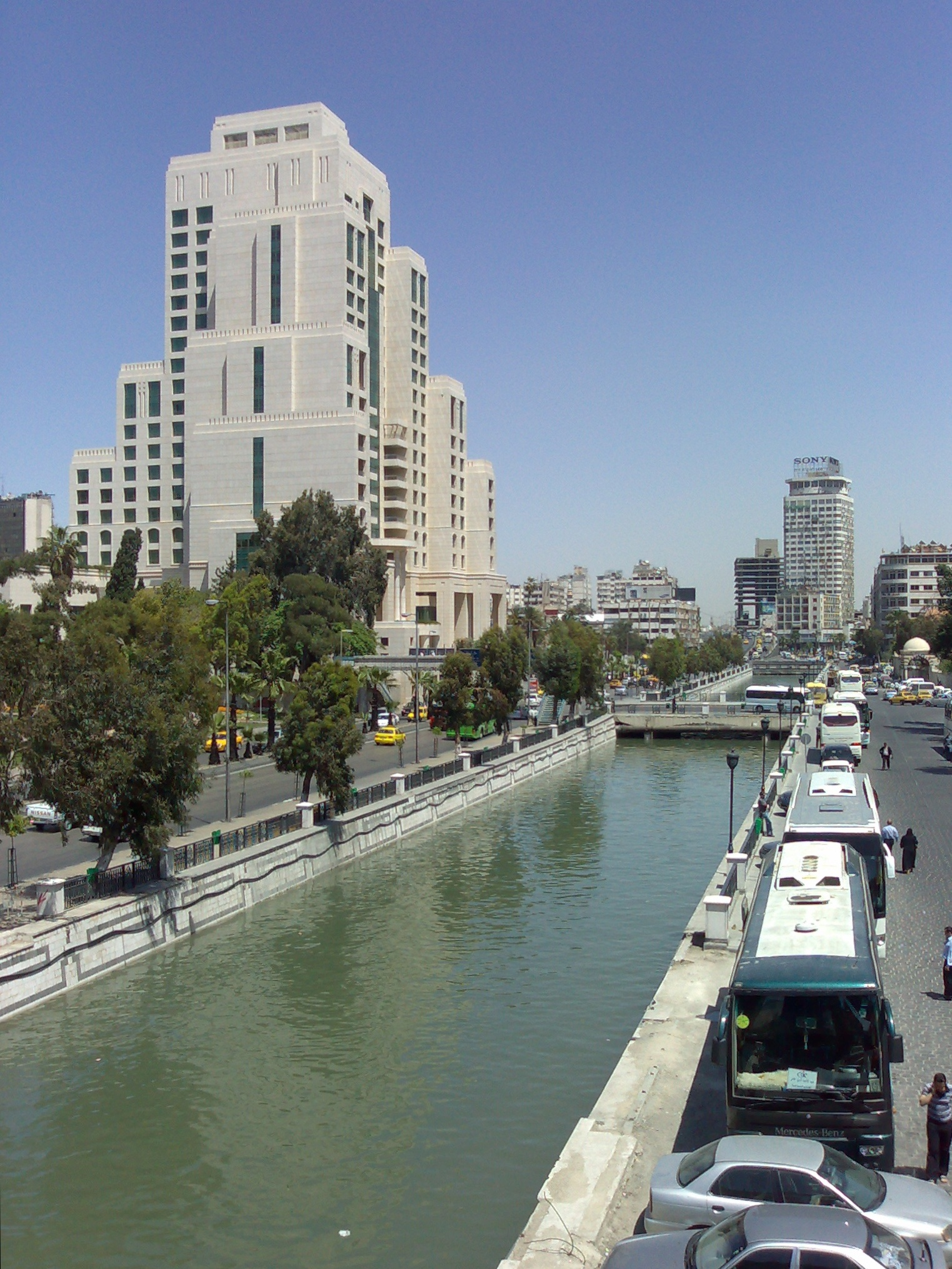
The Barada river, shown here in Damascus in 2009, is the only notable river flowing entirely within Syrian territory

Water resources management in Syria faces several challenges. First, all of the country’s major rivers are shared with neighboring countries, and Syria depends heavily on inflows from Turkey through the Euphrates and its tributaries. Second, high population growth and urbanisation increase the pressure on water resources, resulting in localized groundwater depletion and pollution, for example in the Ghouta near Damascus. Third, there is no legal framework for integrated water resources management. Finally, the institutions responsible for water resources management are highly centralized and fragmented between sectors, and often lack effective regulatory enforcement capacity. Water resources policies have been focused on the construction of dams, the development of irrigated agriculture and occasional interbasin transfers, such as a pipeline to supply drinking water to Aleppo from the Euphrates. There are 165 dams in Syria with a total storage capacity of 19.6 km^{3}. By contrast, demand management measures, such as metering, tariff adjustments, more efficient irrigation technologies, and the reduction of non-revenue water in drinking water supply—have received less emphasis than supply-side approaches. The government implements a large program for the construction of wastewater treatment plants including the use of reclaimed water for irrigation.

Water is regulated by the Ministry of Energy.

== Water resources base ==
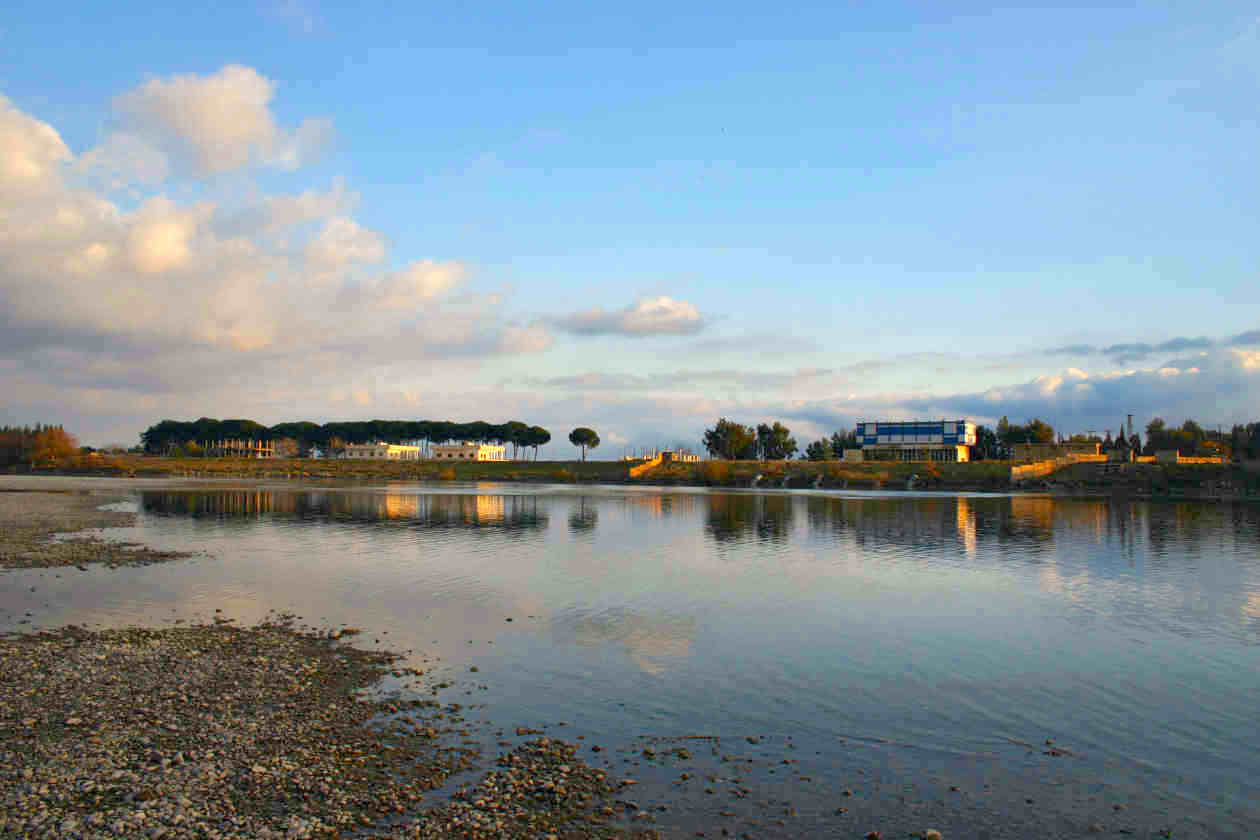
The Euphrates River, shown here near Raqqa, is the most important water source for Syria.

=== Surface water ===
The most important rivers of Syria are the Euphrates, the Tigris, the Orontes and the Yarmouk River. All these rivers are shared between Syria and its neighbors. The Euphrates, by far the most important river in Syria, flows from Turkey through Syria to Iraq. In Syria, it is joined by the Khabur and the Balikh rivers, which both originate in the Syro-Turkish border region. The Tigris River originates in the eastern Taurus Mountains in Turkey and forms the border between Syria and Turkey on a small mountainous stretch of the river. Its mean annual flow is 18 km^{3}/year, but very little can be used by Syria due to its remote location. The Orontes River, which flows from Lebanon through Syria to Turkey, has an average flow of 0.4 km^{3}/year (13 m³/s). The water resources of the Yarmouk River, which is shared with Jordan and Israel and flows into the Jordan River, average some 0.4 km^{3}/year (14 m³/s).

Among Syria's smaller rivers is the Barada River, which flows through Damascus and is one of the few notable rivers that flows entirely inside Syrian territory. The Quweiq River flows from Turkey to Syria and the city of Aleppo. The Nahr al-Kabir al-Shamali (Northern Great River) rises in Turkey and flows through the northern coastal plain and Latakia. The Nahr al-Kabir al-Janoubi (Southern Great River) flows through the southern coastal plain and, on its lower stretch, forms the border between Syria and Lebanon. It has an average flow of 0.3 km^{3}/year (8 m³/s). Both rivers form part of what is called the "coastal basin", which is actually a group of small river basins in Syria that drain to the Mediterranean.

=== International agreements on transboundary rivers ===
While Syria has signed written agreements with its neighbors on transboundary rivers, none of these agreements is an international treaty that would have to be ratified by the Parliaments of the respective countries. The agreements are rather non-binding memorandums of understanding.

Euphrates River. In 1989 Iraq and Syria signed a water-sharing agreement under which a maximum of 42% (210 m³/s) of the surface water inflow through the Euphrates granted by Turkey unilaterally to the downstream riparians (500 m³/s) was considered as Syria's share. There is no final agreement regarding the Syrian water rights on the Euphrates and Tigris rivers. However, since 2005 a group of scholars and retired officials from Syria, Iraq and Turkey initiated Track II diplomacy under the Euphrates-Tigris Initiative for Cooperation. It aims to promote cooperation among the three countries, including through a joint data inventory. In March 2008 the three riparian countries formed a joint "water institute" based in Turkey that will "work toward the solution of water-related problems among the three".

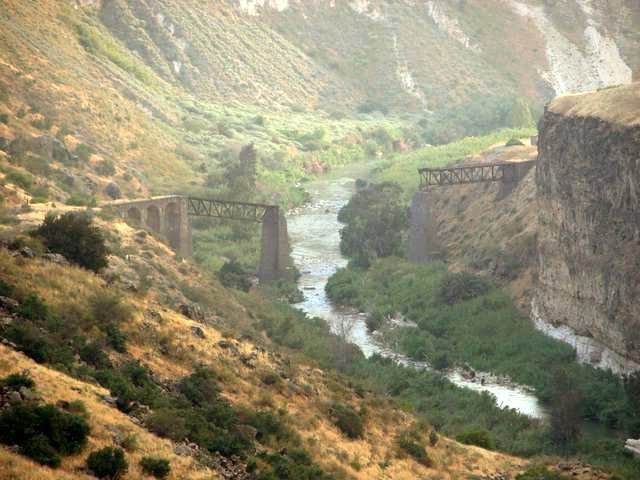
The Yarmouk River forms the border between Jordan and Syria

Orontes River. There is an agreement between Lebanon and Syria over the Orontes signed in 1994, which stipulates that Lebanon receives 80 million cubic meters of water per year "if the river flow inside Lebanon is 400 million cubic meters per year or more". This means that the risk of drought is borne by Lebanon. No new wells were allowed to be drilled in the Lebanese portion of the Orontes basin since the agreement had been signed.

There is apparently no such agreement over the Orontes between Syria and Turkey. However, in March 2008 Syria and Turkey reportedly agreed to jointly build a dam on the river, which suggests that some kind of agreement has been made.

Yarmouk River. In 1987 Syria and Jordan signed an agreement about the sharing of the river's water and have subsequently built a dam, the Unity Dam, on the border between the two countries.

=== Groundwater ===
Historical groundwater recharge has been estimated at 4 km^{3}/year, out of which 2 km^{3}/year was estimated to discharge through springs into rivers (average 1977–2001). After deducting this "overlap" between surface water and groundwater net renewable groundwater resources were estimated at 2 km^{3}/year. Groundwater in Syria is heavily overexploited (see below).

=== Overall estimates ===
Estimates of water resources in Syria vary greatly, which is due to different assumptions about inflows from and outflows to other countries, different methodologies to account for overlaps between surface water and groundwater, and poor data. For example, one report estimates "internal" renewable water resources at 7.1 km^{3}/year (long-term average 1977–2001), taking into account overlaps between data between surface water and groundwater. However, UNDP estimates the renewable surface and groundwater resources at 10 km^{3}/year. FAO estimates "total actual renewable water resources" at 16.8 km^{3}/year. The same report estimates "actual external renewable surface water resources" at 17.3 km^{3}/year, including 15.8 km^{3} of water "entering" with the Euphrates, as unilaterally proposed by Turkey, 0.3 km^{3} of water "entering" with the Asi-Orontes, as agreed with Lebanon, and 1.3 km^{3}/year from the Tigris. No specific estimates are provided for outflows of surface water to neighboring countries. If 58% of the flow of the Euphrates entering Syria (9.16 km^{3}/year) are considered Iraq's share as stipulated in the 1989 agreement, actual water resources available to Syria would be much lower than stated above. Finally, official data are questionable because better hydro-geological investigations of groundwater are needed to obtain more reliable data.

== Water use ==
Total annual water withdrawal was estimated at 19.4 km^{3}/year in 2008–2009, including 2.4 km^{3}/year taken by depleting groundwater and surface water reservoirs. It was estimated at 16.7 km^{3}/year in 2003, 88% of which was for agricultural purposes.

=== Overexploitation of groundwater ===
In some basins, such as that of the Barada around Damascus, total water use exceeds availability of renewable water resources, resulting in overexploitation of groundwater. In the Mleita plain around the town of Al-Nabk in the Kalamoon Mountains north of Damascus, for example, the water table declined from 35 meter in 1984 to below 250 meter in 2009. Agriculture all but disappeared and the fertile valley was turned into a dusty wasteland. Other areas of heavy groundwater overexploitation are the area around Mhardeh in Hama Governorate, Khan Shaykhun in Idlib Governorate and the Damascus Ghouta where groundwater levels dropped by more than 6 meters per year in some areas between 1993 and 2000. Overexploitation of groundwater has contributed to a decline in the flow of the Khabur River which has ceased to flow during summer since 1999. The number of wells in Syria has been estimated to have increased from 135,089 in 1999 to over 213,335 in 2007, according to the National Agricultural Policy Centre (NAPC). The lands irrigated by groundwater increased from 652,000ha in 1985 to 1.4m ha in 2005. Rural electrification, diesel subsidies and subsidized loans for the drilling and equipment of wells contributed to the boom in groundwater irrigation.

== Water pollution ==
According to the Syrian National Environmental Action Plan of 2003, surface and groundwater are contaminated in many areas with domestic and industrial wastewater. For example, in the Barada River concentrations of biological oxygen demand (BOD) and ammonia exceeded Syrian Standards for 86% of collected samples between 1995 and 2000. Well and spring water in the basin is bacteriologically contaminated because of sewage discharge. The concentrations of nitrates in some wells in the Ghouta near Damascus exceeded the limits set by the drinking water standards. Because of discharges by tanneries concentrations of Chromium III reach 10 mg/liter in Al Daiyani River and exceed the allowable limits ten-fold in the wells of Al Zablatini area, all located in the Barada basin.

On the Orontes River analyses of water samples for ammonia, suspended solids and BOD indicated that concentrations exceeded the allowable limits, particularly in the lower part of the river. In the upper part, water quality is acceptable. On the Quweiq River flowing through Aleppo concentrations of BOD, ammonia and heavy metals exceeded allowable limits. In the coastal region wells used for drinking purposes are contaminated with high concentrations of nitrates and ammonia because of sewage discharge and use of fertilizers. Water salinity is also high in some wells because of seawater intrusion into the fresh groundwater aquifers.

== Dams ==
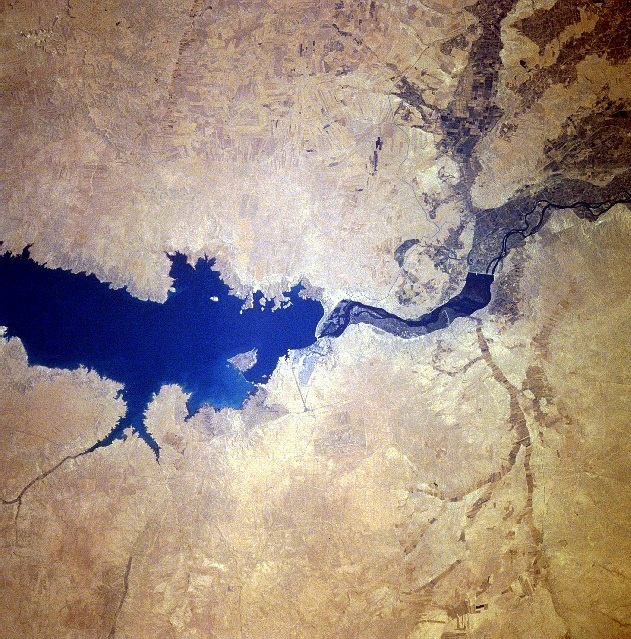
The Tabqa Dam, Syria's largest dam, and Euphrates Lake on the Euphrates from space, June 1996. North is at the top left of the image.

There are 165 dams in Syria with a total storage capacity of 19.6 km^{3}. By far the largest dam is the Tabqa Dam, located near Raqqa on the Euphrates and forming Euphrates Lake. Its purpose is production of hydropower, irrigation and storage of water for drinking water for Aleppo. Medium-size dams include the Al-Rastan (0.2 km^{3}), the Lake Homs Dam (Qattinah) (0.2 km^{3}), the Mahardah (0.07 km^{3}) and the Taldo (0.02 km^{3}). In 2007 there were 49 dams on the Orontes River with a total storage capacity of 1.5 km^{3}, or more than three times the average annual flow of the river. There were 42 dams on the Yarmouk with a total storage capacity of 0.3 km^{3}. Twenty-one dams are located in the coastal area with a total storage capacity of 0.6 km^{3}.

== Legal and institutional framework ==
A comprehensive regulatory framework for integrated water resources management does not exist in Syria. Over 140 laws dealing with water have been passed since 1924. Prohibitions on well drilling and groundwater pollution have been passed, but there are no clear mechanisms for their enforcement. The Syrian water sector is both highly centralized and fragmented between sector institutions that have overlapping functions and responsibilities. A Council of General Commission for Water Resource Management is in charge of integrating water policies between various Ministries. According to another source there is a Higher Water Committee, which is presided by the Deputy Prime Minister for service affairs. According to a report on Syria's water resources, "one of the consequences of the fragmentation and lack of coordination within the water sector is that key water resource data are not exchanged between the different institutions, which in turn hampers effective policy making."

Ministries with responsibilities related to water resources management include:

- The Ministry of Energy (MOE) is a key actor in water resource management. It is responsible for water resources management and for the provision of all irrigation water in the country, including sewage effluent. MOI is also in charge of controlling and monitoring water quality through the Water Safety Committee. Through its 14 water and sanitation directorates (Establishments) it is also in charge of providing water supply and sanitation services.
- The Ministry of Agriculture (MOA) is responsible for the rational use of water for agricultural purposes, for minimizing water consumption and encouraging the use of modern irrigation techniques.
- The Ministry of Local Administration and Environment (MOLAE) is responsible for dealing with all main environmental issues. In addition, it has the task to plan and implement all governmental activities at regional level. MOLAE is responsible for the protection of the environment by issuing the required standards and monitoring the quality of water for all uses.

== Water resources assessment and planning ==
From 2002 to 2004, the Ministry of Irrigation, with the support of Dutch development cooperation, prepared an integrated water resources management plan for the coastal basins. The project included detailed water resources assessment studies, the analysis and selection of strategies and an action plan developed in consultation with various government stakeholders. From 2002 onwards, a Water Resources Information Center in the Ministry of Irrigation has been established with the assistance of JICA. The center established Geographical Information Systems for the Barada-Awaj Basin around Damascus and the coastal basins, including data on groundwater, surface water and water quality.

Syria plans to irrigate 25,000ha in the Northeast by pumping water from the Tigris.

== Water shortages during the Syrian civil war ==
During the Wadi Barada offensive, there were periods of water shortages in Damascus due to rebels' control of Ain al-Fijah in late 2016, until it was controlled by the Syrian army in early 2017.

In 2020, the Turkish authorities started to cut water supplies from the Euphrates, which caused huge water shortages in Al-Hasakah Governorate. Those schemes might have been used to affect the Kurdish-controlled areas in north Syria.

== See also ==
- List of rivers in Syria
- Water resources management in Greater Damascus
- Water supply and sanitation in Syria
