= Rakka Eyalet =

Ottoman province (1586-1864)

Arabic: إيالة الرقة Ottoman Turkish: ایالت رقه Eyalet-i Rakka
- Eyalet of the Ottoman Empire
- 1586–1864
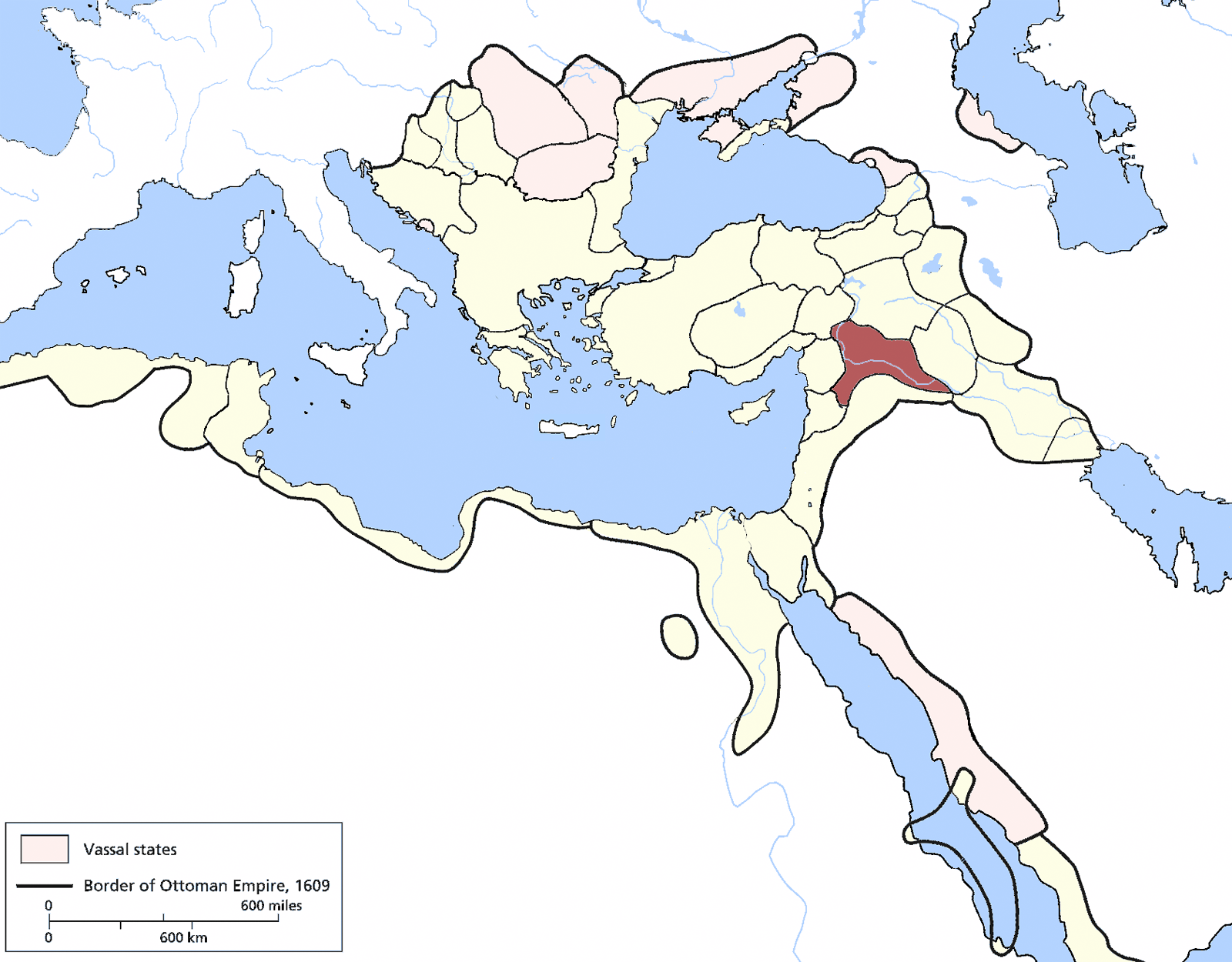
- The Rakka Eyalet in 1609
- Capital: Urfa
- History
  - Established: 1586
  - Disestablished: 1864
Preceded by	Succeeded by
Eyalet of Diyarbekir	Aleppo Vilayet
- Today part of: Syria; Turkey; Iraq

The eyalet of Rakka or Urfa (Arabic: إيالة الرقة; Ottoman Turkish: ایالت رقه, romanized: Eyālet-i Raqqa) was an eyalet of the Ottoman Empire. Its reported area in the 19th century was 24,062 square miles (62,320 km^{2}).

The eyalet was created in 1586 on territory previously under the jurisdiction of Diyarbekir. In the 16th century, the town of Raqqa again entered the historical record as an Ottoman customs post on the Euphrates. However, the capital of this eyalet and seat of the vali was not Raqqa but ar-Ruha about 200 kilometres (120 mi) north of Raqqa.

== Sanjak of Rakka ==
From c. 1535 until the creation of Rakka Eyalet in 1586, Rakka was a sanjak of Diyarbekir Eyalet. The first documentation of this sanjak is in a list of sanjaks under Diyarbekir from sometime between 1548 and 1551. The earliest tax census for the sanjak dates from 1564 and returned a value of 1,339,629 akçes (compared to the Aleppo sanjak's 11,734,193 akçes). The sanjak of Rakka was at this time divided into four nahiyes: one was Rakka proper, called Nefs-i Rakka; the second comprised the Balikh valley north of Rakka (aka 'Ayn 'Arūs); the third was Ja'bar; and the fourth was Kapulı Bük (literally "reed thicket"), which probably consisted of the areas immediately downstream from Raqqa on the Euphrates. The main agricultural products in the sanjak were wheat, "corn" ("demet"), barley, and cotton. Taxes were partly collected in kind on these crops. Most taxes in the sanjak, particularly in the Balikh and Nefs-i Rakka nahiyes, were collected through iltizam tax farming rather than through the timar or zeamet systems.

During this period, the sanjak of Rakka was "fully integrated into the empire's military-administrative structure", with Ottoman officials directly in charge. The three main Ottoman officials were the sanjak-bey, or governor-commander; the kadı, or judge; and the dizdar, or the commander of the citadel in Raqqa. The sanjak-bey was appointed directly by the Sublime Porte and had control over the imperial troops stationed at Raqqa. The kadı, in additional to his judicial role, was responsible for collecting waqf dues from nomadic tribes, report and address abuses by tax farmers, and act as a check on the sanjak-bey's power. The dizdar had "police authority" over Raqqa's citadel and probably also the whole city.

List of sanjak-beys of Rakka sanjak
Name	Years in office	Notes
Şeyhi Beğ (1)	1548-?	
Sami Beğ	sometime before 1554	
Ferruh Beğ	?-1554	
Melik Halil-oğlı Mehmed Beğ	1554-1556	
Murad Beğ	1556	
Şeyhi Beğ (2)	1556-1560	
Hacci Beğ-oğlı Ahmed Beğ	1560-1564	
Nimetullah Beğ	1565-1575	Not to be confused with a different Nimetullah Beğ who was governor of Salamiya; he was accused of stealing 500 camels in 1574 and then attacking the çavuş sent to investigate; he was then removed from office and imprisoned at Diyarbekir.
Hacci Beğ	1575-6 (983 AH)	Never actually arrived
Nimetullah Beğ	1576-?	Reinstated as sanjak-bey after complaints from locals that bedouin sheep rustlers in the district.

In the late 1500s, the Ottomans prioritized "establishing control over its Mesopotamian periphery"; they saw the region as needing a "reconquest". Beginning around 1565, they increasingly directed the sanjak-beys of Rakka to subjugate local tribes and collect overdue taxes from them. Ottoman authorities settled soldiers and members of Ottoman-allied tribes in the sanjak of Rakka, which sometimes led to conflicts with nomadic pastoralist tribes who already lived there. For example, in 1572, the kadı of Raqqa and the local head of the Banu Rabi'a Arab tribe sent a joint petition to Istanbul requesting that the lands around Qal'at Ja'bar, which had been "ruined and abandoned since Timur's time", be converted into at least 100 sipahi-level fiefs, to be granted to people who could redevelop the land for agriculture again.

== Eyalet of Rakka ==
In the late 1500s, the Ottoman administrative system was shifting away from military-command-based sanjaks as the basic territorial unity of the empire and replacing them with taxation-based eyalets. This trend, as well as an "increasing awareness of the Middle Euphrates's productive capacity", a need for the Ottomans to secure the frontier, and the temporary importance of the region due to the war with the Safavids from 1578 to 1590, all factored into the creation of the Eyalet of Rakka in 1586. The new eyalet may have originally been intended to encompass the entire Middle Euphrates region as far south as Anah, along with the entire Khabur valley, but if this was the case then these territories were "soon detached again". Birecik would have been detached as well, but it was re-attached to Rakka Eyalet in 1588.

The Celali rebellions and the costly Ottoman–Habsburg wars caused Ottoman central authority to decline in Rakka Eyalet in the early 1600s. From about 1606 until 1618, the beylerbey of Raqqa was given to the Kurdish emir of Cizre, Şeref Paşa, rather than an Ottoman official. At other times, the position was "nothing more than a sinecure for prominent military commanders or their sons". Governance in the eyalet was mostly in the hands of powerful ümera families based at Urfa.

In the late 1600s, though, Rakka Eyalet returned to prominence as a center of the empire's Iskan project of tribal sedentarization. The citadel in Raqqa was renovated in 1683, and then the iskan program began in earnest under Kadızade Hüseyin Paşa, who was the eyalet's governor from 1590 to 1595. Hüseyin was tasked with settling Turkmen and Kurdish tribes from Anatolia in the eyalet, particularly in the Balikh valley upstream from Raqqa. An important feature of the eyalet's governance during this period is that its governor was often authorized to cross into other provinces to subjugate tribes. The heavily Kurdish district of Kilis was especially important for this, and the governors of Rakka were often given the iltizam tax farms over Kilis.

== Administrative divisions ==
Sanjaks of Rakka Eyalet in the 17th century:

1. Sanjak of Jemasa
2. Sanjak of Kharpud (Harput)
3. Sanjak of Deir Rahba
4. Sanjak of Beni Rebia
5. Sanjak of Saruj
6. Sanjak of Harran
7. Sanjak of Rika (Raqqa)
8. Sanjak of Ana ve Hit (Anah & Hit in Al-Anbar)
9. Sanjak of Roha or Urfa, the seat of the Pasha

Sanjaks between 1700 and 1740:

1. Sanjak of the Pasha (Raqqa-Ruha)
2. Sanjak of Birecik
3. Sanjak of Deyr-i Rahba
4. Sanjak of Beni Rabi'a

== See also ==
- Raqqa Governorate
