= Tell Feyda =

Tell Feyda on the right bank of the Khabur River is an archaeological site in northern Syria. The material remains date to the pre-pottery neolithic and the site was excavated in 1990.
