= Yarmouk (Syria) =

Yarmouk اليرموك
- Village
- Interactive map of Yarmouk
- Governorate: Al-Hasakah
- District: Al-Qamishli District
- Subdistrict: Yarmouk Subdistrict

Yarmouk (Jaz'ah) is a Syrian town in the Qamishli District of Al-Hasakah Governorate in northeastern Syria. It is the administrative center of the Yarmouk subdistrict, established in 2008. The town is located approximately 57 km southeast of Qamishli and about 13 km from the Syrian-Iraqi border. The 'Uwayridh Valley, a tributary of the Wadi Rad and a branch of the Jaghjagh River (which later flows into the Khabur River), runs through it. The town is a small rural community whose economy relies on agriculture, particularly barley cultivation, as well as sheep and Arabian horse breeding.
