= Arous =

Arous may refer to:

== People ==
- Abdessalem Arous (born 1979), Tunisian judoka
- Adem Arous (born 2004), tunisian footballer
- Gérard Ben Arous (born 1957), French mathematician
- Islam Arous (born 1996), Algerian footballer
- Eddy Ben Arous (born 1990), French rugby union player of Nigerian origin

== Places ==
- Arous, one of the Seven Heavens according to Shi'ite sources
- Arous Village, a once-abandoned holiday resort on the Sudanese Red Sea coast featured in the film The Red Sea Diving Resort
- Ain al-Arous, a Syrian village
- Ben Arous, a city in Tunisia

== In fiction ==
- Arous, the name of a planet in the 1957 film The Brain from Planet Arous
- Arous, the name of a planet in the 1986 film Prison Ship
