= Jemasa =

Jemasa, Jammasa or Al Jammasa (الجمّاسة; Turkish: Cammasa; Kurdish: Gammasa) a Euphrates Arab tribal Federation that was centered around the Lower Khabur region. The 17th century Cammasa/Jemasa district in Eyalet of Raqqa was named after the tribe then dominant at that region.

== Kurdish Chiefdom ==
In the 16th century the Emirate of Cammasa was under the rule of a Kurdish prince, until 1628 when it was transferred to direct Ottoman rule from Urfa then the new capital of the new Eyalet of Raqqa

== See also ==
- Diyar Mudar
- Kurdish chiefdoms
