= Daisan =

Daisan may refer to:

- Daišan, Manchu prince
- Daisan River, a river of Turkey
