= Nuzi ware =

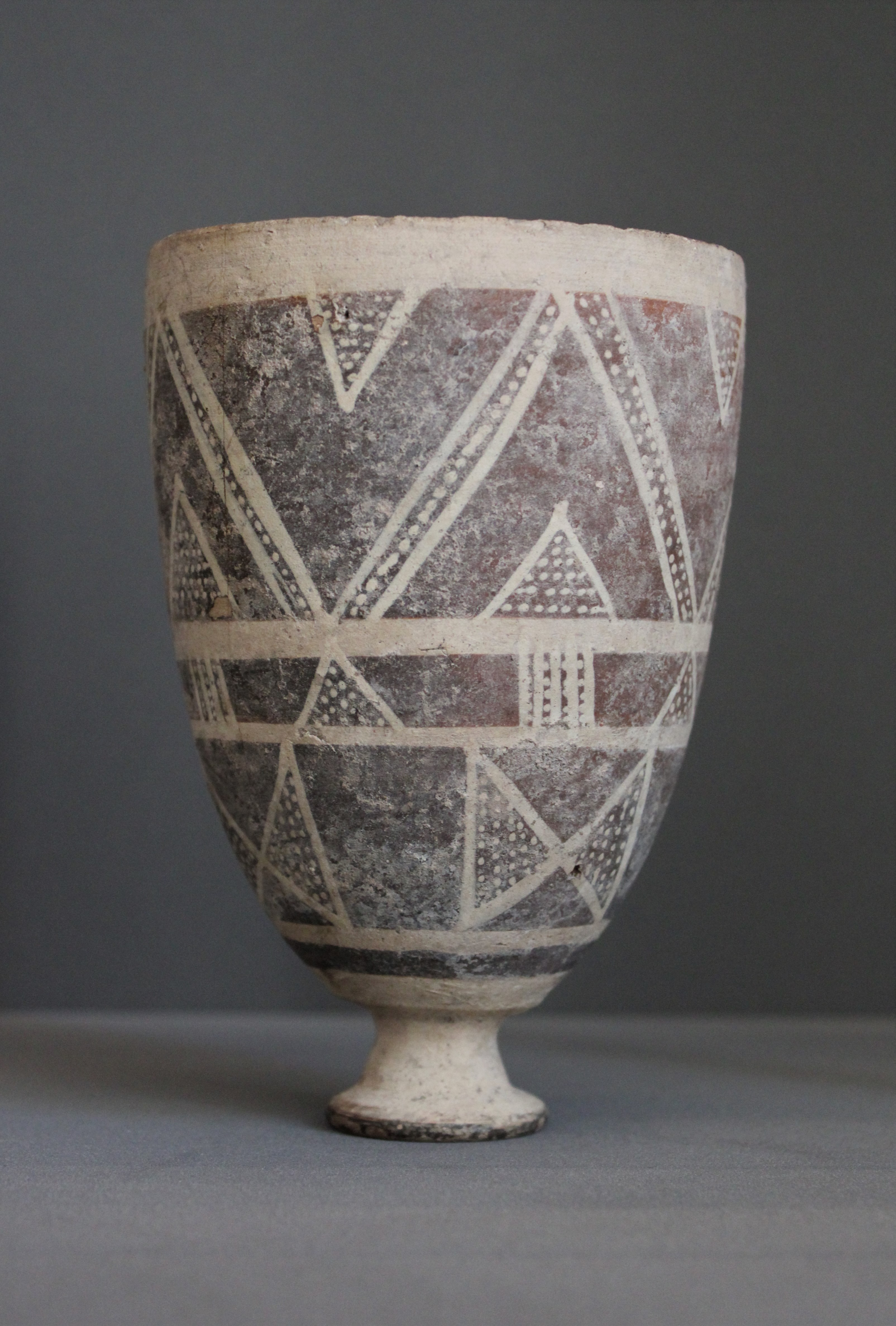
Painted Nuzi ware goblet from Tell Jigan (Iraq)

Nuzi ware is the type of a ceramic ware which is especially associated with the Mitanni empire (15th to early 13th century BC). It was first identified at Nuzi, modern Iraq. This is a painted prestige pottery that is mostly found in a socially elevated context.

== Distribution ==
Nuzi ware is typically found from the Orontes River valley in the west, to as far as Babylon in the east. In the south, specimens were also found in Qatna, a city that lies outside the sphere of influence of the Mitanni empire, which indicates that the Nuzi ceramics was also used as trade goods.

Bronze Age pottery in the Middle East is mostly undecorated. The elegantly decorated Nuzi ware, with its delicate vessel shapes thus quickly aroused particular interest among researchers.

== Development ==
Much older Khabur ware, which is mostly undecorated, or has simple geometrical decorations, precedes Nuzi ware in this general area, and it influenced Nuzi to some extent. The fourth and last phase of Khabur ware (around 1500 BC) is generally contemporaneous with Nuzi ware.

Nuzi ware retains some shapes of Khabur ware, also the distinctive bird decorations of Nuzi have some precedence in the Khabur ware. At Tell Brak, Khabur ware occurs in parallel with white-on-dark painted Nuzi ware, which continues after the disappearance of Khabur ware at this site.

== Description ==
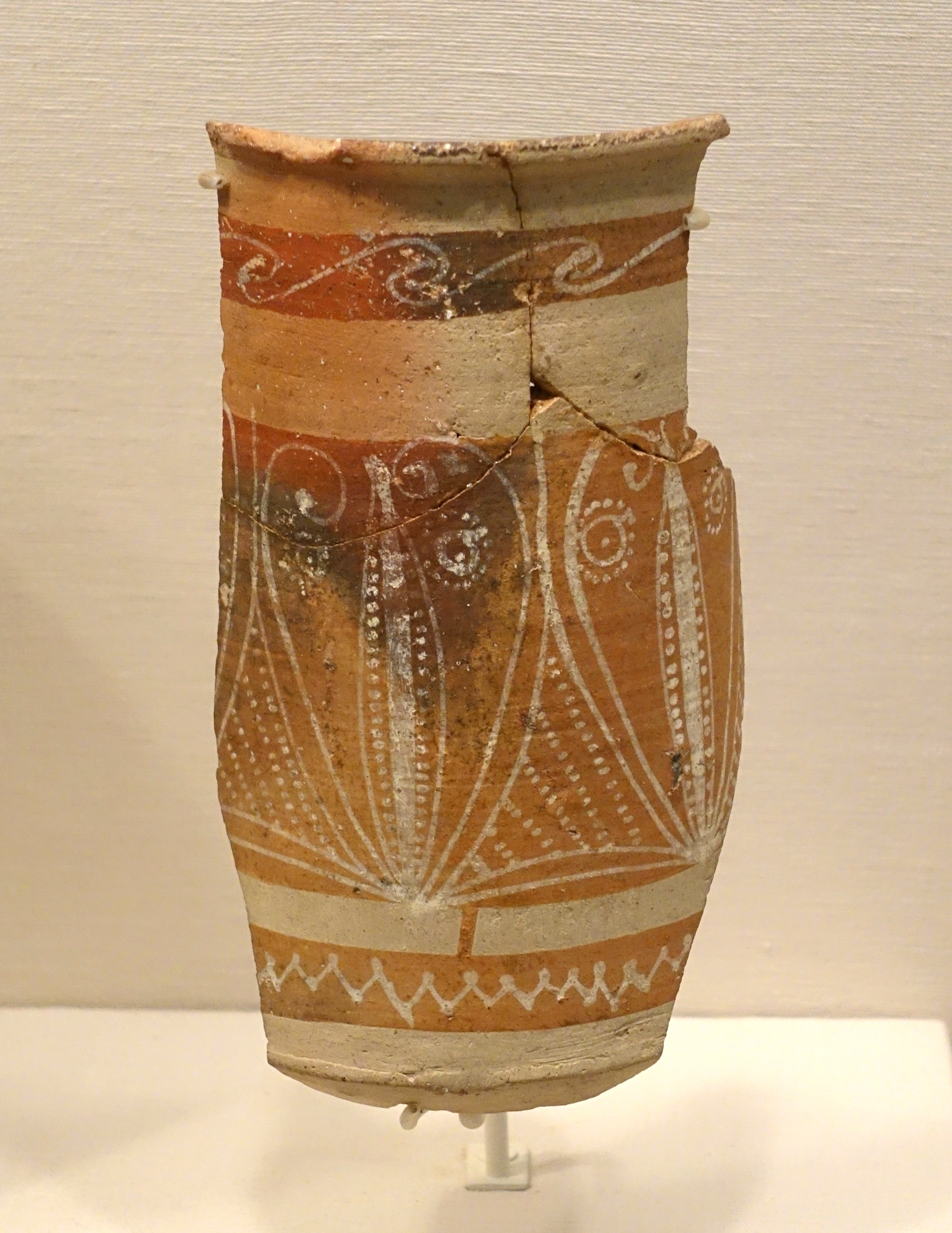
Painted Nuzi ware goblet from Tell Tayinat, 1600-1200 BC - Oriental Institute Museum, University of Chicago

White, painted patterns on a dark background are typical. The background can be dark brown to black. Various ceramic shapes are attested, but tall, slender vessels and goblets are particularly popular. These vessel shapes have a long tradition in Syria and Mesopotamia, so this seems to indicate that Nuzi ware represents a local development in northern Mesopotamia. The surface decorations can also be traced back to Mesopotamian models.

Especially in Alalakh (modern Tell Atchana) numerous examples of this ceramic came to light, which are decorated with floral motifs. At Nuzi, itself, on the other hand, more geometric patterns are attested. Nevertheless, floral patterns are also documented in the east of the Mitanni area, although not to the same degree. The floral motifs were perhaps influenced by Minoan ceramics.

The name Nuzi ware was suggested by Max Mallowan in 1948. Before that, this ceramic style was known as Hurrian ceramics. In order not to identify the ceramics with any one ethnic group, a more neutral term is now preferred.

== Origins ==
According to a 2016 review by Duraid S. Polis, the origin of Nuzi ware was in upper Mesopotamia, and this pottery belongs to the ceramic assemblage of Khabur ware Period 4, as proposed by H. Oguchi. Similar conclusions were also reached by Paul Zimansky (1995), based on his examination at the Tell Hamida site.

Also according to D. Polis, the end of Nuzi ware can be identified by the destruction of the second layer of Nuzi, which also marked the end of the Mitannian kingdom in the fourteenth century B.C.

== See also ==
- Hurrians

== Bibliography ==
- Diana L. Stein: Khabur Ware and Nuzi Ware: Their Origin, Relationship, and Significance. Malibu 1984
- Abdullah Bakr Othman (2018), The Distribution of the Nuzi ware in Northern Iraq and Syria. Polytechnic Journal: Vol.8 No. 2 (May 2018): Pp: 347-371
- Oselini, Valentina, (2020). "Defining the MB-LB transition in northern Mesopotamia: some archaeological considerations on the new data from the Erbil Plain and neighbouring regions", in Costanza Coppini, Francesca Simi (eds.), Interactions and New Directions in Near Eastern Archaeology, Volume 3, Proceedings of the 5th Broadening Horizons Conference (Udine 5–8 June 2017), EUT Edizioni Università di Trieste, Trieste.
- Pfalzner, Peter, (2007). "The Late Bronze Age Ceramic Traditions of the Syrian Jazirah", in al-Maqdissī, Mīšīl; Matoïan, Valérie; Nicolle, Christophe (eds.), Céramique de l'âge du bronze en Syrie, 2, L'Euphrate et la région de Jézireh, Bibliothèque archéologique et historique 180, Beyrouth.
- De Martino, Stefano, (2018). "Political and Cultural Relations between the Kingdom of Mittani and its Subordinated Polities in Syria and Southeast Anatolia", in Changing Faces of Kingship in Syria-Palestine 1500-500 BC, Alter Orient und Testament 459, Ugarit Verlag
- Studies on the Civilization and Culture of Nuzi and the Hurrians (SCCNH), multiple publications 1981–2009. Cornell University Library / Department of Near Eastern Studies - cornell.edu
