= Chabora =

Chabora (Ancient Greek: Χαβώρα) was an ancient town on the Euphrates, near Nicephorion, that probably derives its name from the Chaboras river. Theophylact Simocatta mentions Ἀβορέων φρούριον, which is, according to William Smith, the same place.
