= Water supply and sanitation in Syria =

Data
- Water coverage (broad definition): Rural 80% (2006) urban 94% (2006)
- Sanitation coverage (broad definition): Rural 74% (2002) urban 98% (2002)
- Share of tax-financing: High
- Share of external financing: Low

Institutions
- National water and sanitation company: None
- Water and sanitation regulator: Ministry of Water Resources
- Responsibility for policy setting: Ministry of Water Resources
- Sector law: Law No. 55

Syria is a semi-arid country with scarce water resources. The largest water-consuming sector in Syria is agriculture. Domestic water use is only about 9% of total water use.

A big challenge for Syria is its high population growth, with a rapidly increasing demand for urban and industrial water. In 2006, the population of Syria was 19.4 million with a growth rate of 2.7%.

== Access ==
Public water supply systems cover about 95% of the households in urban areas and about 80% in rural areas.

Drinking Water Supply
Year	Urban	Rural
1996	95%	71%
2002	98%	83%
2006	94%	80%

In 2002 96% of all urban households were connected to a sewer system. Nearly half (46%) of rural house connections were connected to a pipe sewerage system in 2002. In 2002 about 30% of the rural households were connected to a pit latrine.

Improved Sanitation
Year	Urban	Rural
1996	97%	56%
2002	98%	75%

== Water quality ==
All major cities - with the exception of Aleppo – and all rural distribution networks in the rural areas are supplied with water from springs and groundwater. Major water treatment facilities exist only for the domestic water supply system for Aleppo, which is provided with water from Euphrates Lake.

== Water resources ==
Most of the domestic water in Syria is supplied by groundwater, wells and springs. One exception is Aleppo city, which receives water for domestic use by pipelines from the Euphrates reservoir. However, the city of Homs is supplied with surface water from the Orontes River through a pipeline from Lake Homs.

== Wastewater management ==
In 2002, total wastewater produced in Syria was estimated at 1,364 million m^{3}. Of this total 550 million m^{3} (40%) was treated in the cities of Damascus, Aleppo, Homs and Salamiyah. All treated wastewater is reused for irrigation. In October 2009, the Ministry of Public Works and Housing announced a plan to develop Syria’s wastewater infrastructure. The plan involves the construction of 180 new wastewater treatment plants across the country. Two plants are in the foreground: one located in Jaramanah and the other serving the southern city of As Suwayda. The procurement of the two plants has been assigned to Syrian-Qatari Holding Company (SQHC). SQH had planned to seek potential strategic partners through competitive tenders before February 2010. To increase the attractiveness of the project the Syrian Ministry of Finance has pledged to provide a sovereign guarantee for the agreements that will be signed with the partners. The two new plants would allow reusing treated effluent for agricultural irrigation, an established practice in Syria. However, as of December 2010 the projects were delayed after SQH failed to reach a financial agreement with the government. Also, a law on public-private partnerships that would have been the legal basis for the Build-Operate Transfer (BOT) projects was delayed.

== Institutional framework ==
The Syrian water sector is fragmented and different institutions have overlapping functions and responsibilities.

The Ministry of Energy (MoE) is responsible for proposing, planning and executing the Government's programme in the field of water supply and sanitation. Through its 14 water and sanitation directorates (Establishments) it is also in charge of providing water supply and sanitation services.

The Ministry of Local Administration and Environment (MoLAE) has the task to plan and implement all governmental activities at regional level. MLAE is responsible for the protection of the environment by issuing the required standards and monitoring the quality of water for all uses.

The Ministry of Agriculture (MoA) is responsible for supplying water for agriculture.

== Foreign intervention ==
Turkish airstrikes in northeastern Syria between October 2019 and January 2024 have left over one million people without access to water, exacerbating an already dire humanitarian crisis. The attacks, which targeted oil fields, gas facilities, and power stations, have severely damaged the region’s infrastructure, including the Alouk water station. This disruption has cut off water supplies to people in the Al-Hasakah Governorate, which had relied on the station for its water. Turkey claimed it targeted Kurdish militant groups, such as the PKK and YPG. However, critics argue that the strikes on civilian infrastructure, including electricity and water facilities, could constitute violations of international law, potentially amounting to war crimes.

== See also ==
- Water management in Greater Damascus
- Water resources management in Syria
