= Water management in Greater Damascus =

Water management in Greater Damascus, a metropolitan area with more than 4 million inhabitants, is characterized by numerous challenges, including groundwater overexploitation, increasing water demand, intermittent supply, and pollution. These challenges could be exacerbated by the impact of climate change, since projections indicate that a decrease in rainfall is likely. The quality of residential water supply mirrors social divisions within the metropolitan area, with the poorest neighborhoods receiving the worst service. Irrigation in the rural parts of Greater Damascus, in particular in the Ghouta, still accounts for about 70% of water use in the metropolitan area, with the remainder being used for residential, commercial and industrial use.

The government has responded to the above challenges by banning the drilling of new agricultural wells, promoting water-saving irrigation techniques, rehabilitating the distribution network to reduce leakage, investing heavily in wastewater treatment for reuse, and experimenting with groundwater recharge. However, none of these measures has been successfully completed so far. Reallocation of water from irrigation to urban uses has also been suggested, but it has never been seriously considered by the government for political reasons, including strong traditional links of the ruling Baath Party to the Peasant's Union. Instead of forcefully promoting local solutions, the government continues to contemplate the large-scale transfer of water from Euphrates Lake on the Euphrates River through a costly mega-project.

Decision-making concerning water remains highly centralized. Ultimately the President of Syria takes all key decisions. Below him responsibility for the water sector is fragmented between different Ministries. One of them is the Ministry of Housing and Construction, which supervises the Damascus Water Supply and Sewerage Authority, the public utility for Greater Damascus. The Ministry of Irrigation also plays an important role in the sector.

== Water resources ==
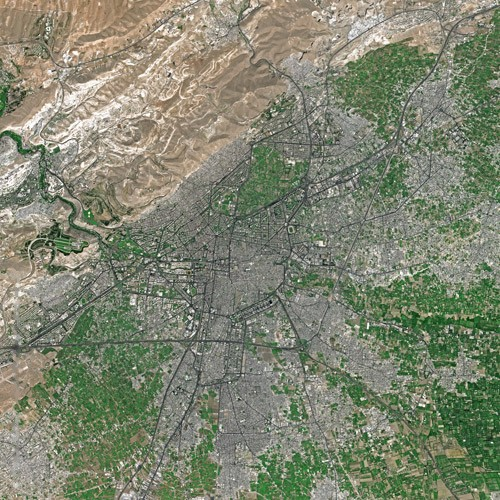
A satellite view of Damascus

Greater Damascus is located within the Barada basin, a closed basin that covers 8,630 km^{2}, and the neighboring Awaj basin. The Barada basin stretches over a distance of 81 km from the Anti-Lebanon mountains in the Northeast of Damascus at an altitude of more than 2,000 m with precipitation of up to 1,800 mm per year to the Ghouta oasis to the West of Damascus at an altitude of 600 m with less than 100 mm of rainfall. The smaller 70 km-long Awaj river runs South of the Barada river. Total primary water resources in the two basins, surface and groundwater, have been estimated at 452 million cubic per year. These water resources are augmented by reused wastewater and return flows from irrigation, estimated at between 500 and more than 800 million cubic metres per year, adding up to a total of 900 and almost 1300 million cubic metres per year. Precipitation is highly seasonal and occurs primarily during winter.

The main sources of water supply for Damascus are the Fijeh and Barada springs. The Fijeh springs are a group of three large karstic springs - The Fijeh main spring, the Fijeh side spring and the Harouch spring - in the Barada gorge. The three springs used to contribute half the flow of the Barada River. The Barada spring is located North of the Fijeh springs close to the Lebanese border. The entire flow of all these springs is captured today, including through wells positioned around the springs. This is why it appears during the summer that the Barada spring has dried up, while its flow is actually being captured and transferred along the river to supply various towns in the Barada gorge as well as Damascus itself with drinking water. Water from the Barada and Fijeh springs is transferred to a mixing station near Dummar where it is being chlorinated and distributed to the city. The city’s water supply is complemented by well fields in the plains around the city. The flow of the springs is highly seasonal, lagging several months behind the precipitation because of snow melt and the karstic characteristics of the rocks from which they emerge. The flow of the Figeh springs is less than 4 m3/second during the low-flow period from July to December. However, it reaches a maximum of more than 12m3/second (average 1962-1991) in April.

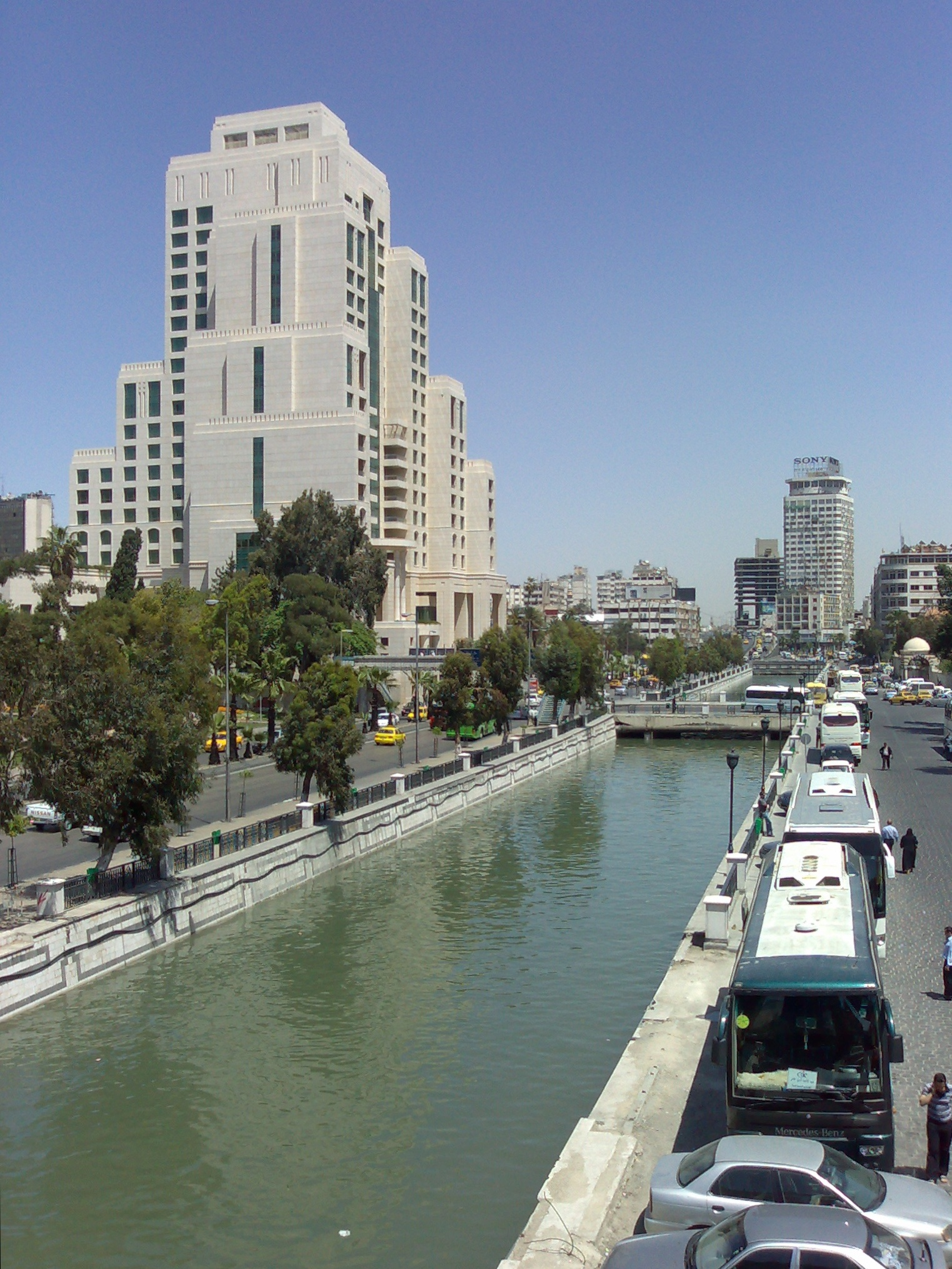
One of the rare periods the Barada river is high, seen here next to the Four Seasons hotel in downtown Damascus

The remaining winter flow of the Barada river is not used for drinking water supply in Damascus. However, it plays an important recreational role for the numerous restaurants along its upper course. It also aliments the Ghouta oasis. When it leaves the Barada gorge and enters the plain of Damascus the Barada river splits into five branches. The two Northern branches flow along the foot of the Qasium mountain towards the East. The central branches, including the Barada proper, flow through the city center alongside the old city into the heart of the Ghouta. The southernmost branch takes a turn to the West before entering the city, and flows into what is called the Western Ghouta. Historically, much of the summer base flow of these rivers derived from the Fijeh and Barada springs. However, since the springs have been captured the river carries fresh water only during the winter and spring. Downstream of Damascus, it also carries more or less diluted wastewater that is being indirectly reused for irrigation in the Ghouta. Some winter flows also end up in the intermittent Lake Al-Utaybah, the lowest point of the closed Barada basin where the water infiltrates or evaporates.

Greater Damascus had about 4.2 million inhabitants in 2007 or about 25% of the population of Syria. This includes 1.7 million in Damascus governorate itself and 2.5 million in the surrounding governorate of Damascus Rif. Most of the population of Greater Damascus lives within the Barada and Awaj basins.

== Water use ==
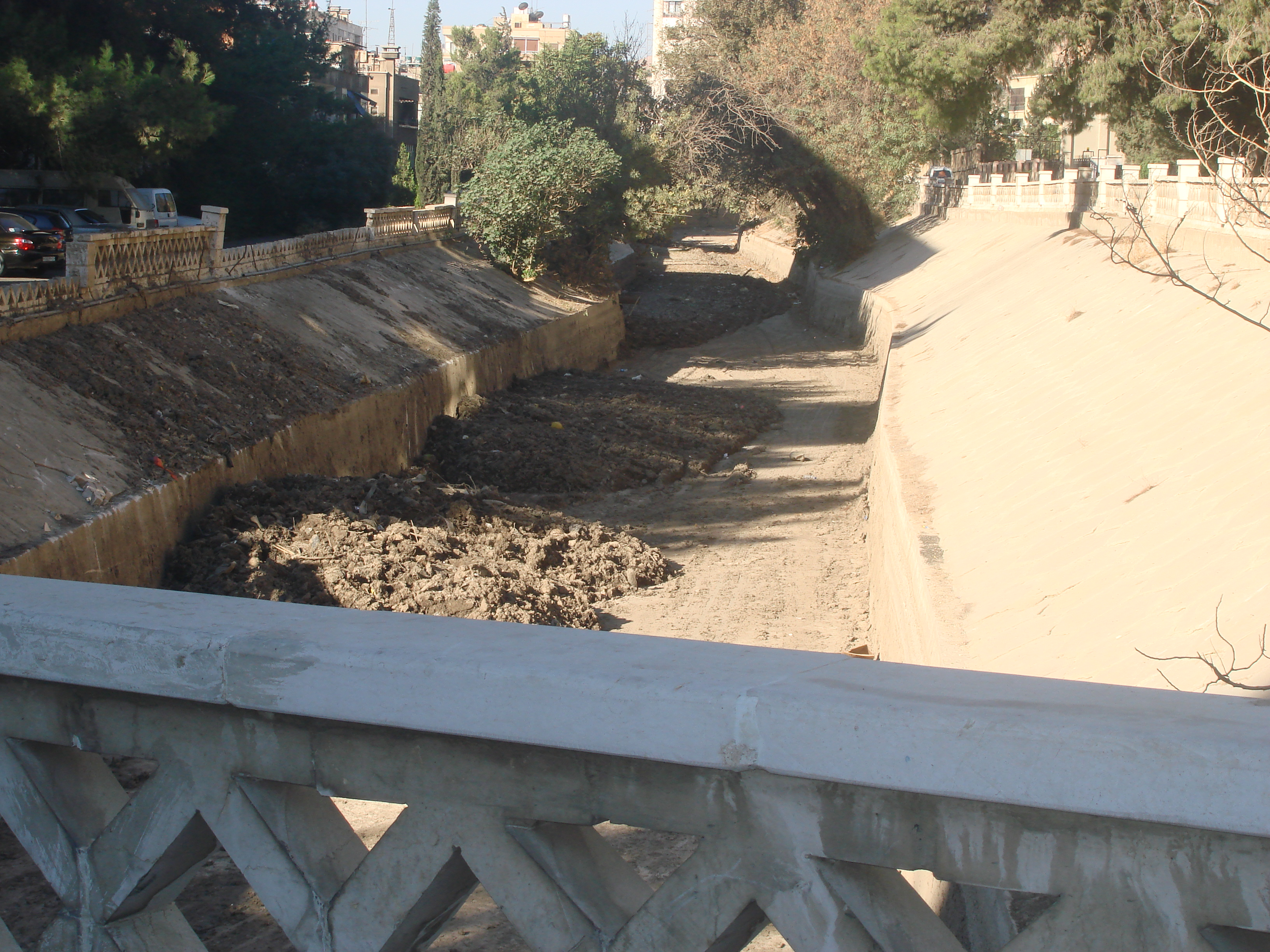
Barada river at the end of the dry season

Just like data on water availability, publicly available data on water use in Greater Damascus are contradictory and outdated. In 2001 water use has been estimated at between 1,350 and 1,700 million cubic metres per year. This includes water use for irrigation that was estimated at between 920 and more than 1,200 million cubic metres per year, accounting for 68% and 76% of total water use in the basin. Domestic water use was estimated at between 300 and 390 million cubic metres per year. The lower bound of this estimate is probably more realistic and is equivalent to an average of about 220 liter/capita/day before distribution losses for a population connected to the network of about 3.75 million. Taking into account non-revenue water of about 50%, this corresponds to about 110 liter/capita/day which is about as much as domestic water use in Germany. However, during summer water availability and thus water use drop significantly. For example, in the summer of 2001 the city received 317,000 cubic meter per day, corresponding to about 85 liter/capita/day before losses and 43 liter/capita/day after losses.

In 1998 the irrigated area in the two basins was estimated at 62,000 hectares. Since then, it is likely to have declined because of the loss of agricultural land to urbanization at the rate of about 1,000 hectares per year.

== Responsibility for water management and water policy ==
Decision-making in Syria is highly centralized and water management is no exception to that rule. Local government has little to no say in water management. Within the government responsibility for water is shared between the Ministry of Housing and Construction, which is in charge of water supply and sanitation, and the Ministry of Irrigation. The Ministry of Local Administration and Environment is in charge of environmental protection, but remains relatively weak. The Ministry of Agriculture and Agrarian Reform also plays a role. Ultimately all important decisions rest with the President of the Republic and the Prime Minister. Decision-making is highly politicized within the framework of general policies established by the Ba'ath Party.

According to a 2009 article by US political scientist Jessica Barnes, while water scarcity in Syria is usually presented as a result of population growth, it actually is a consequence of the ruling Ba'ath party’s promotion of water-intensive agriculture. This support for the agricultural sector is motivated in part by a desire for food self-sufficiency and growth through an expansion in irrigated agriculture. It is also linked to the rural roots of the Ba'ath party and the influential Peasants Union. Although much of the ruling class in Syria is now urban, the symbolic links between the party and the rural sector continue. This political context may explain why the government is reluctant to take drastic steps to reduce the pumping of groundwater from private wells for irrigation in the Ghouta near Damascus.

The utility in charge of water supply and sanitation in Damascus is the Damascus Water Supply and Sewerage Authority, which is under the authority of the Minister of Housing and Construction. The utility’s service area includes the governorate of Damascus and parts of the surrounding Damascus Rif (Rural Damascus) governorate. In April 2009 the Syrian Government merged the two public water utilities operating in the Greater Damascus area, the Damascus Water and Sanitation Establishment (DWSSA) that operated in the Damascus governorate and the Rural Damascus Water Establishment (R-DWSSA) that operated in the Rural Damascus Governorate, into a single utility also bearing the name DWSSA. The decision was prompted by the need to better coordinate operations in the physically integrated service area of Greater Damascus, and to speed up the implementation of projects in rural Damascus governorate that had suffered from the limited execution capacity of R-DWSSA.

In 2002 a Water Resources Information Center has been established in the Ministry of Irrigation with the assistance of JICA. It established a Geographical Information System for the Barada Awaj Basin, including data on groundwater, surface water and water quality.

== Challenges ==
The foremost water challenge in Greater Damascus is an increasing demand-supply imbalance, coupled with groundwater overexploitation and pollution. This imbalance leads to intermittent supply and coping costs in the form of expensive sales of water by tankers. Climate change may exacerbate this imbalance. Poor neighborhoods suffer disproportionately from the area’s water problems.

=== Groundwater overexploitation ===
Between 1985 and 2005 the level of groundwater in the Barada basin, on which Damascus sits, declined from 50 meters to 200 meters. Intensive groundwater use began in the 1960s. Prior to that the groundwater level in the ghouta was 1-3m below the surface in winter and 2-10m in summer. The main source of water for irrigation at the time were the various branches of the Barada River. Landlords ensured that irrigation canals were maintained, and surface water was distributed through an intricate system called whereby farmers took turns (Qirat) whose length varied depending on factors such as the size of their plots and distance from the canals. After a land reform in 1958 newly created cooperatives were unable to maintain the irrigation canals and to implement the distribution system. Furthermore, surface water was increasingly polluted. As a result, farmers drilled wells - usually without a permit - and thus began the overexploitation of groundwater that persists until today.

=== Increasing demand ===
Municipal water demand in Greater Damascus is increasing due to population growth of 2.6% per year (1990–2000) and also to higher living standards leading to higher water demand.

=== Intermittent supply and supply by water tankers ===
The Northern and Western parts of the city, which are closer to the Fijeh springs, receive better service than the Southern and Eastern parts that are at the end of the distribution network. Service is also better in winter when the yield of the spring is highest. During winter residents in the Northwestern parts of Damascus typically receive a continuous flow of water, while residents in the Southeastern parts of the city receive water for only a few hours per day or even every couple of days during summer. For example, the town of Sahenya, 16 km south-west of Damascus, was for 10 days without water in 2006. Most houses in Damascus have rooftop tanks to store water during periods of supply. Many houses have dual plumbing systems, with one tap for water that comes directly from the network and another tap for water that comes from the rooftop tank. As a consequence, many residents do not perceive a water crisis during most of the year, because they have sufficient water either from the network or from their rooftop tanks.

Residents that do not receive enough water in summer are forced to buy water from water tankers. This water is very expensive compared to subsidized tap water. The quality of the tanker water is dubious, since it is drawn from wells that tap aquifers that may be polluted. Furthermore, there is a risk of contamination in the water tankers and in roof tanks.

=== Pollution ===
Surface and groundwater in the Barada basin is polluted by industrial and domestic wastewater, as well as by agricultural non-point sources such as fertilizers and pesticides. Much of the wastewater generated from industrial activities in Greater Damascus is discharged into the environment, mainly to the Barada River, without prior treatment. The uncontrolled disposal of toxic, chemical products, primarily from lead industries and battery manufactories, has also resulted in severe soil pollution. There is no pre-treatment of industrial wastewater discharged into the sewer network. As a result, the largest wastewater treatment plant of Damascus in Adra frequently malfunctions. Measured concentrations of biological oxygen demand (BOD), a measure of organic water pollution, exceeded the allowed limits in most of the branches of the Barada River. According to the Syrian National Environmental Action Plan of 2003, concentrations of BOD and ammonia in the Barada River exceeded Syrian Standards for 86% of collected samples between 1995 and 2000. Well and spring water in the basin is bacteriologically contaminated because of sewage discharge. The concentrations of nitrates in some wells in the Ghouta exceeded the limits set by the drinking water standards. Because of discharges by tanneries concentrations of Chromium III reach 10 mg/liter in Al Daiyani River and exceed the allowable limits tenfold in the wells of Al Zablatini area, all located in the Barada basin. Surface water pollution reduces real estate values next to the river and its branches, as well as the recreational value of the river. It also damages fishery, aquaculture and biodiversity, in addition to its health impacts.

=== Possible impacts of climate change ===
In the period 1960-2010 average precipitation in the Upper Barada basin has remained the same. While the yield of the Fijeh springs has declined from an annual average of 9.5m3/second in 1967-71 to 5.5 m3/second in 1996-2000, this is due to pumping from the aquifer in the immediate vicinity of the springs that was begun in 1981 in order to supply more water to Damascus during the dry season. Climate models project a reduction of rainfall and an increase of temperatures for the Eastern Mediterranean. Hydrological and meteorological data are considered a state secret in Syria, so that data are only indirectly available. According to a study by the Karlsruhe Institute of Technology conducted in 2010 and financed by German development cooperation funds, the yield of the Fijeh springs during the critical low-flow period from July to December is projected to decline by about 5% in the period 2021-2050 compared to the historical average during 1962-1991. However, the model projects a stronger decline of 15% for the distant future (2069-2098) compared to the base period, and even stronger declines of up to 50% during the springs' high-flow period in March–May.

=== Social divisions ===
The poorest section of the population of Damascus live in the Southern neighborhoods which also receive the poorest service quality both in terms of quantity and quality. These neighborhoods are served primarily by wells whose quality is dubious, especially in terms of nitrates (see pollution). Due to overexploitation the amount of water available is insufficient for continuous supply, especially during summer when demand increases and groundwater levels drop (see intermittent supply). Due to pressure changes when supply is turned on and off, pollutants are sucked into leaky distribution pipes which further contaminates drinking water. This phenomenon is more widespread in the poorer neighborhoods.

=== Civil war ===
As a result of the rebel capture of the village of Ain al-Fijah in the Barada River valley and its water spring in February 2012, the flow of water to Damascus and nearby towns has been sporadically cut off by the rebels in retaliation for military operations by government forces in the region for almost 5 years. The conflict escalated on 23 December 2016 when the rebels reportedly polluted the water spring with diesel fuel, although the opposition denies this and claims that the spring was damaged from barrel bombs. As a result, running water was cut off to more than 5.5 million people around Damascus and the government forces launched an offensive on rebel-held villages in the Barada River Valley.

== Responses to challenges ==
The government has responded to the challenges in various ways, including through a ban on drilling new wells, the introduction of more efficient irrigation techniques, the reduction of water losses, an ambitious municipal wastewater treatment program, and the gradual concentration of industries in newly created industrial estates. However, there are no limits on the extraction of water from more than 25,000 existing wells, water distribution losses remain high, the use of efficient irrigation techniques remains limited and untreated wastewater continues to be discharged into the environment. The challenges thus are far from being resolved. In 2006 the government has temporary revived plans for an expensive scheme to bring in water from the Euphrates river, located more than 400 km from Damascus.

The Syrian intellectual and former banker Elie ElHadj has advocated that inter-basin transfer schemes should be abandoned and argues in favor of a "local solution to a local crisis". According to him, "reallocation of water away from agriculture to householders’ use, supplemented by efficient modern irrigation technology is the efficient solution to Damascus Region’s water crisis in terms of economic feasibility and water availability."

Subsequently a number of local solutions are described alongside the proposed inter-basin transfer.

=== Ban on drilling wells ===
In 2006, the authorities were forced to stop the implementation of a plan for the drilling of more than 200 wells for drinking water supply in several regions of the Ghouta, as nitrate concentrations from the excessive use of fertilizers and from untreated wastewater seeping into the ground were found in the range of 100-200 mg/L (the drinking water quality standard sets a limit of 40 mg/L). The drilling of new private wells has also been banned.

=== Demand management ===
Irrigation. With the assistance of JICA; the Ministry of Irrigation encouraged farmers in 2006 to switch to more efficient irrigation methods such as sprinklers. It has been estimated that saving water through installing more efficient irrigation systems such as sprinkler or drip irrigation would cost about US$0.15 per cubic meter, far less than bringing in new water from the Euphrates.

Municipal water use. In 2004, JICA completed a US$50m eight-year project to replace 100 km of water pipes across Damascus, which it said resulted “in a dramatic reduction in loss of water through pipe leakage from some 60 percent to 20 percent” in the sections covered However, the level of leakage remained high in other sections of the network. The Damascus utility also implements an awareness program in schools to make residents aware of the water imbalance in the basin and to encourage them to conserve water. Municipal demand management is complicated by the fact that residential water tariffs are very low. A typical residential water bill is the equivalent of about one or two Euros per household and month and thus provides little incentive to save water.

=== Wastewater treatment and reuse of reclaimed water ===
In 1999 the first wastewater treatment plant of Damascus was completed in Adra to the North-East of the city, treating a significant part of the sewage collected in the city. With a capacity of 485,000 m^{3}/day it is a large plant capable of treating the wastewater of more than 2 million people. The treated wastewater is discharged into irrigation canals in the Ghouta, where it irrigates 19,000 hectares of fruit trees. The plant was financed by the Arab Fund for Economic and Social Development. The government plans to build a total of 30 wastewater treatment plants throughout Greater Damascus, including in towns in the Barada gorge. The European Investment Bank is financing the construction of four wastewater treatment plants to serve more than 400,000 inhabitants in the Southwest of Damascus. The bids for the design, construction and maintenance of the plants were published in 2008. The Syrian-Qatari investment company plans to build a wastewater treatment plant in Jaramana Southeast of Damascus. Germany is also financing a wastewater treatment plant and associated sewers in the Yarmouk area South of Damascus.

In order to tackle the problem of industries scattered throughout the city that discharge untreated or poorly treated wastewater into the sewer network or into open streams, the government has built and is constantly expanding a modern industrial estate in Adra near Damascus. Treatment facilities will be provided according to the type of industrial processes. The goal is to gradually relocate all industries to this and other planned industrial estates.

=== Groundwater recharge ===
During winter some of the flow of the Fijeh springs exceeds demand and thus flows into the Barada river. The government plans to transfer some of this water through the existing pipelines, chlorinate it and inject it through recharge wells into the aquifer below Damascus to store it for use during summer. Pilot recharge projects have been initiated at various locations in the city using different recharge technologies. So far, the amount of water recharged remains limited and the large-scale feasibility of this option remains to be tested.

=== Mega-projects to tap new water sources ===
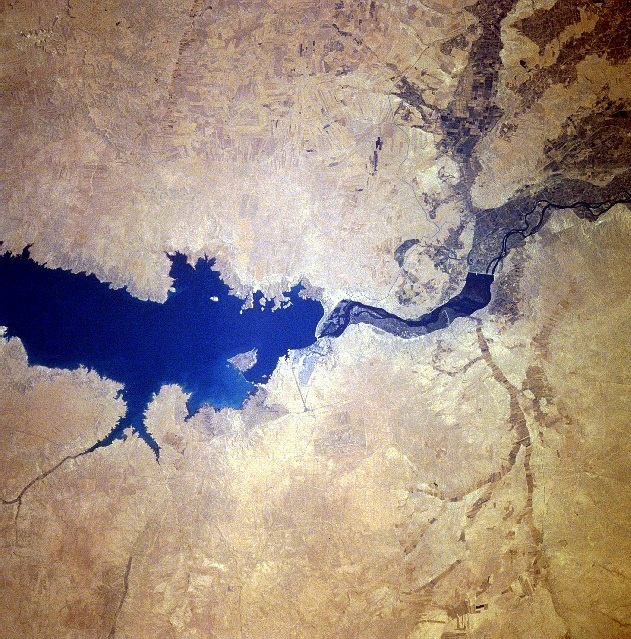
Euphrates Lake, a potential source of water supply for Damascus, pictured from space, June 1996.

The Syrian government has at various times considered two alternative mega-projects to bring additional water to the Greater Damascus area. One plan consisted in the transfer of water from the coastal region over a distance of at least 225 km and a cumulated difference in altitude of about 1000m. The water sources considered were two reservoirs in the coastal basin and even offshore springs in the Mediterranean or desalination of seawater at a total cost of more than US$1 per cubic meter including its transfer. By 2010 this plan was considered to have been abandoned. The other plan consists in building a pipeline from the Euphrates River. In 2006 Syrian officials said they were “pressing ahead” with a feasibility study by a Swiss company to transfer water from the Euphrates to Damascus at an estimated cost of US$2 billion. The project would involve conveying water from Euphrates Lake, some 441 kilometers away with pumping over an altitude of 712 meters. A capacity of 850 million m3 per annum has been envisaged, about twice the current water deficit in Greater Damascus. The cost for bulk water before distribution losses would be more than US$0.50 per cubic meter.

Given very low water tariffs and the lack of political willingness to increase tariffs, any mega-project would have to be heavily subsidized by the government, which does not appear to have the resources to substantially increase the subsidies to the sector beyond their current level.

== See also ==
- Water resources management in Syria
- Water supply and sanitation in Syria
