= Khabur ware =

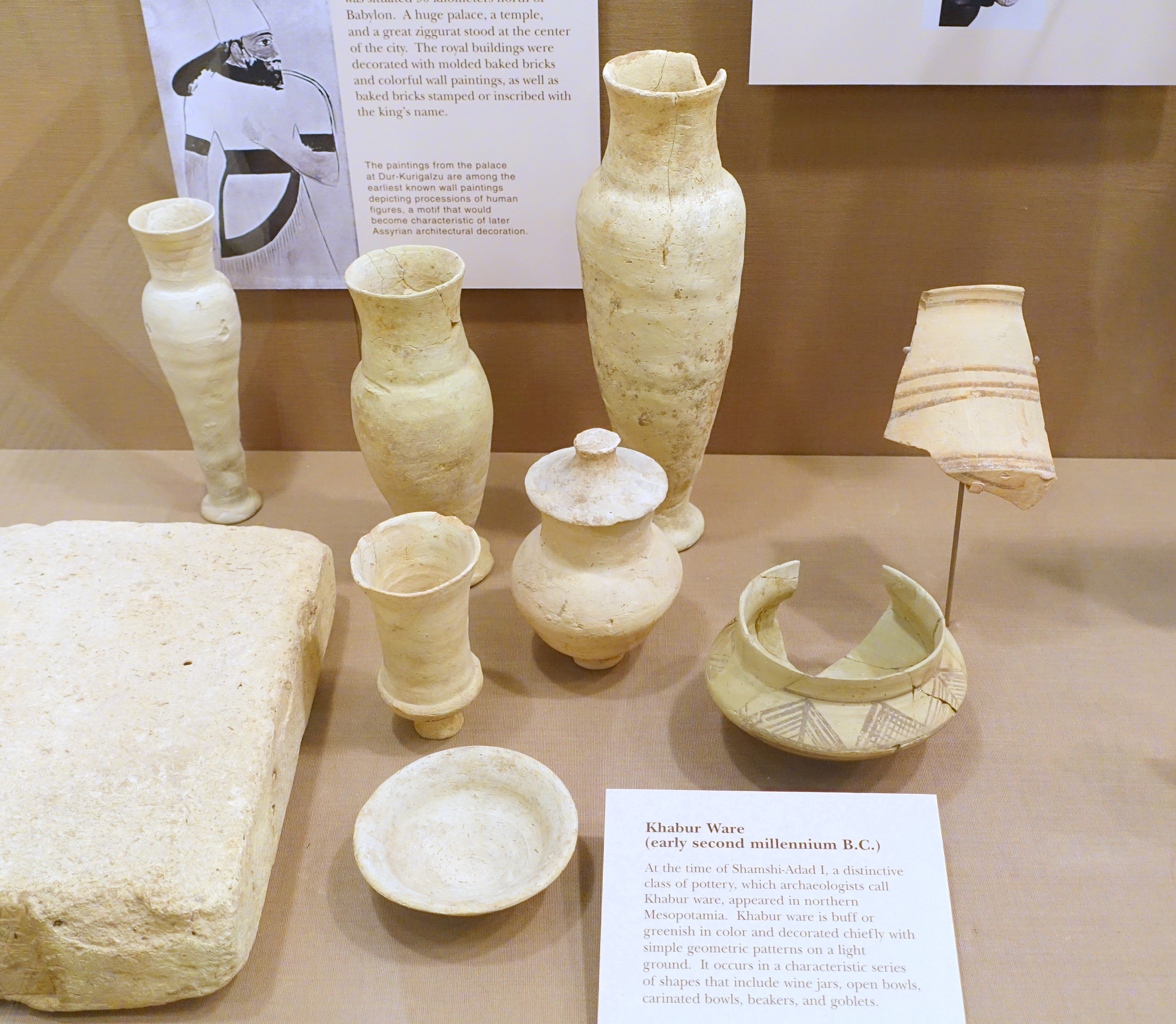
Khabur ware in the University of Chicago Oriental Institute

Khabur ware is a specific type of pottery named after the Khabur River region, in northeastern Syria, where large quantities of it were found by the archaeologist Max Mallowan at the site of Chagar Bazar. The pottery's distribution is not confined to the Khabur region, but spreads across northern Iraq and is also found at a few sites in Turkey and Iran.

Archaeologists believe the Kingdom of Upper Mesopotamia ruler Shamshi-Adad I used Khabur ware.

== Overview ==
=== History ===
Four main Khabur ware phases are established, 1–4. While the starting date for phase 1 is inconclusive, a tentative date of ca. 1900 BC is suggested based on evidence from Tell Brak. The beginning of the second, and the main, phase of Khabur ware is dated to the reign of Shamshi-Adad I (ca. 1813 BC), based on evidence from Chagar Bazar, Tell al-Rimah, Tell Taya and Tell Leilan. The third phase of Khabur ware is dated to ca. 1750, and lasts until ca. 1550. The fourth and last phase, is a period shared between Khabur ware and Nuzi ware, and ends with its disappearance ca. 1400 BC.

=== Designs ===
The pottery is wheel-made and decorated with monochrome designs in red, brown or black. The designs found on the pottery are combinations of simple motifs, usually geometric with horizontal bands, triangles and others. Nuzi ware shares similarities.

== Gallery ==
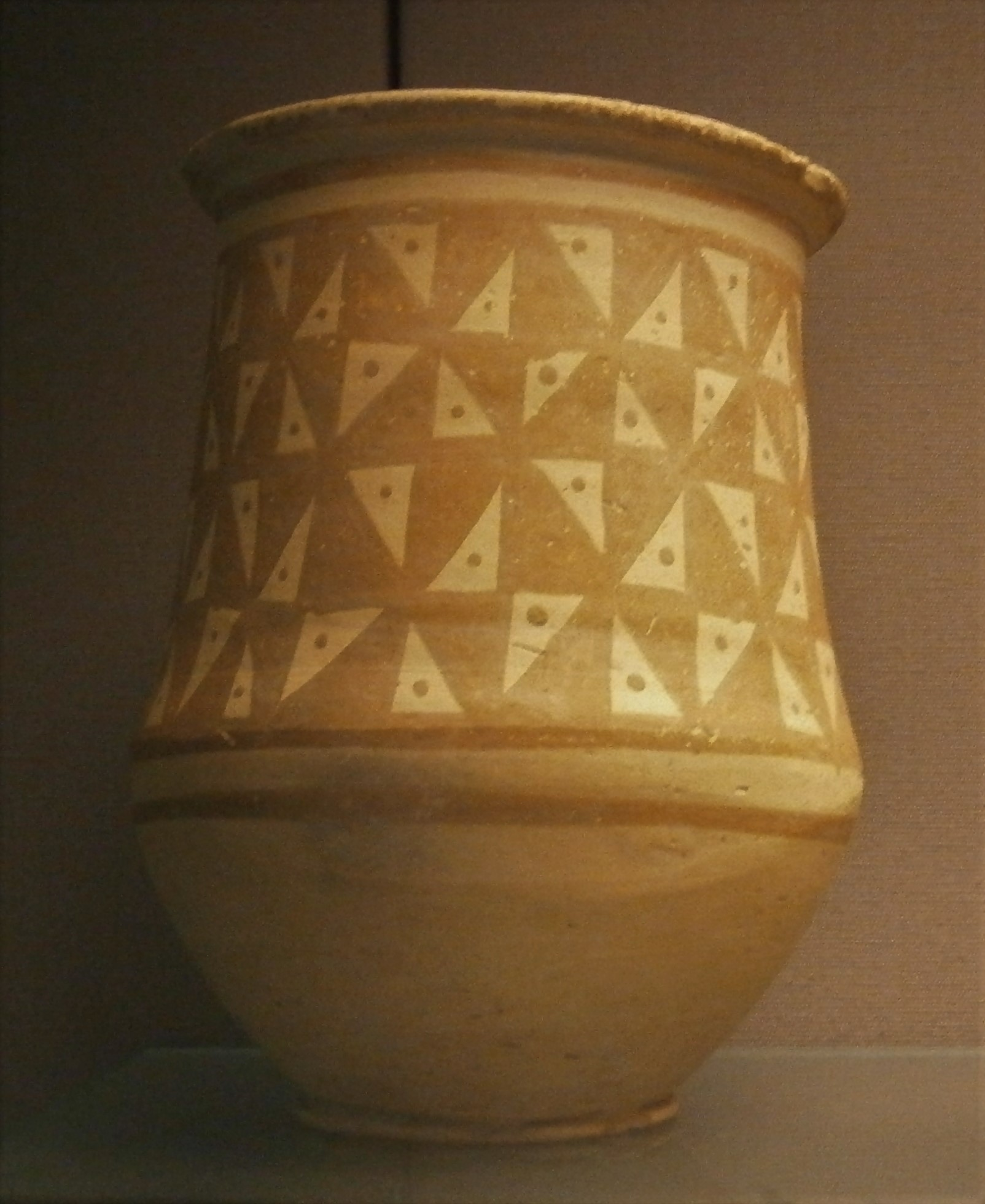
Khabur ware jar from Tell Brak. British Museum.

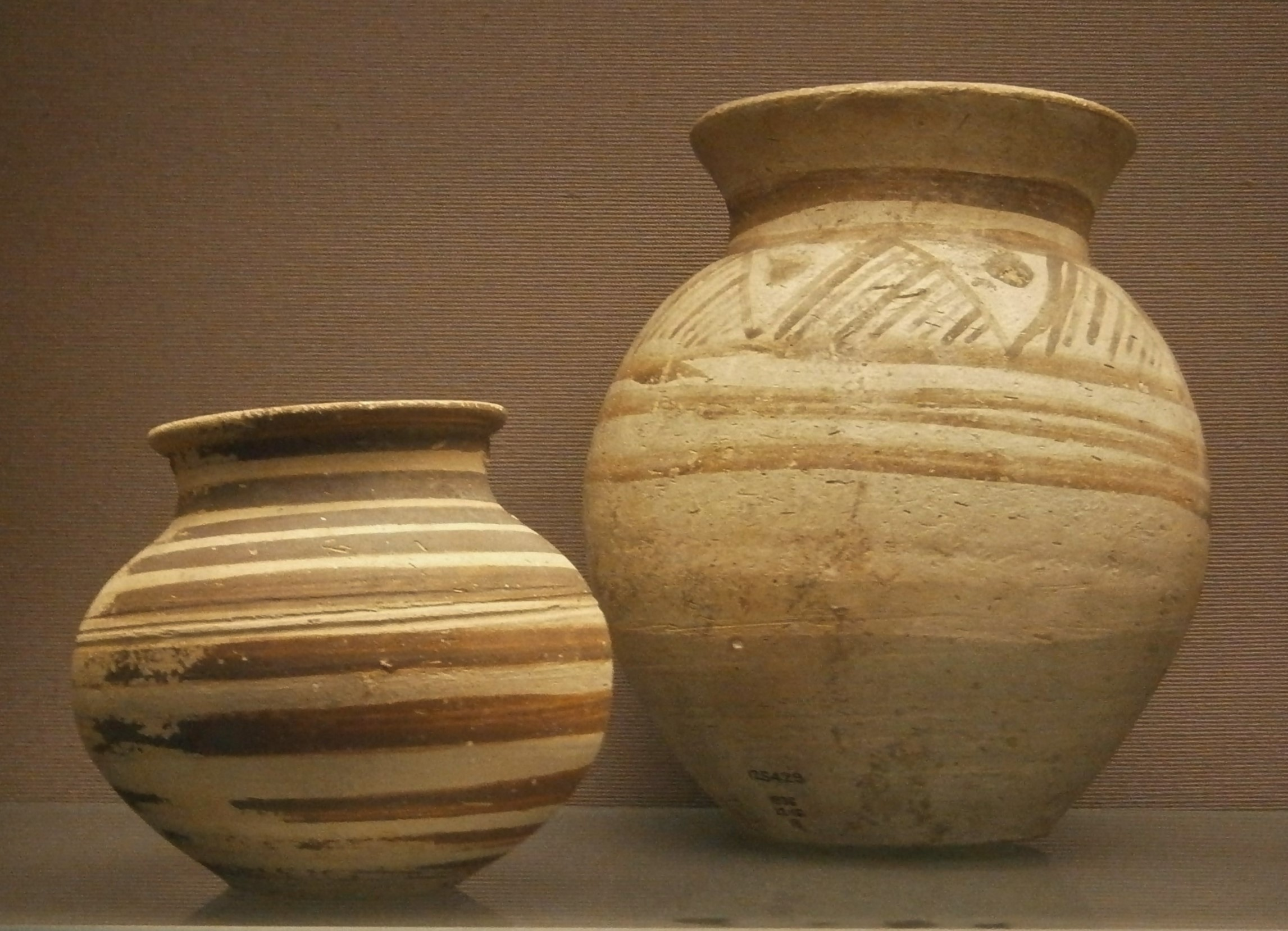
Two Khabur ware jars from Chagar Bazar. British Museum.

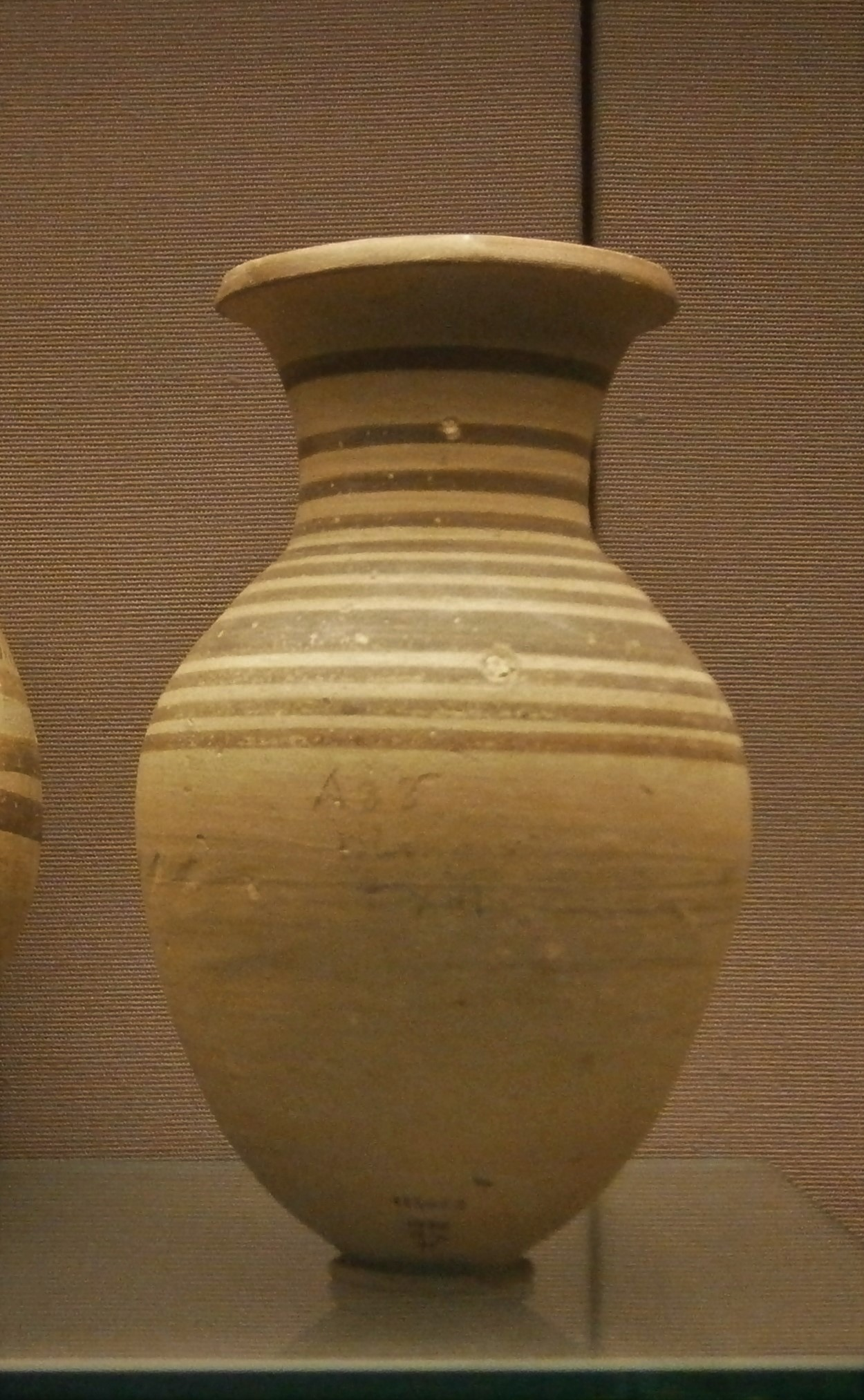
Khabur ware jar from Chagar Bazar. British Museum.
