= Wadi Avedji =

River in Syria

The Wadi Avedji is a river in northeastern Syria. It is a tributary of the upper Khabur River.
