= Wadi al-Kheder =

Watercourse in Syria

The Wadi al-Kheder is a river in Syria. It a tributary of the Balikh River.
