= Wadi Jarrah =

River in Syria

Coordinates: 36°41′N 41°18′E

The Wadi Jarrah (Arabic: وادي جراح) is a river in northeastern Syria. It is a tributary of the Khabur River.
