= Ain al-Arous =

Ain al-Arous عين العروس
- Village
- Location in Syria
- Coordinates: 36°40′5″N 38°55′57″E
- Country: Syria
- Governorate: Raqqa Governorate
- District: Tell Abyad District
- Time zone: UTC+3 (EET)
  - Summer (DST): UTC+2 (EEST)

Ain al-Arous (Arabic: عين العروس) is a Syrian village in Tal Abyad District, in Raqqa Governorate, located 3 km south of the city of Tal Abyad, 92 km north of the city of Raqqa, 200 km east of the city of Aleppo and 420 km north of the capital Damascus. It is near the border with Turkey. The Balikh River rises from it.

== History ==
The village was known as "Al-Zahbaniyah" (الذهبانية), as mentioned in Mu'jam Al-Buldan by Yaqut al-Hamawi. It has a station of Abraham as reported by Ibn Jubayr, and a watermill built in 1908.

In 1938, the location was examined by Sir Max Mallowan and his wife Agatha Christie, in which it was mentioned in Come, Tell Me How You Live. The village was also visited by Asmahan in the 1940s.
