= Wadi Radd =

Tributary of the Khabur River in Syria

Coordinates: 36°38′25″N 41°04′24″E

The Wadi Radd (Arabic: وادي الرد) is a tributary of the Khabur River in Syria. Yarmouk (Syria) lies near the bank of the Wadi Radd.
