= Wadi Qaramogh =

Watercourse in Syria

The Wadi Qaramogh is a tributary of the Balikh River in Syria. It drains west of the Balikh Valley, feeding the Balikh stream. The Wadi Qaramogh can transport considerable amounts of water after heavy rainfall, and large limestone blocks can be found in its lower course.
