= Wadi Khanzir =

The Wadi Khanzir is a river in northeastern Syria. It is a tributary of the upper Khabur River.
