= Daysan River =

River in Urfa, Turkey

Coordinates: 36°43′1″N 39°0′0″E

The Daysan River (also spelt Daisan and known in Arabic as Al-Jullab or as Daysan) was the name of a perennial river that flowed through the city of Urfa (historically called Edessa and known in Arabic and Syriac as al-Ruha') in the Arabian Plate.

A combination of 25 streams, it ran through Urfa and Harran (ancient Carrhae) before joining the Balikh river (also spelt Belichas), one of the largest tributaries to the Euphrates, at ancient Dabanas (modern Dibni) in Raqqa in the Eastern Mediterranean conifer-sclerophyllous-broadleaf forests ecoregion. Today it runs dry before reaching the Balikh, and numerous dried-up wells in the old city of Harran suggest that the water table may have been significantly higher in the past.

The Syriac writer Bardaisan takes his name from the river, as it is said he was born on its banks the very day his mother migrated to Urfa.

== Name ==
Historically it was known as the Scirtus (Ancient Greek: Σκίρτος) meaning "skipping or jumping", in reference to its rapid course and its frequent overflowings that occurred during the winter, in stark contrast to its calm waters in the summer. Its modern name is the Syriac translation of the Greek σκιρτάω, literally meaning "dancing".

== History ==
The river has flooded Urfa numerous times, including in 201, 204, 303, 305, 415, and 525 AD. The latter was an absolute catastrophy, bursting the city walls, flooding thousands of civilians, and destroying the palace and the cathedral. Therefore, Justinian was compelled that very year, through a man-made channel, to alter the course of the river from flowing through the western neighbourhoods of the city so that it would pass outside the city at the slopes of the western hills.

During this time, the Eddessan identity was under a lot of Parthian influence, with its Assyrian schools of thought being labelled as Persian Christianity. Thus, the Edessans forgot their Aramaean and Nabataean origins, often calling their city “City of the Parthians” or “Daughter of the Parthians".

Procopius of Caesaria described it as a river of Mesopotamia, a western tributary of the Chaboras (modern Khabur), yet modern cartographic analyses suggest against the classical sources, concluding that the river is a tributary of the Balikh river.

It was in the past, like the rest of the Balikh basin of northern Syria, inhabited by Syriac-speaking Semites with small Greek and Arab minorities. In the 6th century, the Arab tribes of Mudar, Rabiah, Taghlib, and Bakr migrated to Upper Mesopotamia, leading to the region to be known as Diyar Mudar. Mass influx of Turks and Kurds began around the 13th centuries onwards.

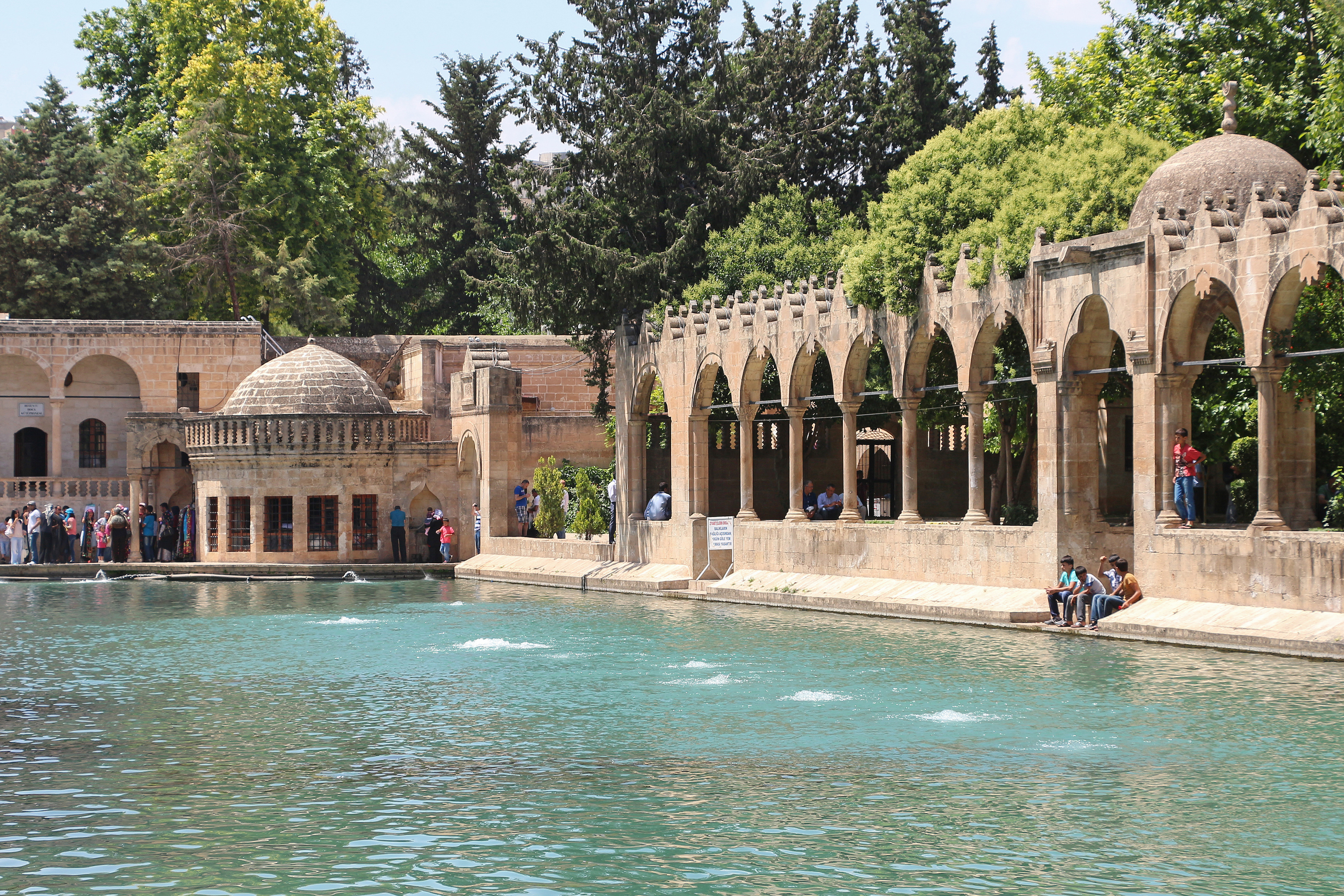
Birket (Arabic: pool of) Ibrahim

During the middle ages, the Daisan canal was further altered to flow from the north and into the east of the old walled city. Part of the former course survives as two fish pools, one called Ain Zleiha (out of which flow two streams that rejoin the river at a later point), and the other called Birket Ibrahim (historically known as Ain Al-Khalil). Tradition associates the latter with the patriarch Abraham, citing the tale of Abraham being saved by God after Nimrod throws him into a furnace for disobeying his orders of worshipping idols. Also, to the south of the stream's old course is a spring in a cave that is now converted into a mosque.

According to Sozomen's Ecclesiastical History, during the rule of the Abbasids a Manichaean heresy known as "al-daisaniyah" or "that which came from Daisan" rose in Iraq, which led to debates with Islamic philosophers and theologians of the time, the most notable being the debate between Abu Shakir al-Daisani and Hisham ibn al-Hakam al-Kufi, a student of Imam Ja'far ibn Muhammad al-Sadiq.
