= Barada =

Coordinates: 33°30′48.75″N 36°18′18″E

Barada Arabic: بَرَدَىٰ
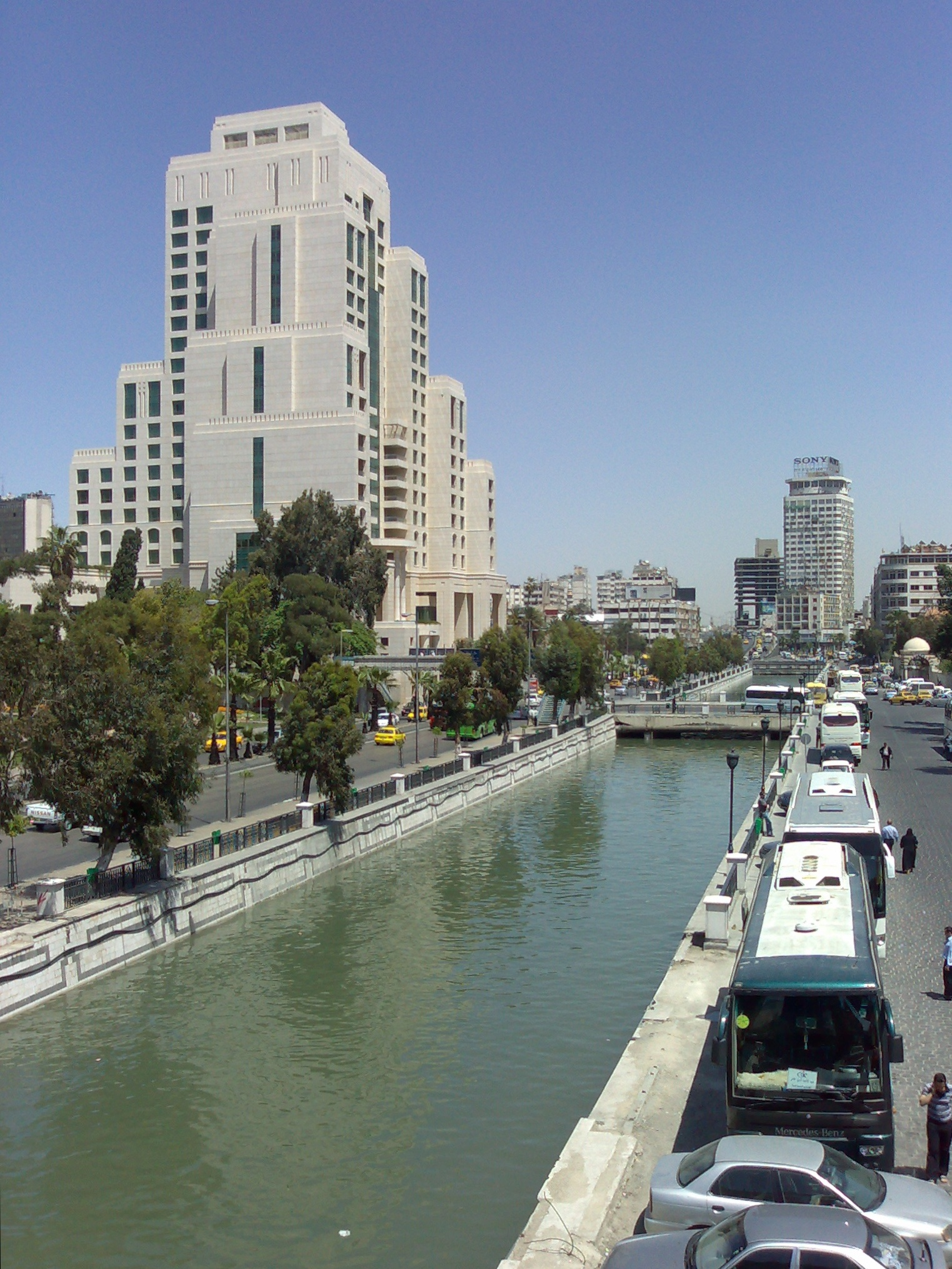
- Barada river in Damascus near the Four Seasons Hotel. The water level is uncharacteristically high in this view from the spring of 2009.
- Etymology: From barid, meaning 'cold' in Semitic languages

Location
- Country: Syria
- City: Damascus

The Barada (Arabic: بَرَدَىٰ / ALA-LC: Baradā) is the main river of Damascus, the capital city of Syria.

== Etymology ==
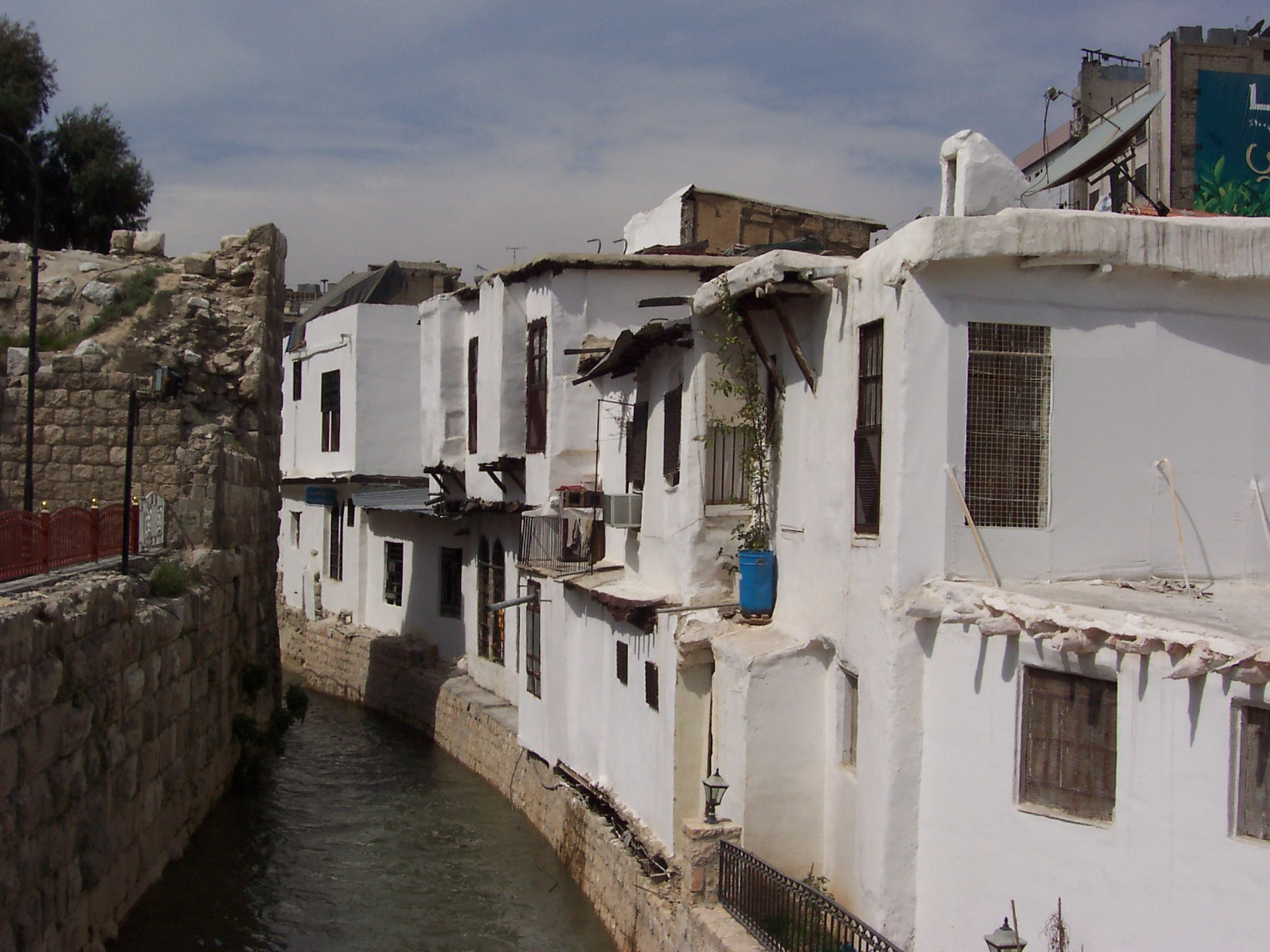
Barada river near the Citadel of Damascus, 2006

The word "Barada" is thought to be derived from the word barid, which means "cold" in Semitic languages. The ancient Greek name (Greek: Χρυσορρόας, romanized: Chrysorrhoas), means "streaming with gold".

== Topography and source ==
Throughout the arid plateau region east of Damascus, oases, streams, and a few minor rivers that empty into swamps and small lakes provide water for local irrigation. Most important of these is the Barada, a river that rises in the Anti-Lebanon Mountains and disappears into the desert. The Barada flows out of the karst spring of Ain al-Fijah, about 27 kilometres (17 mi) north west of Damascus in the Anti-Lebanon Mountains, but its true source is Lake Barada, a small lake that is also a karst spring located about 8 kilometres (5.0 mi) from Al-Zabadani. The Barada descends through a steep, narrow gorge named "Rabwe" before it arrives at Damascus, where it divides into seven branches that irrigate the Al Ghutah (الغوطة) oasis, the location of Damascus. Eventually the Ghouta reached a size of 370 square kilometers, although in the 1980s urban growth started replacing agricultural use with housing and industry. The river has suffered from severe drought in the following decades, mainly due to the lower rainfall rates and the large increase in the population in the area. It also suffers from serious pollution, especially in the summer, when there is almost no flow and little water in the basin.

In early 2026, the Barada river showed increased but unstable flow due to heavy rainfall, prompting precautionary measures in areas such as al-Otaybah within its drainage basin. Local authorities carried out channel cleaning to regulate water flow, prevent flooding, and support irrigation, as rising water levels from storms led to runoff and temporary surges in the river system.

== Biblical mention ==
The Barada is identified as Abana (or Amana, in Qere and Ketiv variation in Tanakh and classical Chrysorrhoas), which is the more important of the two rivers of Damascus, Syria, and was mentioned in the Book of Kings (2 Kings 5:12). As the Barada rises in the Anti-Libanus and escapes from the mountains through a narrow gorge, its waters debouch fan-like, in canals or rivers, the name of one of which, the River Banias, retains a trace of Abana.

John MacGregor, who gives a description of them in his book Rob Roy on the Jordan, affirms that as a work of hydraulic engineering the system and construction of the canals, by which the Abana and Pharpar were used for irrigation, might be considered as one of the most complete and extensive in the world. In the Bible, Naaman exclaims that the Abana and Pharpar are greater than all the waters of Israel.

== Branching ==
The Barada branches at the village of Hameh and the gorge of Rabweh into six distributaries or canals, two of which, Yazid and Tora, branch off the northern bank whilst the remaining four, Mezzawi, Derani, Qanawat and Banias, are formed from the southern bank.

The Yazid canal runs north to the districts of Salihya and Qabun; Tora, the oldest of all, passes through the district of Al-Jisr Al-Abyad, heading to Jobar and Harasta; Mezzawi tears through Mezzeh; Derani runs towards Darya; Banias runs by the National Museum north of the Citadel and reaches Bab Touma; and finally the Qanawat canal pours into the southern quarters of the old city following Via Recta.

Outside the city of Damascus, the water gathers to pour into the River Qleit, which runs to Eastern Ghouta.

== Gallery ==
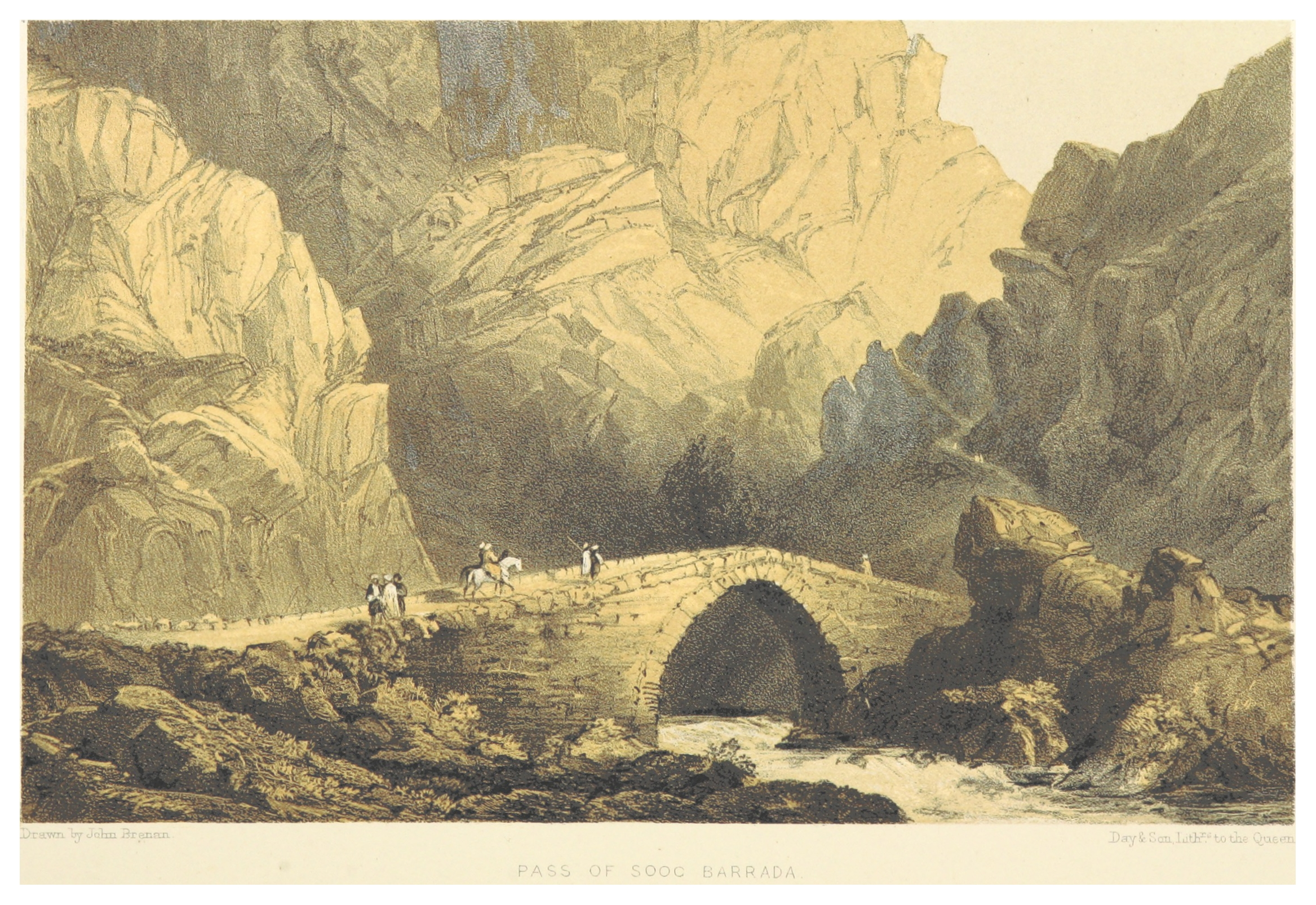
The upper valley of the Barada in the Anti-Lebanon Mountains 1855

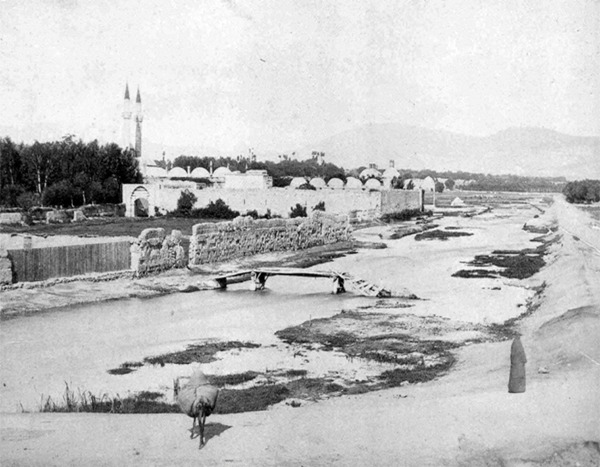
Barada river 1868

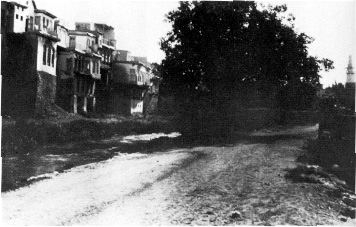
Barada river around 1930

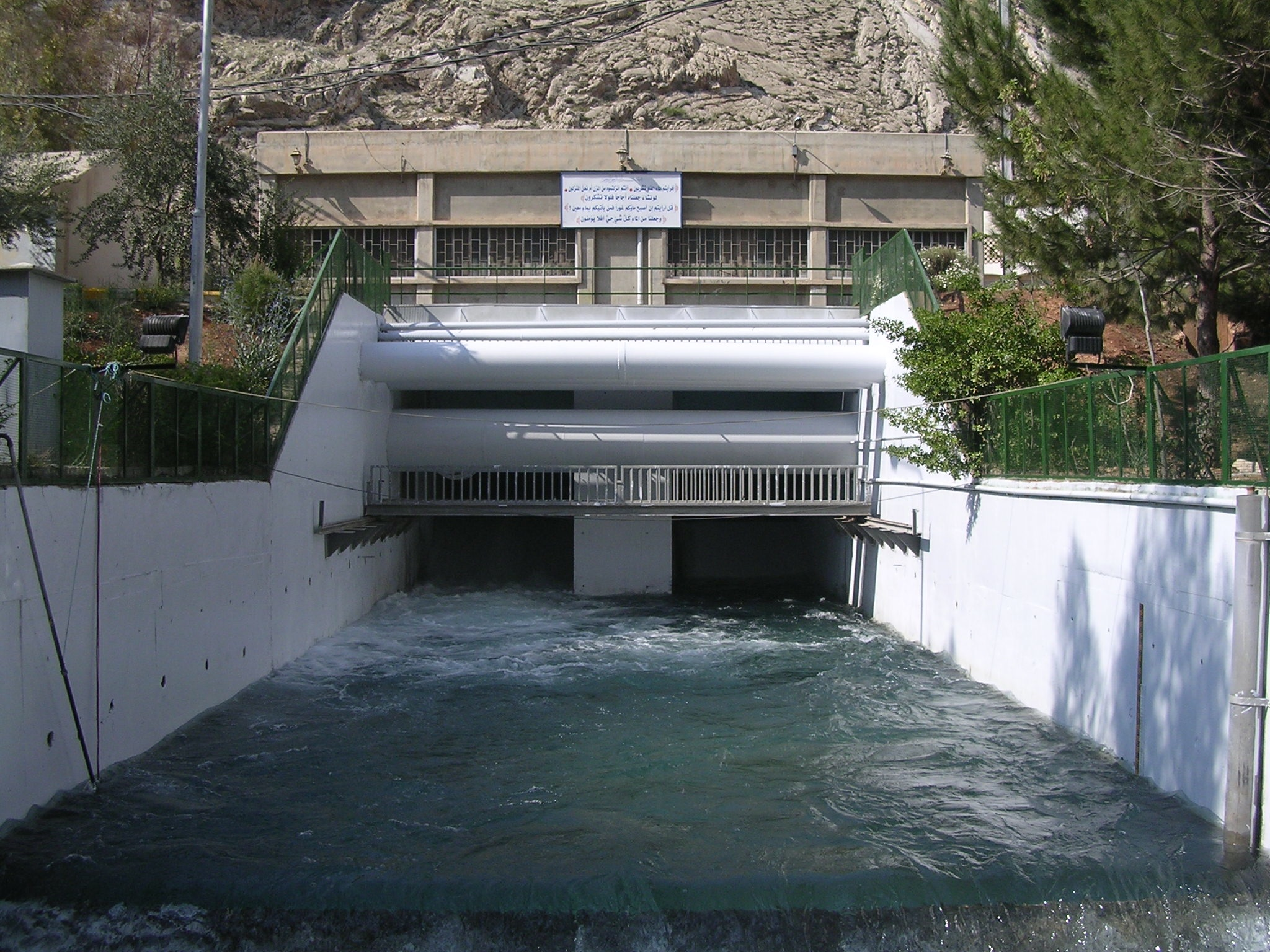
Feeja Spring in 2007

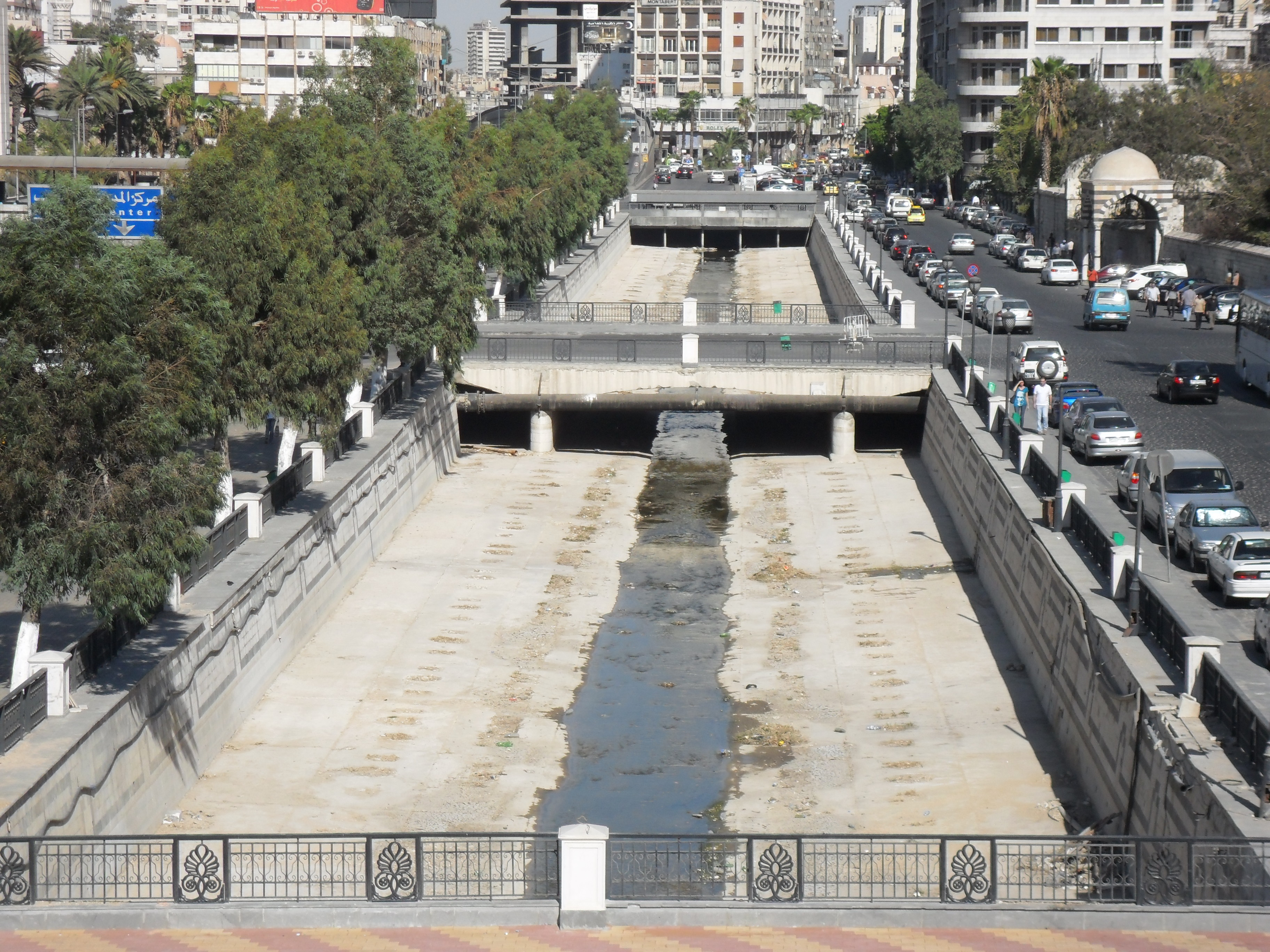
The dry riverbed Barada in August 2010

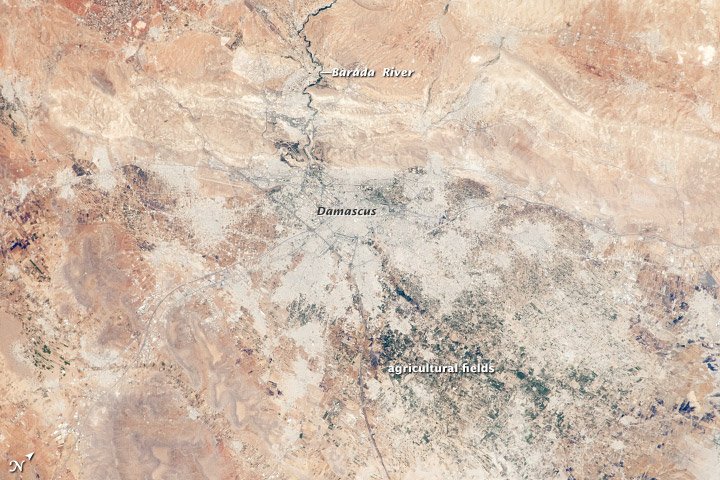
Annotated view of Barada and Damascus with surroundings, as seen from space in 2013

== See also ==
- Ghouta
- Water resources management in Greater Damascus

== External links and further reading ==
- Before Vanishing, a 2005 documentary short about the decline of Barada (French titles, no narration).
- Singer, Isidore; et al., eds. (1901–1906). "Abana". The Jewish Encyclopedia. New York: Funk & Wagnalls.
- De Chatel, Francesca (January 2008). "A Drought in Eden". Syria Today.
