= Khabur =

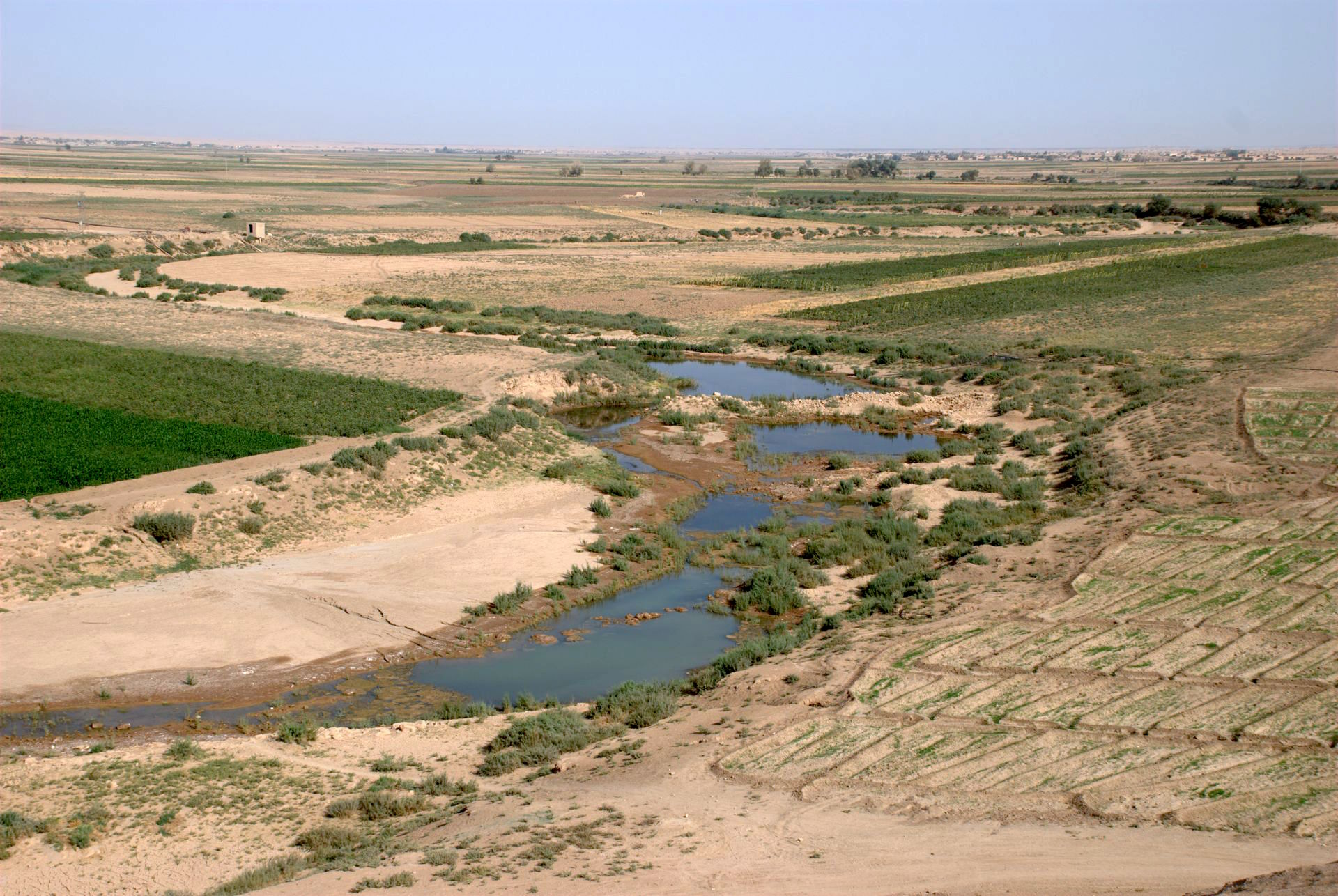
- Khabur south of Al-Hasakah

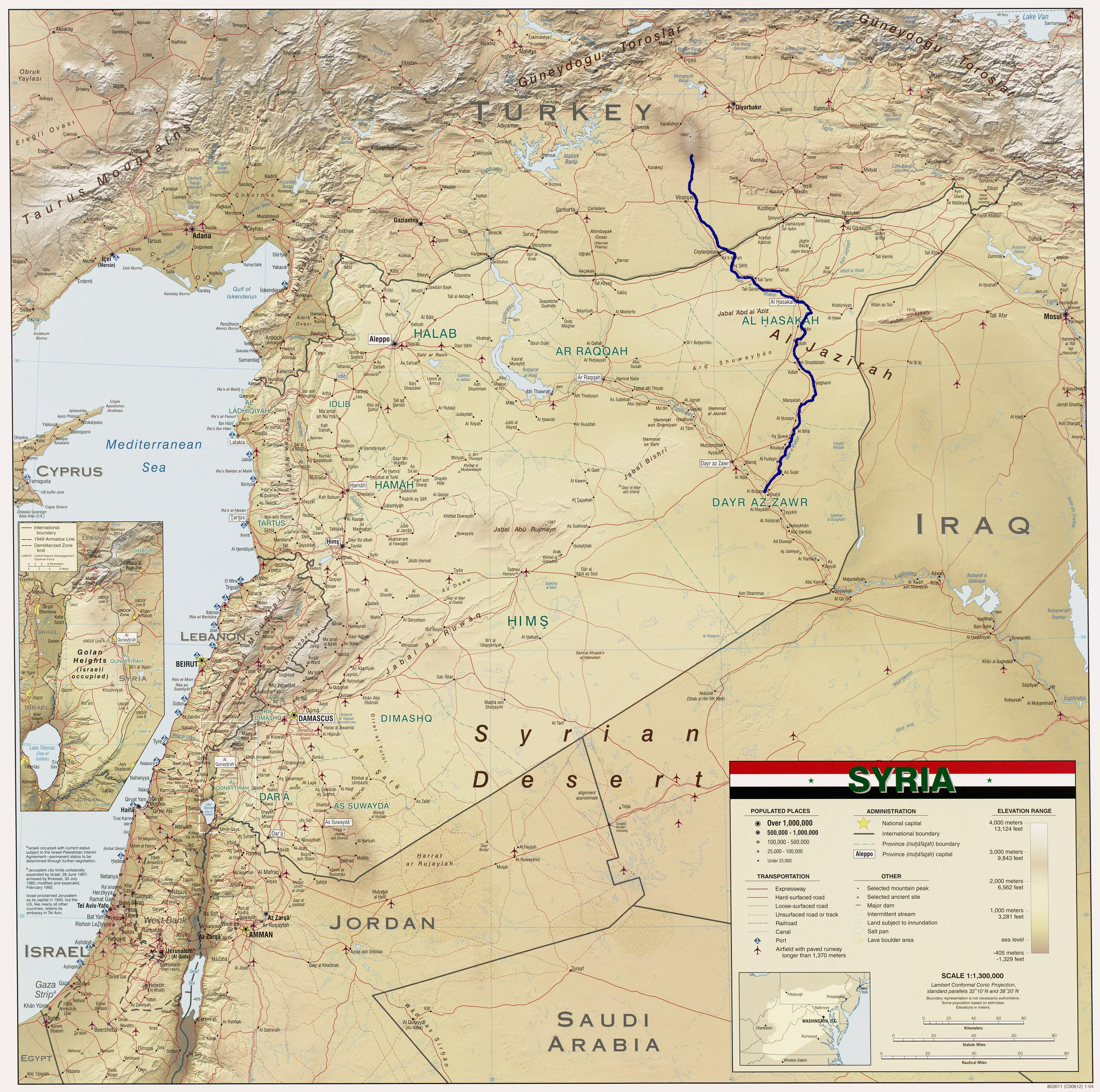
- Native name: نهر الخابور (Arabic); ܢܗܪܐ ܚܒܪ (Syriac); Çemê Xabûr (Kurdish); Habur Nehri (Turkish)

Location
- Country: Syria, Turkey
- City: Ra's al-'Ayn, Al-Hasakah, Busayrah

Physical characteristics
- Source: Ras al-Ayn
  - elevation: 350 m (1,150 ft)
- Mouth: Euphrates
  - coordinates: 35°8′33″N 40°25′51″E
- Length: 486 km (302 mi)
- Basin size: 37,081 km^{2} (14,317 sq mi)
- Discharge
  - average: 45 m^{3}/s (1,600 cu ft/s)
  - minimum: 2 m^{3}/s (71 cu ft/s)
  - maximum: 57 m^{3}/s (2,000 cu ft/s)

The Khabur River is the largest perennial tributary to the Euphrates in Syria. Although the Khabur originates in Turkey, the karstic springs around Ras al-Ayn are the river's main source of water. Several important wadis join the Khabur north of Al-Hasakah, together creating what is known as the Khabur Triangle, or Upper Khabur area. From north to south, annual rainfall in the Khabur basin decreases from over 400 mm to less than 200 mm. This has made the river a vital water source for agriculture throughout history. The Khabur joins the Euphrates near the town of Busayrah.

== Name ==
In ancient times, the river was known in Akkadian and Amorite as ḫabur, in Hebrew: חָבוֹר, romanized: ḥāḇōr, and in Old Aramaic: 𐤇𐤁𐤅𐤓, romanized: ḥbwr.

The river was well noted by ancient writers, with various names used by various writers: Ptolemy and Pliny the Elder called it the Chaboras (Ancient Greek: Χαβώρας), Procopius called it the Chabura, Strabo, Zosimus, and Ammianus Marcellinus called it the Aborrhas (Ἀβόρρας), and Isidore of Charax called it the Aburas (Ἀβούρας). It was described as a large river of Mesopotamia which rose in Mons Masius, about 40 miles (64 km) from Nisibis, and flowed into the Euphrates at Circesium (Kerkesiah).

== Geography ==
The course of the Khabur can be divided into two distinct zones: the Upper Khabur area or Khabur Triangle north of Al-Hasakah, and the Middle and Lower Khabur between Al-Hasakah and Busayrah.

=== Tributaries ===
The river is fed by several smaller streams, the names of which are mentioned by the later classical writers. These are, the Scirtus (Procop. de Aedif. 2.7), the Cordes (Procop. de Aedif. 2.2), and the Mygdonius (Julian. Or. i.).

The tributaries to the Khabur are listed from east to west. Most of these wadis only carry water for part of the year.

- Wadi Radd
- Wadi Jarrah
- Jaghjagh River (ancient Mygdonius)
- Wadi Khanzir
- Wadi Avedji

== History ==
Since the 1930s, numerous archaeological excavations and surveys have been carried out in the Khabur Valley, indicating that the region has been occupied since the Lower Palaeolithic period. Important sites that have been excavated include Tell Halaf, Tell Brak, Tell Leilan, Tell Mashnaqa, Tell Mozan and Tell Barri. The region has given its name to a distinctive painted ware found in northern Mesopotamia and Syria in the early 2nd millennium BCE, called Khabur ware. The region of the Khabur River is also associated with the rise of the Kingdom of the Mitanni that flourished c. 1500–1300 BC.

The Khabur River is mentioned in the Hebrew Bible: "Tiglath-Pileser ... took the Reubenites, the Gadites and the half tribe of Manasseh into exile. He took them to Halah, Habor (Khabur), Hara and the River Gozan, where they are to this day". The identification of the Khabur with the Habor is not contested.

The Khabur river was sometimes identified with the Chebar or Kebar, the location of Tel Abib and setting of several important scenes of the Book of Ezekiel. However, recent scholarship identifies the Chebar as the ka-ba-ru waterway mentioned among the 5th century BCE Murushu archives from Nippur, close to Nippur and the Shatt el-Nil, a silted up canal toward the east of Babylon.

The ancient city of Corsote, visited by Cyrus the Younger on his ill-fated expedition against the Persians as told by Xenophon, was located at the confluence of the Khabur River, known by them as the 'Mascas', and the Euphrates according to Robin Waterfield. Other authors have been circumspect upon the precise location of Corsote due to the changing names and courses of the rivers since that time.

Ptolemy (5.18.6) mentions a town called Chabora (Χαβώρα), on the Euphrates, which he places near Nicephorion, and which probably derives its name from the river, and Theophylact Simocatta mentions Ἀβορέων φρούριον, which is, as certainly, the same place. Procopius speaks of it as a river of importance, and Ammianus states that Julian the Apostate crossed it "per navalem Aborae pontem". Strabo describes it as near the town of Anthemusias.

In the seventh and eight century, several monasteries from the Tur Abdin such as the monastery of Qartmin, the monastery of Mar Awgin and the monastery of Mar Yoḥannān Ṭayyāyā, owned farmland in the upper Khabur valley and often had depended monasteries, so-called Lower Monasteries. As such, Simeon, who was a monk and administrator at the Qartmin abbey, planted 12,000 trees at the Lower Monastery near Sisauranon (which earned him the name 'of the olives').

=== Modern Khabur River Valley ===
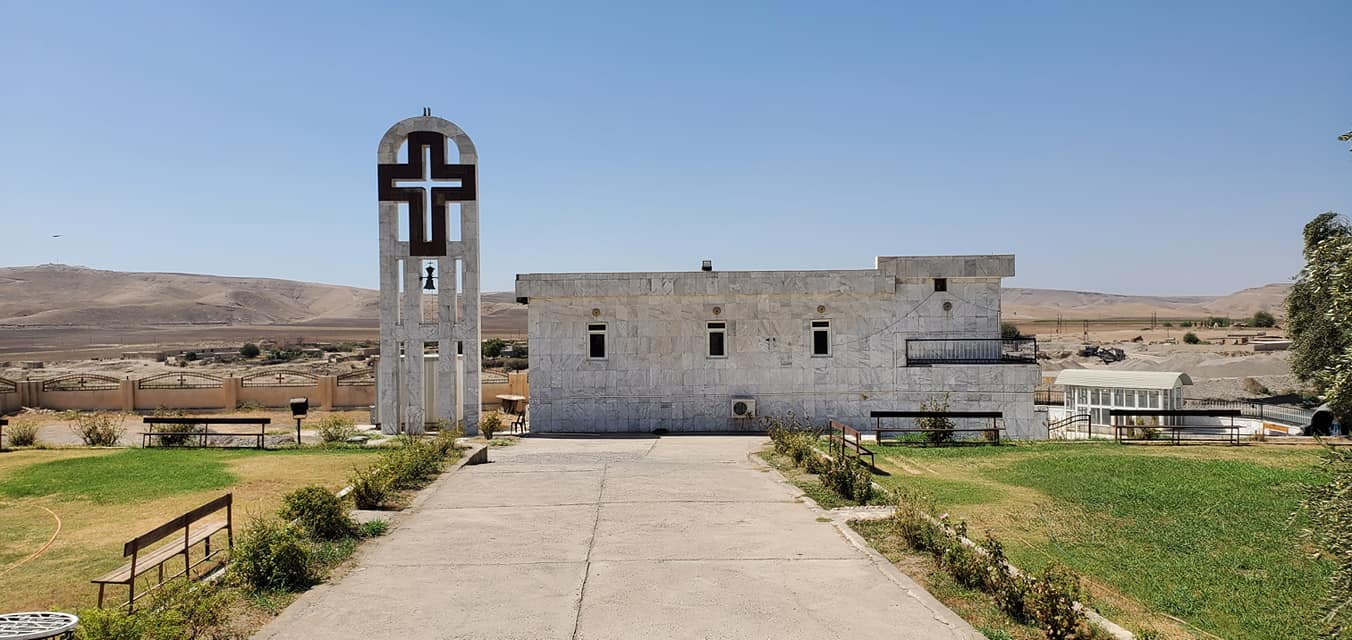
Assyrian Church in Khabur River Valley.

The Khabur River Project, begun in the 1960s, involved the construction of a series of dams and canals. Three dams were built in the Khabur Basin as part of a large irrigation scheme that also includes the Tabqa Dam on the Euphrates. The section of the Khabur River within Tell Tamer Subdistrict are home to a self-governing Assyrian enclave. Two dams, Hasakah West and Hasakah East, have been constructed on tributaries to the Khabur between Ra's al-'Ayn and Al-Hasakah. The capacity of the reservoir of Hasakah West is 0.09 km^{3}, and is also the southeastern end of the Assyrian enclave. The capacity of Hasakah East is 0.2 km^{3}. A third dam, Hassakeh South, was constructed on the Khabur 25 km south of Al-Hasakah. The reservoir of this dam has a capacity of 0.7 km^{3}. The Khabur Valley, which now has about four million acres (16,000 km^{2}) of farmland, is Syria's main wheat-cultivation area. The northeastern part is also the center for Syria's oil production.
