= Brak =

Brak may refer to:

== Arts, entertainment, and media ==
- Brak (character), a character on 1966 Hanna-Barbera cartoon Space Ghost
  - The Brak Show, a 2000 animated series
- Brak, a barbarian character in a series of stories by John Jakes
- Brak, a supporting character in 1955 science fiction film This Island Earth

== Places ==
- Brak, Libya, a city in Libya
  - Brak Airport
- Tell Brak, an ancient city in Syria
- Tell Brak (village), a village in Syria

== Other uses ==
- Brak (title) (or Braque), former title for the kings of Waalo, part of present-day Senegal
- Syd Brak, South African illustrator

== See also ==
- Brack (disambiguation)
- Great Brak River (disambiguation)
- Little Brak River (disambiguation)
