= Tell Hazna =

Archaeological site near Al-Hasakah, Syria

Tell Hazna I
- Location within Syria Location within Near East
- 36°39′41″N 40°53′44″E
- Type: Settlement
- Periods: Hassuna, Uruk, Ubaid,Early Dynastic
- Location: Al-Hasakah Governorate, Syria

Site notes
- Excavation dates: 1988–2010
- Archaeologists: Rauf Magometovich Munchaev

Tell Hazna (also Tell Khazna) is an archaeological site located in al-Hasakah, Syria in the Khabur river basin to the northeast of Al-Hasakah, inhabited during the Early Dynastic I–II Periods, and Uruk and Ubaid periods. It is located 14 km (8.7 mi) west of the ancient site of Tell Brak and 25 km (16 mi) south of the ancient site of Chagar Bazar. It has two subsites, Tell Hazna I and Tell Hazna II. The small archaeological sites of Tell Nurek and Tell Diba are located within 1.5 km (0.93 mi).

Not to be confused with the Tell Khazna site in Iraq.

== History ==
The site of Tell Hazna I was occupied beginning around 3600 BC in the Late Chalcolithic 2 and 3 periods (Uruk period and Ubaid period) then after a brief hiatus around 2900 BC was occupied until around 2700 BC, Early Dynastic I and II, before being abandoned during the early Ninevite 5 period. In the final period the settlement public buildings went out of use and residential occupation was low level. The site of Tell Hazna II was occupied during the Hassuna period and possibly the Halaf period.

== Archaeology ==
=== Tell Hazna I ===
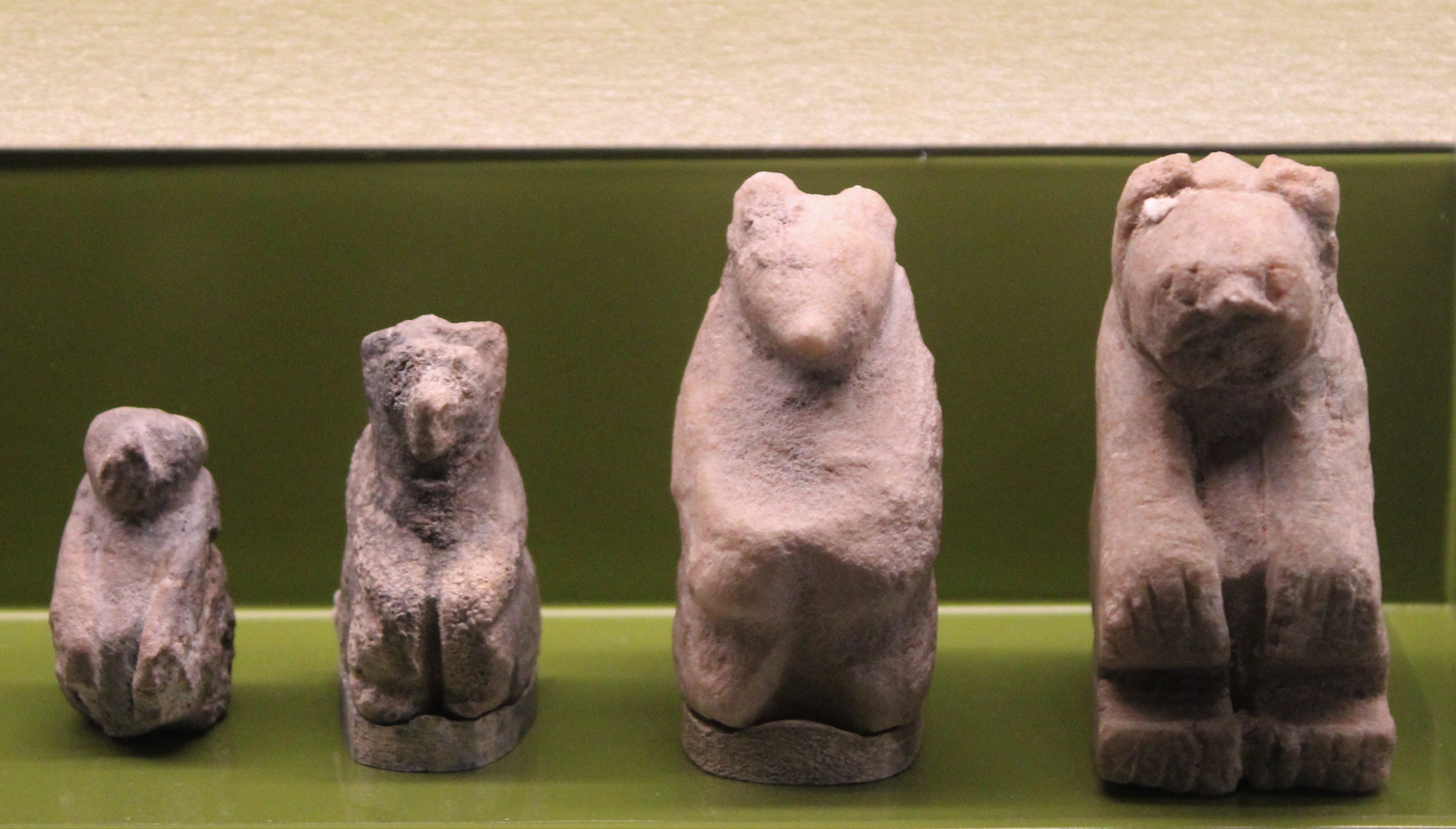
Stone bear figurines, Tell Brak.

Tell Hazna I is about 150 meters in diameter (2 hectares in area) and around 17 meters high (average height of 10 meters). The upper 12 meters of occupational remains belong to the Early Dynastic I–II Periods and the lower 4 meters to the Uruk and Ubaid periods. The site was excavated in 22 seasons between 1988 and 2010 by the Institute of Archaeology of Russian Academy of Sciences. An area of more than 2000 square meters was uncovered on the mounds southern and western slopes. The efforts of the Russian mission were mainly concentrated on the Early Dynastic Period, the remains of the proposed religious and administrative center.

Excavation revealed a monumental seven meter high wall with an exterior glacis only on the eastern side of the mound. Wall thickness varies with a maximum of 4 meters. This wall was interpreted as having a function of protecting the settlement from the strong winds and rain common at the site versus having a defensive function.

About 14 meters below the top of the mound a "massive structure" from the Uruk period was uncovered.

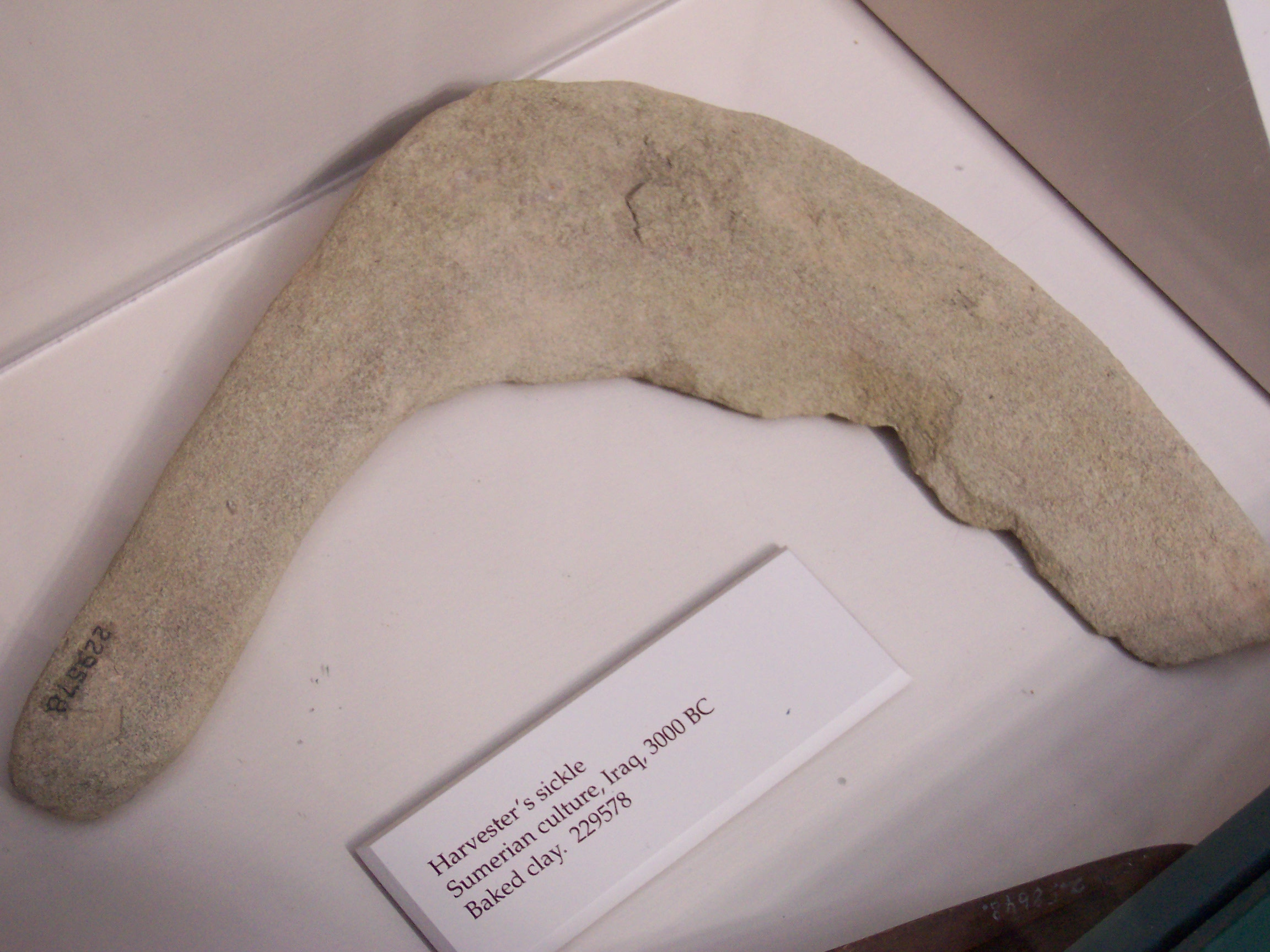
Sumerian harvesting sickle, c. 3000 BC

Excavation found that in the early part of the 3rd millennium BC (c. 2900-2700 BC) the top of the mound held a large multi-terraced complex of buildings (begun in the Uruk period) built on a mud brick platform (having a 3.3 meter wide enclosure wall) with towers and attached rooms. One tower, in the center of the complex, rose to 8 meters in height and had its own enclosure wall. It was in the form of a truncated pyramid which measured 6.5 meters at the base. The pyramid walls were constructed of 48 by 28 by 7 centimeters unbaked mud bricks and showed signs of having been strengthened and remodeled many times. The remaining walls are 2 meters thick and 8 meters high with traces of greenish clay plaster. Under the "upper ground" of the pyramid a 2.4 meter by 2.2 meter rectangular chamber with vaulted ceiling was excavated. In one room of that tower was found "striated ash layers containing grain, animal bones, and clay animal figurines". A niche in the tower held 17 unused clay sickle blades and a stamp seal. In another tower the excavators found a cache with "crystal, carnelian, jet, turquoise, bone, and shell, as well as silver pendants". After the complex fell out of use it was used for a time as a burial site with 25 intramural graves being excavated.

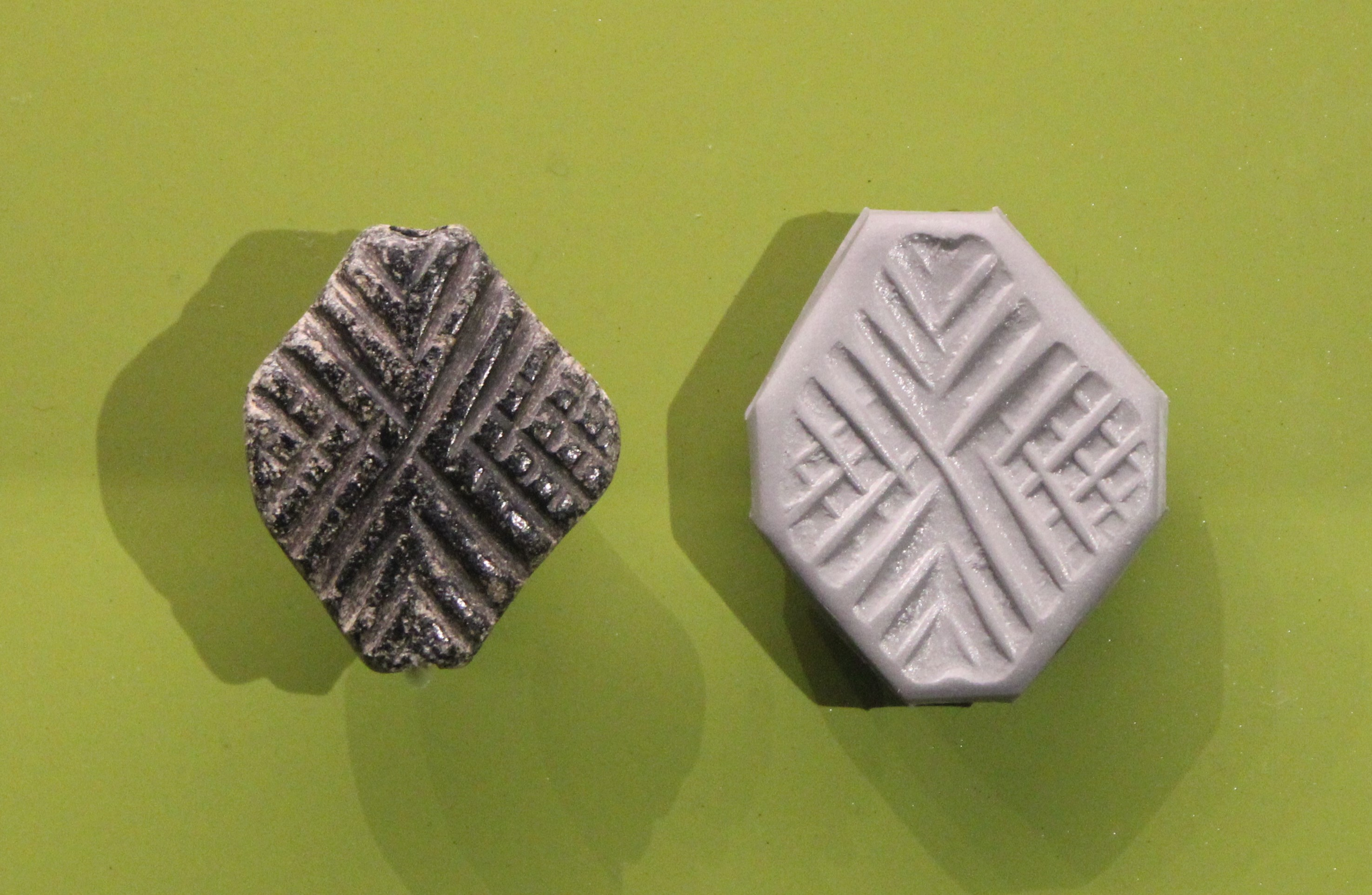
Stamp-seal from Tell Brak.

According to the excavators the site included two temple complexes (the Upper Temple and the Lower Temple) with food storage controlled by the temples. Other researchers have instead interpreted the site as a densely populated settlement with large food storage facilities without a religious component.

Some clay sealings were recovered during the excavations. A 3rd millennium BC kiln was also found. Finds included, in the Early Dynastic layer, several terracotta andirons, used to support vessels over a fire, similar to those found in a Ninevite 5 period context at Tell Brak. Small finds included 27 bronze pins, thousands of beads, 16 bone rings, flat figurines, anthropomorphic figurines, and a 2.3 centimeter by 1.1 centimeter by 0.6 centimeter crescent shaped bone object interpreted as belonging to a musical instrument.

=== Tell Hazna II ===
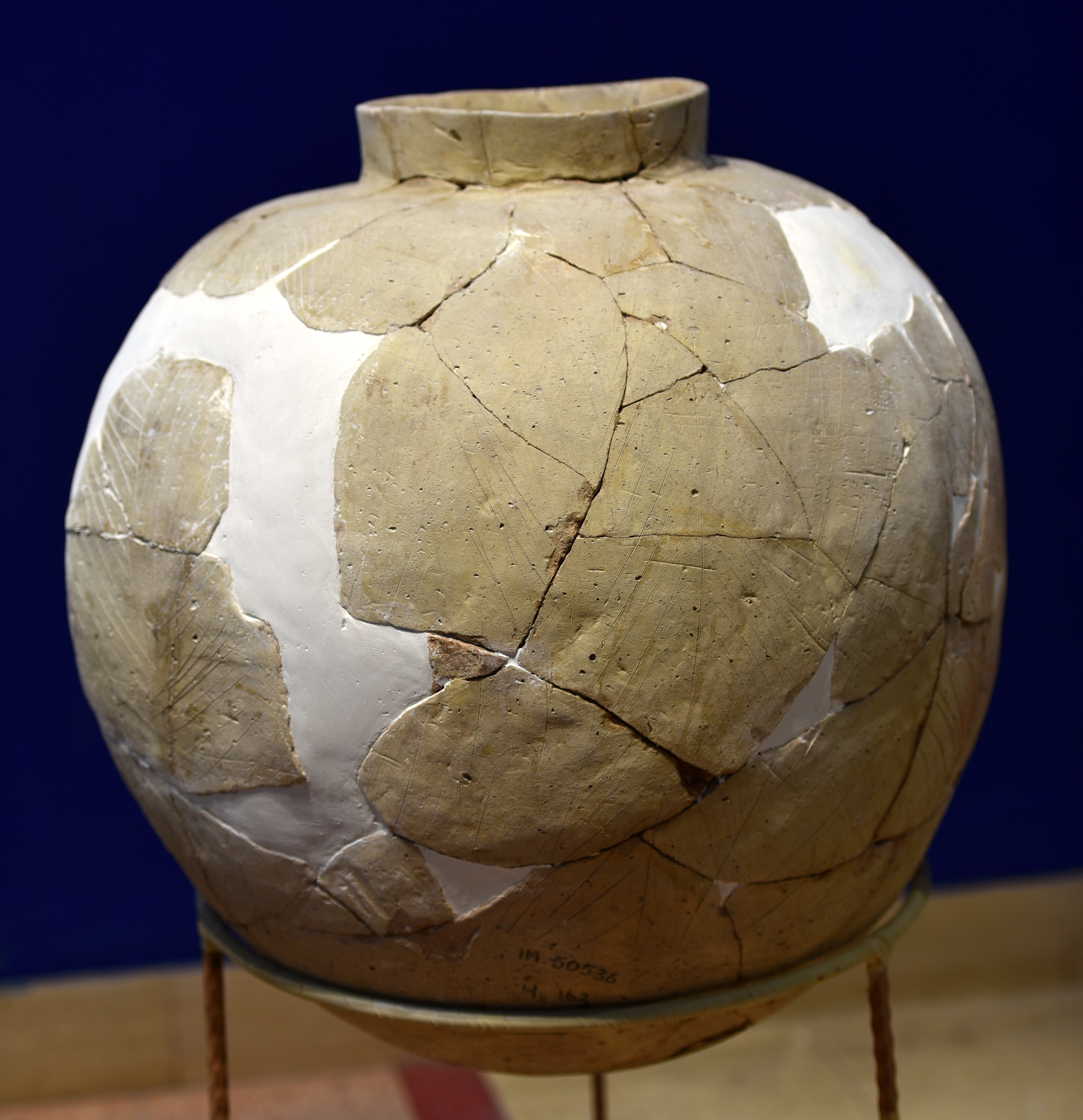
Large pottery jar. Hassuna culture, incised type. Tell Hassuna, Iraq. 6th millennium BC

The site lies about 1 kilometer south of Tell Hazna I, on the bank of the wadi Khanzir (tributary of the Jaghjagh River) and was excavated by the Russian Academy of Sciences beginning in 1988 and extending into the 1990s. It is between 100 meters and 150 meters in diameter and rises about 10 meters above the plain. In 1991 a trench with an area of 15 meters by 2.5 meters was excavated on the east slope to a depth which varied from 3.18 meters to 8.80 meters. The lowest 3 meters dated to the Hassuna culture and included a one year old infant burial (in a large vessel). Grave goods in the burial included over 200 copper, stone, and shell beads. Based on radiocarbon dating (method and calibration unknown) the site dates to the first half of the 6th millennium BC while dendrochronology points to a date in the late 7th millennium BC.

== See also ==
- Chagar Bazar
- Cities of the Ancient Near East
- Tell Arbid
- Tell Barri
- Tell Brak
- Tell Mozan
