= Hamoukar =

Archaeological site in Syria

- Khirbat al-Fakhar
- Location within Syria
- 36°48′55″N 41°57′21″E
- Location: Syria
- Region: Al Hasakah Governorate

History
- Built: around 4500 BC
- Abandoned: around 1200 BC

Site notes
- Area: 105–300 ha (260–740 acres)
- Excavation dates: 1999 to 2010
- Archaeologists: Clemens D. Reichel, McGuire Gibson

Hamoukar (Arabic: حموكار, known locally as Khirbat al-Fakhar) is a large archaeological site located in the Jazira region of northeastern Syria (Al Hasakah Governorate), near the Iraqi and Turkish borders. The early settlement dates back to the 5th millennium BCE, and it existed simultaneously with the Ubaid and the early Uruk cultures. It was a major center of obsidian production. In the 3rd millennium, this was one of the largest cities of Northern Mesopotamia, and extended to 105 ha.

== History ==
The origin of urban settlements has generally been attributed to the riverine societies of southern Mesopotamia (in what is now southern Iraq). This is the area of ancient Sumer, where around 4000 BC the Mesopotamian cities Ur and Uruk emerged. In 2007, following the discoveries at Hamoukar, some archaeologists have argued that the Cradle of Civilization could have extended further up the Tigris River and included the part of northern Syria where Hamoukar is located.

In the Late Chalcolithic 2 period (5th millennium BC) the site sustained a seasonal or dispersed occupation covering about 280 hectares. As an urban center Tell Hamoukar was first occupied in the early 4th millennium BC and experienced major growth in the middle of the 3rd millennium BC through the Uruk period. Occupation, at a lesser scale, continued through the Ninevite 5 period in the first half of the 2nd millennium and thereafter and the site was abandoned at the end of that millennium.

Other contemporary early sites in this area are Chagar Bazar, Tell Arbid, and the multi-period site of Tell Brak.

== Archaeology ==
The site has a 15 hectare mound (peaking at 18 meters above the plain and first settled in the early 4th millennium BC) and a 5 meter high lower town on three sides which was occupied beginning in the middle 3rd millennium BC and brought the site up to its maximum of 98 hectares. There are three named sub-mounds in the site, Tell al-Sara, Tell al-Duwaym, and Tell al-Tamr, with Tell Mas’ada lying just outside the site boundary. The southern extension of the mound is also known as Khirbet al-Fakhar. Archaeology dates this area to the middle 5th millennium BC though radiocarbon dates point to the late 5th millennium BC. About 40 hectares of the site are covered by the modern village of al-Hurriya including paved roads and mudbrick homes.

The site was first examined and described by Van Liere and Lauffray in the 1950s noting a two stepped plateau with a ditch 100 meters from the foot of the mound. A scaled plan, based on aerial photographs, was published in 1963 which estimated the mound area at 116 hectares and the area within the circular depression as 216 hectares. Due to this large size Van Liere proposed it as the location of Washshukanni. Excavation by a joint Syrian-American expedition (by the Oriental Institute of the University of Chicago and the Syrian Directorate General of Antiquities) was conducted beginning in 1999 and ending in 2010. Initial work in 1999 included an intensive surface survey based on 10 meter by 10 meter squares. The excavation was initially led by McGuire Gibson and later by Clemens D. Reichel. The site was abandoned at the end of the 3rd millennium BC. During the 2001 excavations a 400 square meter trench opened in the residential area of the lower town found that it was prosperous and had been sacked and abandoned at that time.

Thousands of clay sealings have been found on the site, indicating the existence of a complex bureaucratic system. These sealings were once used to protect doors or containers from tampering and were impressed with stamp seals. Artifacts from Hamoukar can be seen at the Oriental Institute. Eye Idols made of alabaster or bone have been found in Tell Hamoukar. Similar Eye Idols from the same period have also been found in Tell Brak, the biggest settlement from Syria's Late Chalcolithic period.

== Obsidian ==
Obsidian fragments were found across a 280 hectare area with obsidian workshops located in a section of the lower town, indicating the existence of the obsidian production facilities of both weapons and tools. They were in use at least as early as several centuries before the destruction of the 3rd millennium BC city in c. 3500 BC. The volcanic rock of this type does not occur in Hamoukar area, so it must have been imported. The nearest deposits are located in the area of Mount Nemrut (today's Turkey), about 170 km north of the city. This is confirmed by chemical analysis of the obsidian.

The findings were a surprise for many archaeologists, since they indicate the existence of independent trading networks in the northern Mesopotamia outside of the influence of southern cities, such as Ur and Uruk.

== Proto-urban settlement ==
Considerable social complexity had developed in northern Mesopotamia during the LC1-2 periods (4400-3800 BC), involving also the metalwork and ceramic styles. The early urban settlement of Hamoukar (Khirbat al-Fakhar) at this time has been described as "a vast low or flat scatter of pottery and obsidian". The population density was very low at that stage, so this was more like the scattering of various small sites in the same area. The same description also applies to the earliest settlement of Tell Brak:

... new indicators of social complexity appeared simultaneously with dramatic settlement expansion at Brak and Khirbat al-Fakhar, although not in the form known from later periods of northern Mesopotamian history. Both were extensive “proto-urban” settlements of low or variable density, with few other parallels elsewhere in the Near East.

During these Late Chalcolithic 1 and 2 periods (LC1-2), Khirbat al-Fakhar already reached a massive size of 300 ha, or larger than Uruk itself at the same time.

== Earliest urban warfare ==
Excavation work undertaken in 2005 and 2006 showed that Hamoukar was destroyed around 3500 BC. This may be the evidence of the earliest urban warfare attested so far in the archaeological record of the Near East. Slings and thousands of clay bullets have been found, indicating a siege, along with widespread signs of destruction. The force responsible for the destruction is uncertain though the city may have fallen victim to the Uruk expansion from the south as the next occupation layer is of the Uruk civilization. Contained excavations in 2008 and 2010 tried to expand on that.

== See also ==
- Cities of the Ancient Near East
