= Tell Arbid =

Archaeological site in Syria

- Location within Syria
- 36°52′20.51″N 41°1′17.61″E
- Type: settlement
- Periods: Bronze Age
- Location: Al-Hasakah Governorate, Syria

History
- Built: 3rd millennium BC

Site notes
- Excavation dates: 1934–1936, 1996–2010
- Archaeologists: M.E.L. Mallowan, Piotr Bieliński, Ahmad Serriyeh, Rafał Koliński
- Condition: Ruined
- Owner: Public
- Public access: Yes

Tell Arbid is an ancient Near East archaeological site in the Khabur River Basin region of Al-Hasakah Governorate, Syria, about 50 kilometers north northeast of modern Al-Hasakah. It is located 45 kilometers south of Tell Mozan, the site of ancient Urkesh and about 15 kilometers from the site of Chagar Bazar. The Halafian site of Tell Arbid Abyad is a short distance away.

== History ==
The site was heavily occupied in the 3rd Millennium BC during the Early Dynastic period that started c. 2900 BC, primarily during Ninevite 5 (2900-2600 BC). In northern Mesopotamia this is equivalent to the Early Jezirah I–II period. The ruins of an extensive city dated to the Ninevite 5 period cover almost the entire site. It was located between the largest centers of the region in the 3rd millennium BC: Tell Brak (ancient Nagar) and Tell Mozan (ancient Urkish). Other contemporary sites in this area of Khabur River basin are Hamoukar and Chagar Bazar. The site was occupied only sporadically in the Akkadian, Mitanni, Neo-Babylonian and the Hellenistic period.

== Archaeology ==
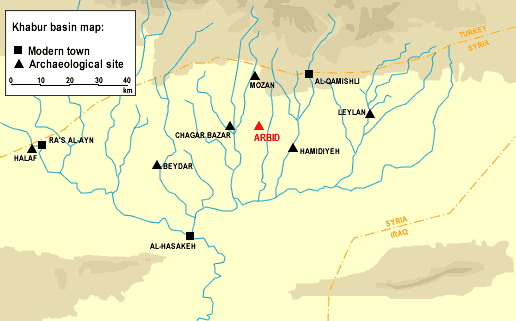
Tell Arbid

The site consists of a large main tell and four smaller mounds, together covering about 38 hectares with a height of around 30 meters. The main tell (with an area if around 12 hectares) consists primarily of Mittanni, Akkadian, Early Dynastic, and Ninevite 5 layers with the latter two including monumental buildings.

The initial excavation of Tell Arbid was performed by a British Museum team led by M.E.L. Mallowan, opening 8 trenches and investigating a number of graves. The operation ran from 1934 to 1936. Items collected, including a Halafian duck bead and Uruk period pottery sherds, during the excavations ended up in the British Museum, the Institute of Archaeology Collections at University College London, the Ashmolean Museum in Oxford, and at the National Museum of Aleppo in Syria (325 of which were later moved to a museum in Deir ez-Zor). A survey was done at the site in the 1990s by Bertille Lyonnet of the Centre National de Recherches Scientifiques in Paris.

For 15 seasons beginning in 1996 the site was excavated by a Polish-Syrian team led by Piotr Bieliński from the Polish Centre of Mediterranean Archaeology University of Warsaw and Dr. Ahmad Serriyeh from Damascus University. This work has continued through the 2010 season. During 2000 they were assisted by a joint American/Austrian team from the Oriental Institute of the University of Vienna and Archeos Inc led by Gebhard Selz and David Nelson Gimbel which focused on the North slope. From 2008 to 2010 a team led by Rafal Kolinski excavated a cemetery area on the Eastern slope of the site. In the cemetery, dating from Middle Bronze II, a skeleton was found showing hallmarks from a lifetime of grain grinding labor.

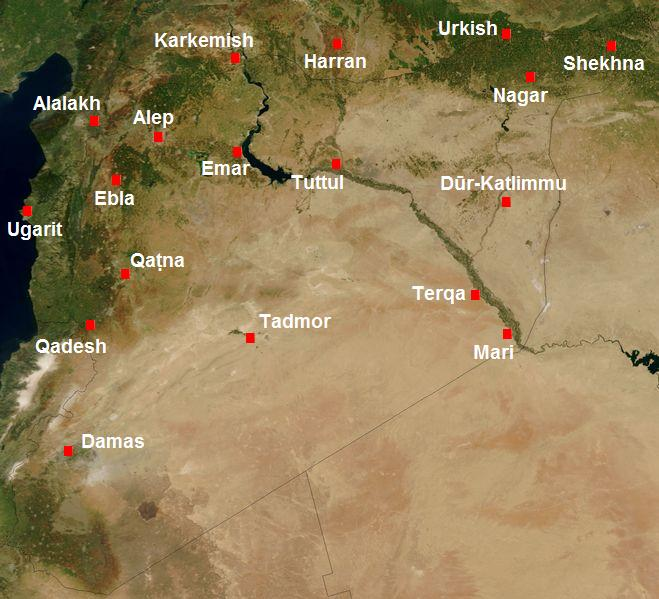
Map of Syria in the second millennium BC

The most important features include a Ninevite 5 temple (the so-called Southern Temple) with a ramp leading to it, uncovered in 2008. Another sacral building, the so-called Southwestern Temple, was found on the western side of the tell. The excavators also identified graves from different periods – Ninevite 5 culture, Khabur culture (1950–1500 BC), and two richly-furnished women's graves from the Mitanni period (1500–1300 BC) One of the graves was of a high status individual and contained numerous pottery, bronze and gold grave goods as well as two cylinder seals and two faience scarabs.

The city was in its heyday in the first half of the 3rd millennium BC. Residential and economic quarters, as well as official and sacral buildings, date to this period. The finds from the Akkadian period are fewer and include whole vessels and architectural remains. Traces of settlement dating to the beginning of the 2nd millennium BC were found only in some parts of the site. The Mitanni-period layers yielded residential houses and graves. After a settlement hiatus, which lasted until the Neo-Babylonian period, domestic structures reappeared; finds from this period include cylinder seals. The excavators also discovered the remains of a caravanserai from the 3rd millennium BC.

The excavations at Tell Arbid yielded a rich assemblage of 577 zoomorphic and 67 anthropomorphic clay figurines, dated to the 3rd and 2nd millennium BC. The 3rd millennium figures, about 40 in number, are smaller and more crudely made and fired compared to the later figures, from the Khabur Ware period. Stone beads (made of carnelian and lapis lazuli, among others), cylinder seals, and stone tools were also found. An interesting group of objects consists of 40 terracotta chariot models, preserved whole or in fragments, dating from the Ninevite 5 culture to the Khabur culture.

== See also ==
- Cities of the ancient Near East
