= Mara-Il =

Mara-Il is the only king of Nagar (Tell Brak) known by name, and the first known historical figure from the Jezirah region. He can be dated to the Early Jezirah IIIb Palace Archive (i.e. Early Bronze IIIB, between 2500-2350 BC). Most of the texts record the ruler of Nagar using his title "En", without mentioning a name. Only in Ebla was a name mentioned: Mara-Il; he ruled a little more than a generation before Nagar's destruction c. 2300 BC, and was most probably the "En" recorded in other texts, including the ones from Nabada. At this time the main city-states were Ebla to the west and Mari to the south. In times of war between Ebla and Mari, Ebla was allied with Nagar circumventing trade through northern mesopotamia instead of the blocked Euphrates valley.

== Amar-AN ==
An inscription from Mari records a certain Amar-AN of the land of Nagar, (Note: Amar-AN son of Ur-^{d}UTU.ŠA.) and he could be identical to Mara-Il (whose name in Ebla was written ma-ra-AN). (Note: AN was a cuneiform sign that designate the word for "god", which is "il" for Semites) Four scholars, Marco Bonechi, Amalia Catagnoti, Maria Vittoria Tonietti and Walther Sallaberger, suggested a tentative relation between the element Amar and the element Ma-ra but both Catagnoti and Tonietti admit to the difficulty of this identification and have reservations.
