= Bracks =

Bracks is a surname. Notable people with the surname include:

- Kate Bracks (born 1974), Australian reality television cook
- Nick Bracks (born 1987), Australian male model, fashion designer and TV personality
- Steve Bracks (born 1954), former Australian politician and the 44th Premier of Victoria
  - Bracks Ministry, 65th ministry of the Government of Victoria led by the Premier of Victoria, Steve Bracks, and Deputy Premier, John Thwaites.

== See also ==
- Brack (disambiguation)
- Brack (surname)
