= Deir ez-Zor Museum =

Museum in Deir ez-Zor, Syria

Deir ez-Zor Museum متحف دير الزور
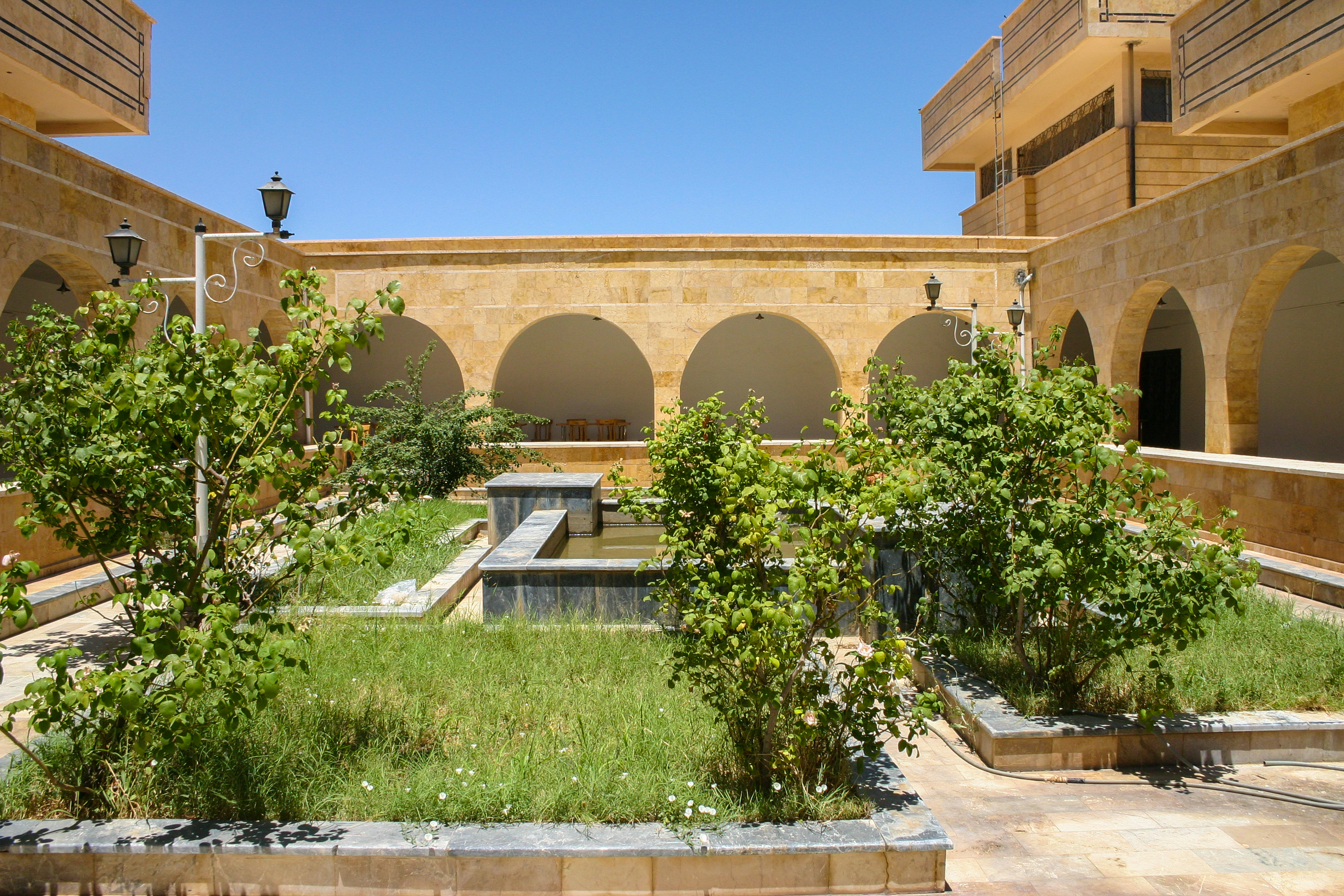
- Courtyard of the Deir ez-Zor Museum

- Location in Syria
- Established: 1974
- Location: Deir ez-Zor, Syria
- Coordinates: 35.341°N 40.133°E
- Type: Historical, Archaeological

The Deir ez-Zor Museum (Arabic: متحف دير الزور) is a museum devoted to the archaeology and history of northeastern Syria, an area more commonly known as the Jezirah, or Upper Mesopotamia. The museum is located in Deir ez-Zor, the capital of Deir ez-Zor Governorate, Syria. It was founded in 1974 and housed in a gallery of a shopping mall. Between 1983 and 1996, it was located in an old law court built in 1930. In 1996, the museum moved to its current location in a building that had been especially designed for the museum. The exhibition halls cover an area of 1,600 square metres (17,000 sq ft) and are arranged around a courtyard. The construction of the new museum was a joint Syrian–German operation.

When the museum was founded in 1974, its collection consisted of only 140 objects, donated by the National Museum of Damascus and the National Museum of Aleppo. The current collection consists of some 25,000 objects, including the majority of the clay tablets found at Mari. The museum also holds many objects found by international teams of archaeologists at sites in the Upper Khabur area, such as Tell Beydar, Tell Brak, Tell Leilan and Tell Mozan. The Euphrates Valley southeast of Deir ez-Zor is represented with objects from the Classical site of Dura-Europos, which was once a border city of the Roman Empire.

The collection is organized around five chronological themes: prehistory, ancient Syria (late fourth to first millennium BCE), the Classical period, the Islamic era and ethnography. It includes a number of life-size reconstructions of buildings from different periods, including a house from the Pre-Pottery Neolithic B site of Bouqras in the Euphrates Valley, an Early Bronze Age city-gate from Tell Bderi on the Khabur River, the southern façade with wall paintings of the "Court of the Palms" of Zimri-Lim's palace in Mari and the gate of the Islamic Qasr al-Heer al-Sharqi.

In 2015, the collection was allegedly removed from the museum by the Syrian Army in view of increased ISIS encroachments in Deir ez-Zor.

== See also ==
- List of museums in Syria
