= Tell Beydar =

Archaeological site in Syria

- Location within Syria
- 36°44′16″N 40°35′13″E
- Type: Settlement
- Location: Al-Hasakah Governorate, Syria

History
- Built: 2600 BC

Site notes
- Excavation dates: 1992–2010
- Archaeologists: Marc Lebeau, Antoine Suleiman
- Condition: In ruins

Tell Beydar (ancient Nabada, also Tall Beydar and Tell Baydar) is an Ancient Near Eastern archaeological site along the Khabur river in the modern Al-Hasakah Governorate, Syria about 30 kilometers north of the modern city of Hasake. It is connected by road to Al-Darbasiyah on the Turkish border in the north. In the mid-third millennium BC it was the city of Nabada which was a provincial center under the city of Nagar (Tell Brak). It is known to have contained 5 large temples (labeled A-E) in the city center (covering 16.5% of the area there) in that period. While it is not known with certainty what deities were worshiped in these temples, the god Šumugan has been suggested as one of them. In recent years domestic construction has been encroaching at the site.

== History ==
Nabada was first settled during the Early Dynastic I Period circa 2800 BC. By around 2600 BC a medium-sized independent city-state had developed. At that point (c. 2450 BC), it became a provincial capital under the kingdom centered at Nagar, now Tell Brak and reached its maximum size. After the Jezirah region was conquered by the Akkadian Empire, Nabada became an minor outpost of that empire. Radiocarbon dates for that transition ranged from 2420 BC to 2270 BC ± 10. The city was then abandoned until re-occupied for a time circa 1400 BC by the Hurrians (Mitanni) and again in the Neo-Assyrian and Hellenistic periods.

== Archaeology ==
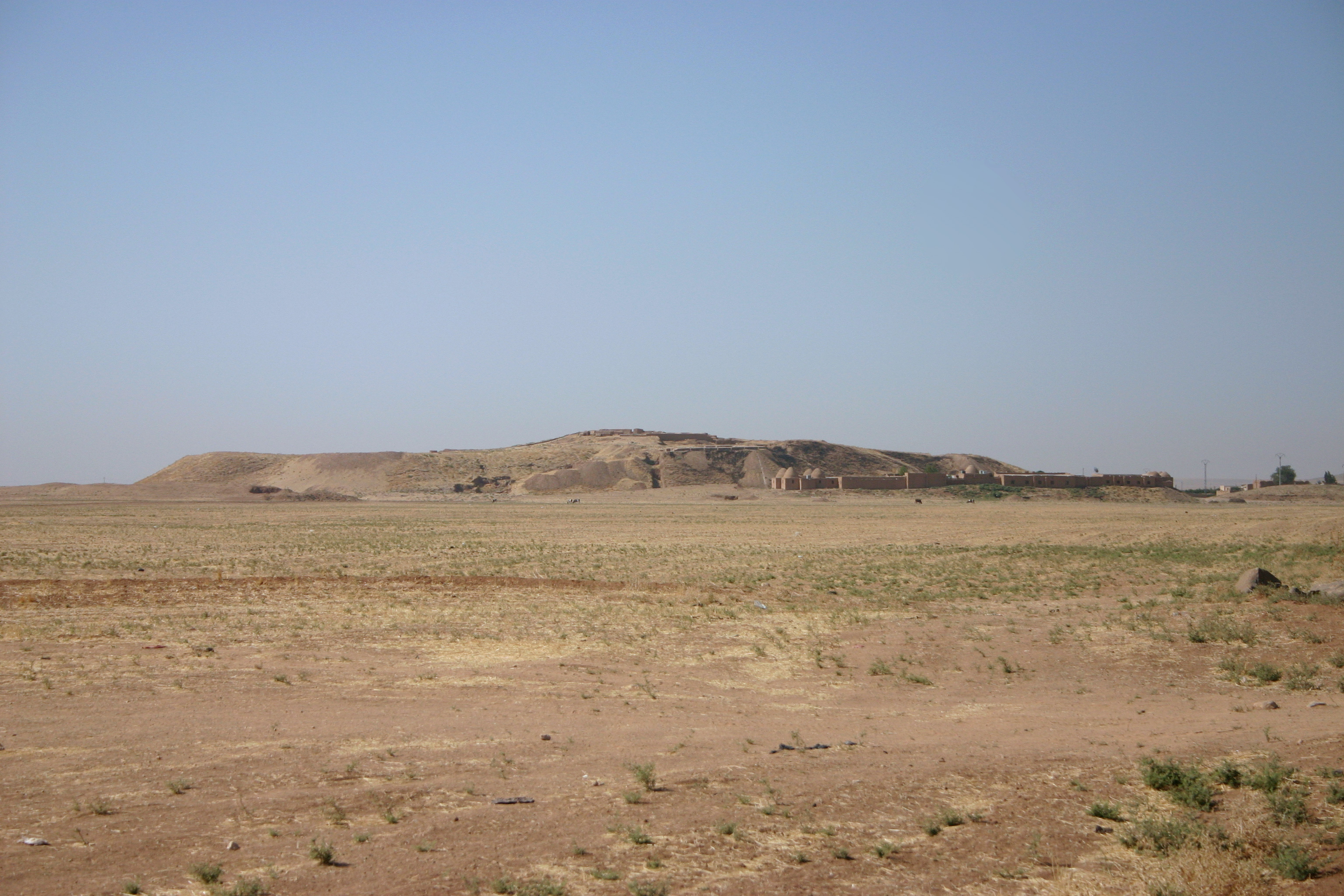
Beydar 1

The site was first noted, and photographed, in 1929 by Antoine Poidebard during his aerial survey of the region. The central site of Tell Beydar covers about 22 hectares and has a height of about 27.5 meters above the plain. It has a circular walled central mound (7 hectares) with a circular walled lower town (Beydar I). This is referred to as a Kranzhügel or "cup-and-saucer" tell in archaeology. The inner wall has a diameter of 300 meters and the outer one a diameter of 600 meters. The outer wall was 5 meters thick and had four gates. In the early part of the 3rd millennium BC both sections were occupied but from the middle of the millennium on only the central mound was occupied. A much later 50 ha (120-acre) Hurrian and Neo-Assyrian occupation lies at the base of the tell (Beydar II). At the top of the tell there is a Hellenistic settlement. A kilometer to the south there is a small Late Chalcolithic tell (Beydar III). The top of the mound, which has around 20 meters of occupation remains, during the Early Dynastic period held a 50 meter by 60 meter white baked brick palace with 50 rooms with plastered wall and a large central courtyard. This ED IIIb palace used surviving portions of the original 18 room ED II palace. About 20 tombs at the site, some high status, were excavated. Grave goods varied depending on social status and included weapons (in one case a bronze ax), jewelry and pottery.

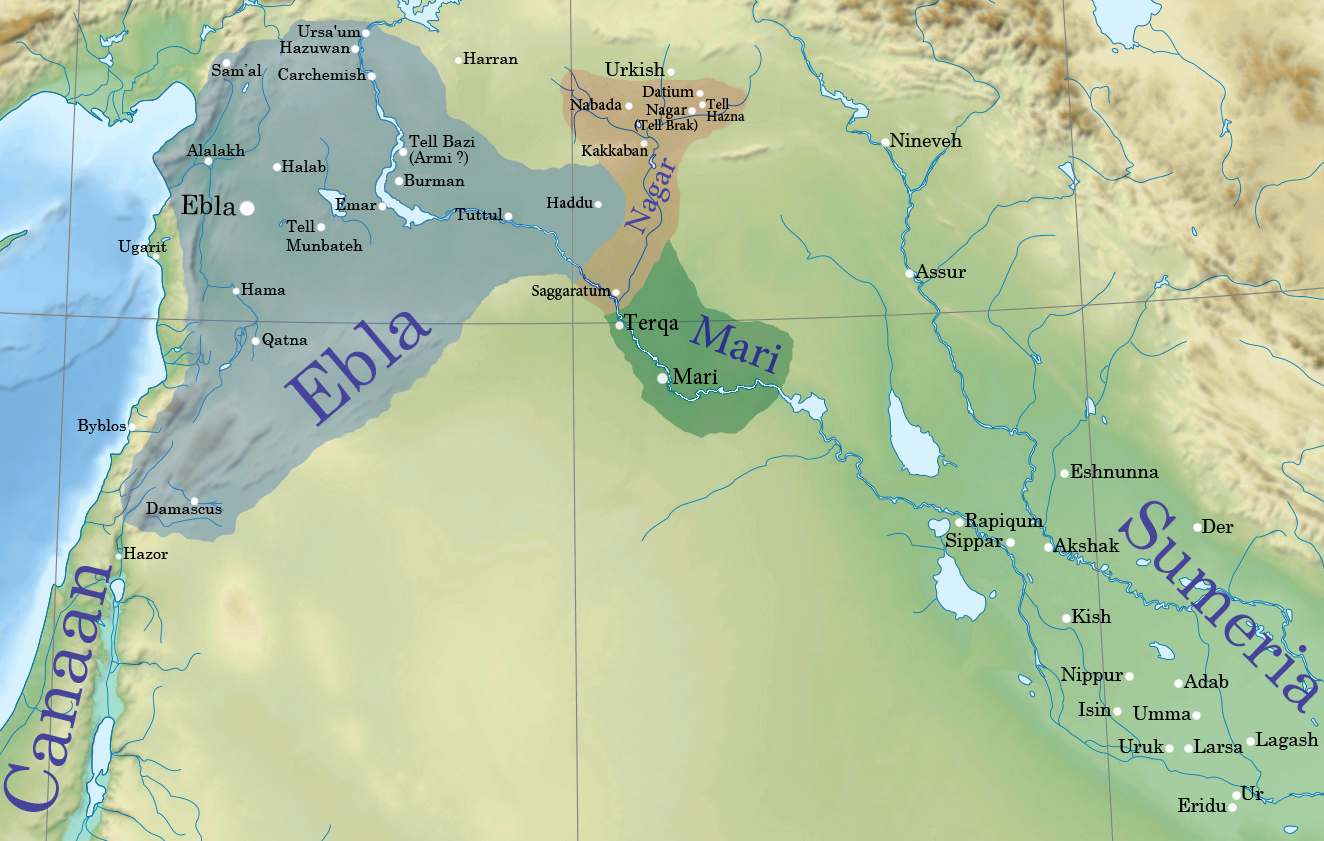
First Eblaite Empire

Tell Beydar was excavated for 17 seasons, beginning in 1992 and ending in 2010, by a joint Syrian and European team made up of the European Centre for Upper Mesopotamian Studies and the Directorate-General of Antiquities and Museums of Syria. There were also several restoration seasons. The team leads are Marc Lebeau and Antoine Suleiman. In 1997 and 1998 the Oriental Institute of the University of Chicago performed an archaeological survey of the area in a 12 kilometer radius around Tell Beydar. This was later augmented by satellite imagery. University of Venice excavated at the north-eastern slope of the 3rd millennium inner city, just inside the inner town wall at a city gate.

Besides the architectural and pottery findings from the excavation, almost 250 early cuneiform tablets and fragments were recovered, dating from the Early Dynastic III period, roughly a generation before the fall of Ebla. About 220 tablets, found out of context, belong to a single archive. The tablets are agricultural records for the most part, but do establish some synchronisms with Tell Brak. A typical tablet reads "Sheep for plucking: The rams of Lushalim: one hundred; the ewes: one hundred and 85 (L e. 60+20-+5); 3 he-goats: the pastured lambs: 43. Month of the Sun-god.". The language used in the tablets is a variant of the Akkadian language and the personal names referred to were Semitic. Small finds include a number of bronze (both tin and arsenical) objects. Over 1500 sealings, representing 215 different designs, were also recovered. Finds from Tell Beydar are on display in the Deir ez-Zor Museum.

As a result of the excavation a stratigraphy has been established for the site:

- I - Early Dynastic I, Kranzhügel period, 2900-2750 BC
- II - Early Dynastic II, area of 22 hectares, 2750-2560 BC
- IIIa - Early Dynastic III, lower town abandoned, are reduced to 7 hectares, 2560-2430 BC
- IIIb - Early Dynastic III, part of Kingdom of Nagar, 2430-2340 BC
- IV - Proto-Imperial, Akkadian Empire, Post Akkad, 2340-2100 BC
- Occupational hiatus
- Mittani occupation, c. 1400 BC
- Occupational hiatus
- Neo-Assyrian occupation, c 700 BC
- Occupational hiatus
- Hellenistic occupation, c. c. 200 BC
- Abandonment of site

== See also ==
- Cities of the ancient Near East
- List of Mesopotamian deities
- List of Mesopotamian dynasties
- Tell Chuera
