= Tell Brak Head =

Prehistoric sculpture found at Tell Brak in Syria

- Material: Gypsum
- Size: 17 cm high
- Created: 3500–3300 BC
- Present location: British Museum, London
- Registration: ME 126460

The Tell Brak Head is an important prehistoric Middle Eastern sculpture found at the ancient site of Tell Brak in Syria. It has been part of the British Museum's collection since 1939. Dated by archaeologists to before 3300 BC, it is considered to be one of the oldest portrait busts from the Middle East.

== Discovery ==
The sculpture was discovered during excavations in the late 1930s carried out by the eminent British archaeologist Sir Max Mallowan at Tell Brak, north eastern Syria. It was found in the so-called Eye Temple, where a large number of offerings to the gods had accumulated over time. The temple, built around 3500–3300 BC, was named for the hundreds of small alabaster eye idol figurines, which were incorporated into the mortar with which the mud-brick temple was constructed. Many of the more important idols had been robbed in antiquity, but this stone head was uncovered inside a tunnel underneath the remains of earlier temples, that had been used by robbers in ancient times.

== Description ==
The Tell Brak Head is carved from gypsum (it was also previously described as alabaster) and appears to wear a head-dress. The face is elongated with large almond shaped eyes, circular ears and a small, smiling mouth. It has been difficult to determine whether the figure represents a deity or worshipper. A thin vertical depression at the back of the head, with holes either side for nails, suggests that it was once fixed to a pole and used during religious ceremonies. No other similar sculptures were found at the site, and there are few other representations comparable to the head from this period in the region.

== Current state ==
The statue is currently not on display at the museum, as it is undergoing treatment to retouch the chip/abasion to the back of the head.
