= Kish civilization =

Proposed Mesopotamia civilization

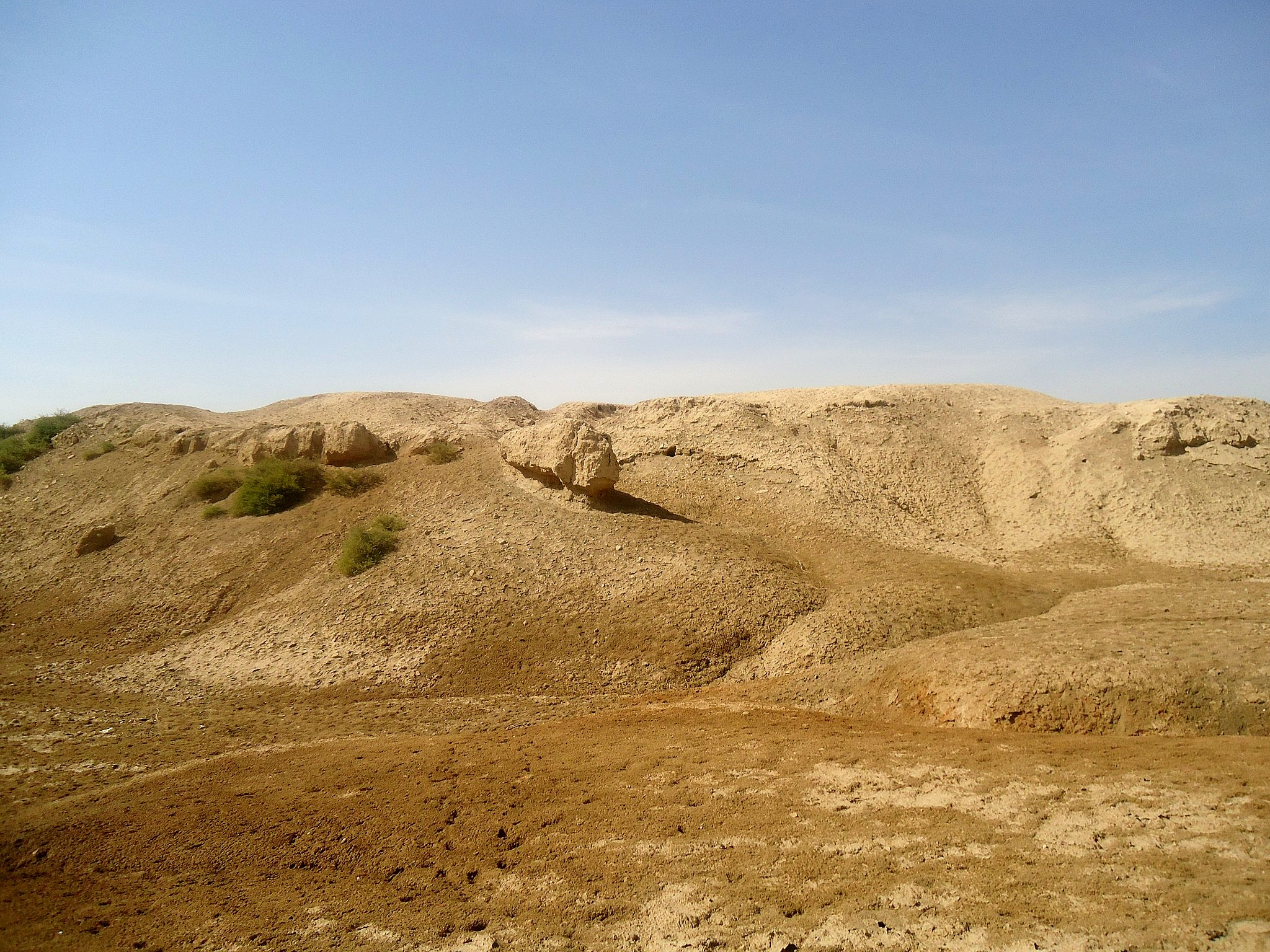
An ancient mound at the city of Kish, Mesopotamia, Babel Governorate, Iraq

The Kish civilization was a civilization that was proposed in earlier theories among Ancient Near East scholars, which encompassed the sites of Ebla and Mari in the Levant, Nagar in the north, and the proto-Akkadian sites of Abu Salabikh and Kish in central Mesopotamia into the early East Semitic era in Mesopotamia and the Levant. The term itself was coined by Ignace Gelb. The epoch that this supposed civilization existed started from the early 4th millennium BC and ended with the rise of the Akkadian Empire. The theory has been discarded by more recent scholarship.

== Overview ==
According to the theory, the East Semitic population migrated from what is now the Levant and spread into Mesopotamia, and the new population could have contributed to the collapse of the Uruk period c. 3100 BC. This early East Semitic culture was characterized by linguistic, literary and orthographic similarities extending from Ebla in the west to Abu Salabikh in the East. The personal names from the Sumerian city of Kish showed an East Semitic nature and revealed that the city population had a strong Semitic component from the dawn of recorded history, and since Gelb considered Kish to be the center of this civilization, hence the naming.

The similarities included the use of a writing system that contained non-Sumerian logograms, the use of the same system in naming the months of the year, dating by regnal years and a similar measuring system. However, each city had its own monarchical system.

While the languages of Mari and Ebla were closely related, Kish represented an independent East Semitic linguistic entity that spoke a dialect (Kishite), different from both pre-Sargonic Akkadian and the Ebla-Mari language.

The theory has been rejected for a number of reasons: the linguistic, literary and cultural similarities and connections between the different parts of the alleged Kish civilization have been shown to be much smaller than Gelb thought, the alleged central role of the city of Kish remains unproven, and it has been argued that onomastic and other evidence suggests that Semitic speakers were still a small minority in Northern Babylonia during the period in question.

== See also ==
- History of institutions in Mesopotamia
