= Brack =

Brack may refer to:

== People ==
- Brack (surname)
- Brack Cantrell, a former member of the American post-hardcore band Sky Eats Airplane
- Brack Cornett (1841–1888), Texas outlaw

== Other uses ==
- The Brack, a mountain in the Arrochar Alps of Scotland
- Barmbrack, often shortened to brack, a yeast bread with added sultanas and raisins
- Brack., author abbreviation of William Brackenridge (1810–1893), Scottish nurseryman and botanist
- Brackenridge Hospital
- Brack (ship), a 17th century privateering yacht

== See also ==
- Brak (disambiguation)
- Bräcke, a municipality in Sweden
- BRAC Bank Limited, a commercial bank in Bangladesh
- Brackish water, naturally occurring water with high salinity, also known as brack water
