= Little Brak River =

Little Brak River may refer to:

- The Little Brak River (river), a river in the Western Cape province of South Africa
- Little Brak River (town), a town at the mouth of the river

== See also ==
- Great Brak River (disambiguation)
- Brak River
