= Tell Brak =

Archaeological site in Syria

- Nagar, Nawar
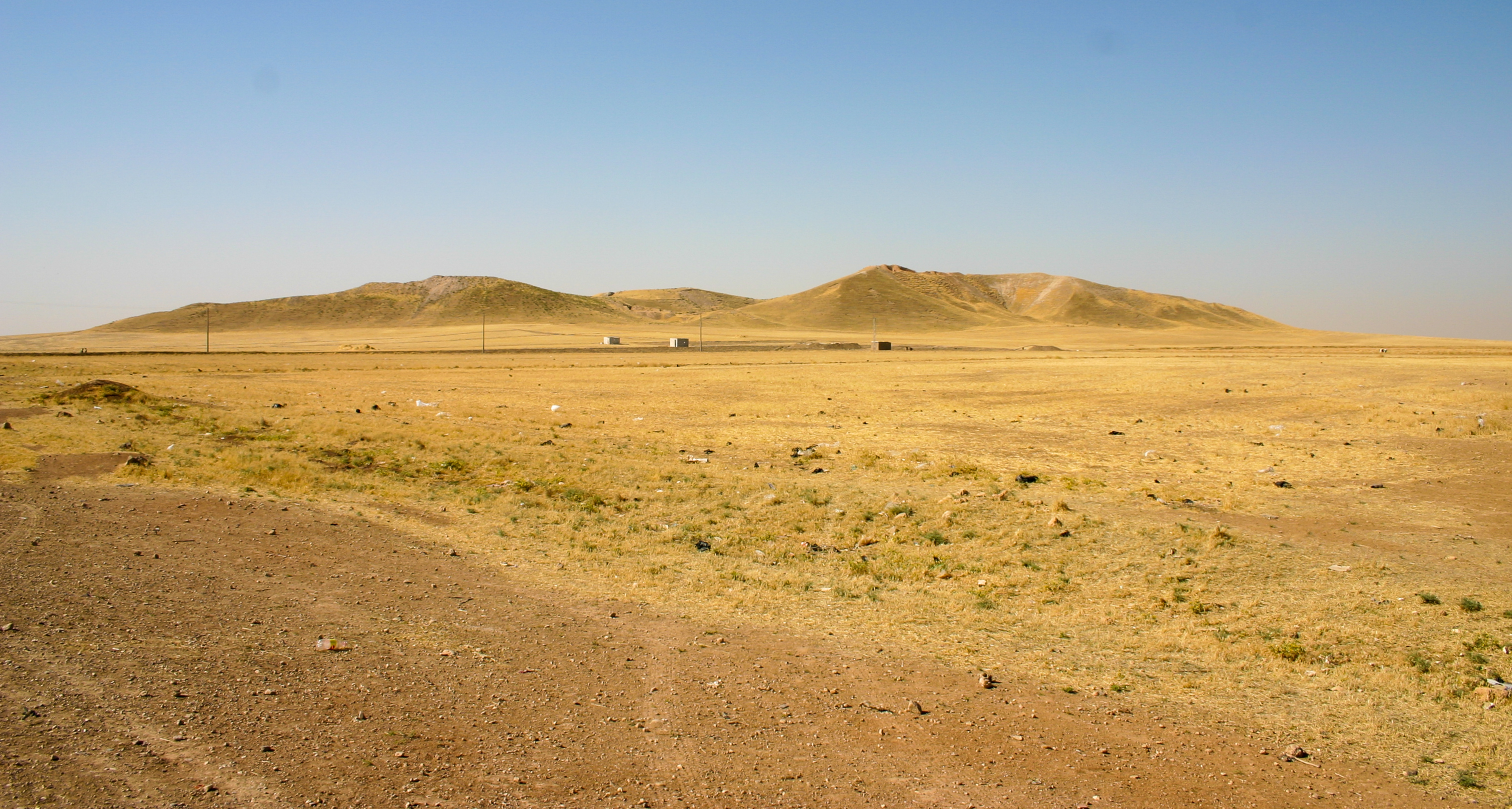
- Tell Brak as seen from a distance with several excavation areas visible

- Location within Near East Location within Syria
- 36°40′03.42″N 41°03′31.12″E
- Type: Settlement
- Periods: Neolithic, Bronze Age
- Cultures: Halaf culture, Northern Ubaid, Uruk, Kish civilization, Hurrian
- Location: Al-Hasakah Governorate, Syria

History
- Built: 6500 BC

Site notes
- Height: 40 metres (130 ft).
- Area: 60 hectares (150 acres).
- Excavation dates: 1937–1938, 1976–2011
- Archaeologists: Max Mallowan, David Oates, Joan Oates
- Public access: yes
- Website: tellbrak.mcdonald.cam.ac.uk

Tell Brak (Nagar, Nawar) was an ancient city in Syria; it is one of the earliest known cities in the world. Its remains constitute a tell located in the Upper Khabur region, near the modern village of Tell Brak, 50 kilometers north-east of Al-Hasaka city, Al-Hasakah Governorate. The city's original name is unknown. During the second half of the third millennium BC, the city was known as Nagar and later on, Nawar.

Starting as a small settlement in the seventh millennium BC, Tell Brak's urbanization began in the late 5th millennium BCE and evolved during the fourth millennium BC into one of the biggest cities in Upper Mesopotamia, and interacted with the cultures of southern Mesopotamia. The city shrank in size at the beginning of the third millennium BC with the end of Uruk period, before expanding again around 2600 BC, when it became known as Nagar, and was the capital of a regional kingdom that controlled the Khabur river valley. Nagar was destroyed around 2300 BC, and came under the rule of the Akkadian Empire, followed by a period of independence as a Hurrian city-state, before contracting at the beginning of the second millennium BC. Nagar prospered again by the 19th century BC, and came under the rule of different regional powers. In c. 1500 BC, Tell Brak was a center of Mitanni before being destroyed by Assyria around 1300 BC. The city never regained its former importance, remaining as a small settlement, and abandoned at some points of its history, until disappearing from records during the early Abbasid era.

Different peoples inhabited the city, including the Halafians, Semites and the Hurrians. Tell Brak was a religious center from its earliest periods; its famous Eye Temple is unique in the Fertile Crescent, and its main deity, Belet Nagar, was revered in the entire Khabur region, making the city a pilgrimage site. The culture of Tell Brak was defined by the different civilizations that inhabited it, and it was famous for its glyptic style, equids and glass. When independent, the city was ruled by a local assembly or by a monarch. Tell Brak was a trade center due to its location between Anatolia, the Levant and southern Mesopotamia. It was excavated by Max Mallowan in 1937, then regularly by different teams between 1979 and 2011, when the work stopped due to the Syrian Civil War.

== Name ==
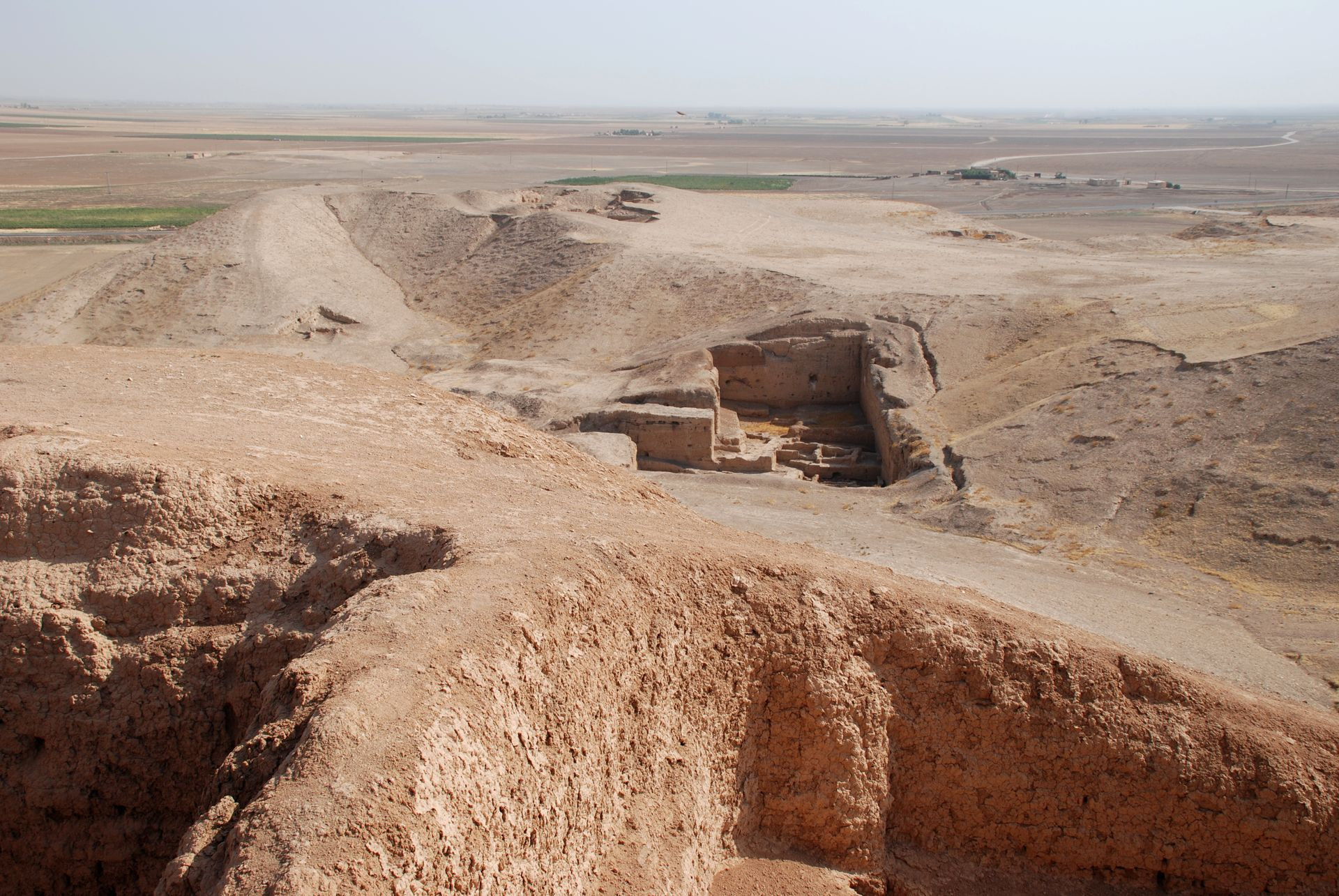
General view of Tell Brak

The original name of the city is unknown; Tell Brak is the current name of the tell. East of the mound lies a dried lake named "Khatuniah" which was recorded as "Lacus Beberaci" (the lake of Brak) in the Roman map Tabula Peutingeriana. The lake was probably named after Tell Brak which was the nearest camp in the area. The name "Brak" might therefore be an echo of the most ancient name.

Map of the Khabur Basin during the Bronze Age showing the location of Tell Brak and Urkesh (Tell Mozan)

During the third millennium BC, the city was known as "Nagar", which might be of Semitic origin and mean a "cultivated place". The name "Nagar" ceased occurring following the Old Babylonian period, however, the city continued to exist as Nawar, under the control of Hurrian state of Mitanni. Hurrian kings of Urkesh took the title "King of Urkesh and Nawar" in the third millennium BC.

=== Alternative theories ===
Although there is general view that the third millennium BC Nawar is identical with Nagar, some scholars, such as Jesper Eidem, doubt this. Those scholars opt for a city closer to Urkesh which was also called Nawala/Nabula as the intended Nawar.

== History ==
Dates (BC)	Brak period	Period designation in northern Mesopotamia
6500–5900	A	Proto-Hassuna/Pre-Halaf (Samarra-related)
5900–5200	B	Halaf
5200–4400	C	Northern Ubaid
4400–4200	D	Terminal Ubaid/Late Chalcolithic 1/LC1
4200–3900	E	Northern Early Uruk/Late Chalcolithic 2/LC2
3900–3600	F	Northern Middle Uruk/Late Chalcolithic 3/LC3
3600–3200	F	Northern Middle Uruk/Late Chalcolithic 4/LC4
3200–3000	G	Northern Middle Uruk/Late Chalcolithic 5/LC5
3000–2900	H	Post-Uruk
2900–2600	J	Ninevite 5
2600–2400	K	Ninevite 5
2400–2300	L	Post-Ninevite 5
2300–2100	M	Akkadian
2100–2000	N	Post-Akkadian
2000–1850	N	Middle Bronze I
1850–1500	P	Middle Bronze II/Khabur
1500–1275	Q	Mitanni
1275–900	R	Middle Assyrian
900–600	S	Neo-Assyrian/Iron II
600–330		Post-Assyrian
320–150		Seleuicid/Hellenistic
150–224	T	Parthian/Roman

=== Early settlement ===
In Brak Period A (c. 6500–5900 BC), the earliest small settlement is dated to the proto Halaf culture c. 6500 BC. Many objects dated to that period were discovered including the Halaf pottery.

In Brak Period B (c. 5900–5200 BC), the Halaf Culture Halaf culture transformed into Period C (c. 5200–4400 BC) Northern Ubaid, and many Ubaid materials were found in Tell Brak including coba bowls, diagnostic pottery for the Terminal Ubaid period. Excavations and surface survey of the site and its surroundings, unearthed a large platform of patzen bricks that dates to late Ubaid, (Note: Patzens are large rectangular bricks that come in different sizes.) and revealed that Tell Brak developed as an urban center slightly earlier than better known cities of southern Mesopotamia, such as Uruk.

=== Late Chalcolithic ===
==== The first city ====
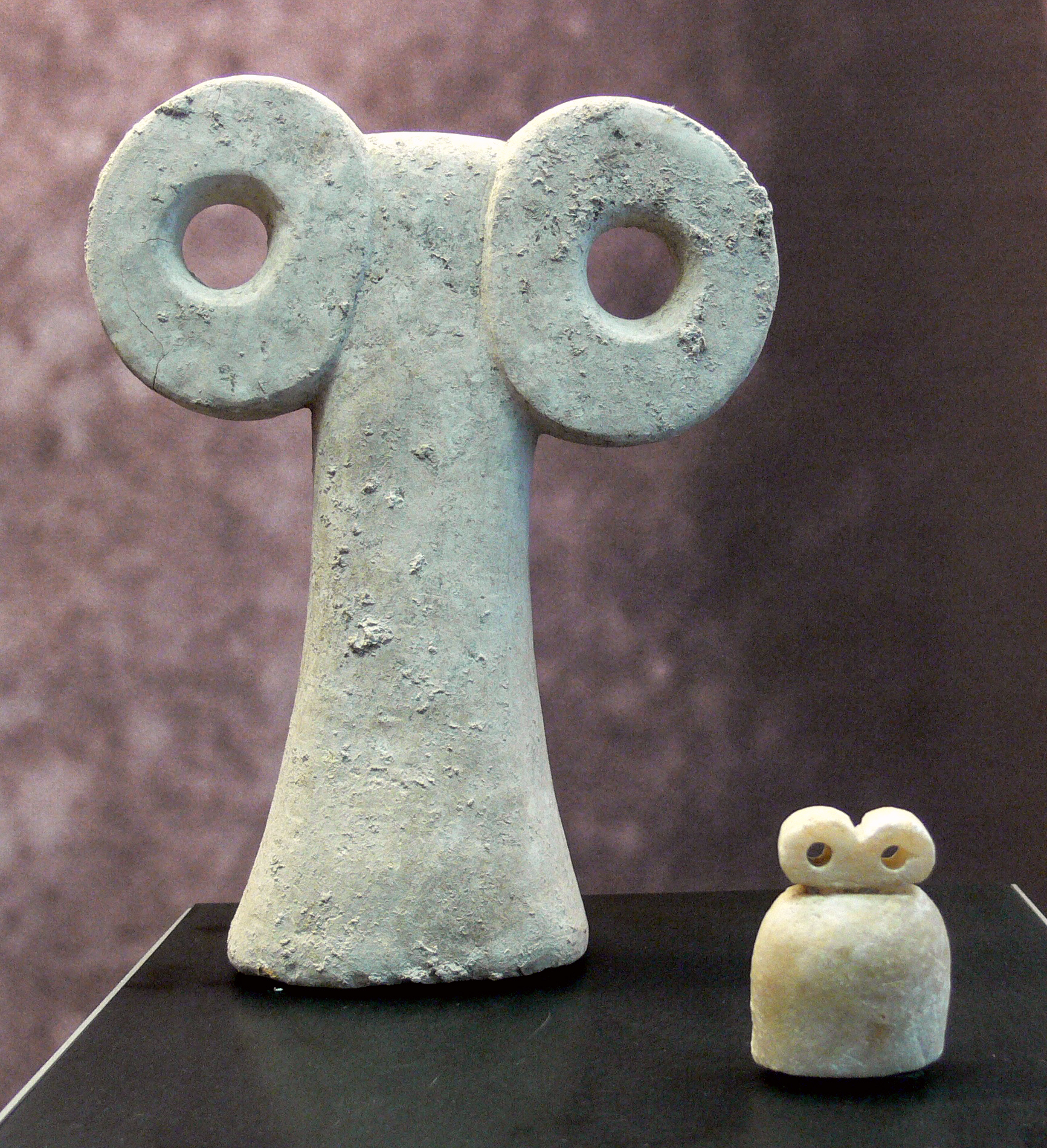
Eye figurines from the Eye Temple.

In southern Mesopotamia, the original Ubaid culture evolved into the Uruk period. The people of the southern Uruk period used military and commercial means to expand the civilization. In Northern Mesopotamia, the post Ubaid period is designated Late Chalcolithic / Northern Uruk period, during which, Tell Brak started to expand.

==== Brak Period E ====
Tell Brak Period E (c. 4200–3900 BC; Late Chalcolithic 2; Northern Early Uruk Period) witnessed the building of the City's Walls, and expansion beyond the mound to form a Lower Town, becoming a proto-urban city with a size of c. 55 hectares.

Comparison can be made with Hamoukar in LC1-2 period, where the early urban settlement has been described as "a vast low or flat scatter of pottery and obsidian". The population density at both settlements was very low at that stage, so they appeared more like a scattering of various small sites in the same area: "... new indicators of social complexity appeared simultaneously with dramatic settlement expansion at Brak and Khirbat al-Fakhar [Hamoukar], although not in the form known from later periods of northern Mesopotamian history. Both were extensive "proto-urban" settlements of low or variable density, with few other parallels elsewhere in the Near East." Another example is, Khirbat al-Fakhar already reached a massive size of 300 ha, or larger than the contemporary Uruk, itself.

Area TW of the tell (Archaeologists divided Tell Brak into areas designated with Alphabetic letters. See the map for Tell Brak's areas) revealed the remains of a monumental building with two meters thick walls and a basalt threshold. In front of the building, a sherd paved street was discovered, leading to the northern entrance of the city. Area TW covered an area of nearly 600 square meters up to a depth of 10 meters. A number of beveled rim bowls diagnostic of the Uruk period were found in the TW area.

==== Brak Period F ====
Tell Brak Period F can be subdivided into two phases early (c. 3800–3600 BC; Late Chaltolihic 3) and late (c. 3600–3000 BC; Late Chaltolihic 4).

In the Early Brak Period F (c. 3800–3600 BC; LC3), the early city-state continued to expand and reached the size of 130 hectares. Four mass graves, mainly sub-adults and young adults were discovered in the submound, Tell Majnuna, 600 meters north-east of the main mound (built entirely of rubbish over two centuries), and they suggest that the process of urbanization was accompanied by internal social stress, and an increase in the organization of warfare. The first half of period F (designated LC3), saw the erection of the Eye Temple, (Note: The temple have multiple levels, the earliest two are named the red and grey levels respectively, and they date to LC3. The third level (the white level) is dated to period LC5 (c. 3200–3000 BC), while the fourth and current visible one is named the "Latest Jemdet Nasr", and also dates to the late fourth millennium BC (LC5). Excavations revealed two rebuilding following the "Latest Jemdet Nasr" building, and they date to the Early Dynastic period I.) which was named for the thousands of small alabaster "Eye idols" and "Spectacle-topped idols" figurines discovered in it. (Note: Dated to the temple's grey level.) Those idols were also found in area TW.

In Late Brak Period F (c. 3600–3000 BC; LC4) interaction with Southern Mesopotamia increased, and an Urukean colony was established in the city. With the end of Uruk culture c 3000 BC, Tell Brak's Urukean colony was abandoned and deliberately leveled by its occupants.

==== Brak Period G & H ====
The Brak Period G (c. 3200–3000 BC; LC5), saw the site contracting during the following periods H and J, and became limited to the mound. In the Brak Period H (c. 3000–2900 BC; Post-Uruk), evidence exists for an interaction with the Mesopotamian south, represented by the existence of materials similar to the ones produced during the southern Jemdet Nasr period.

=== Early Bronze ===
==== Brak Period J & K ====
During the Brak Period J (2900–2600 BC) and K (2600–2400 BC) the city remained a small settlement during the Ninevite 5 period, with a small temple and associated sealing activities. (Note: The temple is located in area TC, adjacent to the so called "Brak Oval" building. It is dated to the Ninevite 5 period, period J c. 2700 BC. The temple consist of a single room with a mud brick altar, and contained a cache of over 500 sealings.)

==== Kingdom of Nagar ====
Around c. 2600 BC, a large administrative building was built and the city expanded out of the tell again. The revival is connected with the Kish civilization, and the city was named "Nagar". Amongst the important buildings dated to the kingdom, is an administrative building or temple named the "Brak Oval", located in area TC. The building had a curved exterior wall reminiscent of the Khafajah "Oval Temple" in central Mesopotamia. However, aside from the wall, the comparison between the two buildings in terms of architecture is difficult, as each building follows a different plan.

The oldest references to Nagar comes from Mari and tablets discovered at Nabada. However, the most important source on Nagar comes from the archives of Ebla. Most of the texts record the ruler of Nagar using his title "En", without mentioning a name. However a text from Ebla mentions Mara-Il, a king of Nagar; thus, he is the only ruler known by name for pre-Akkadian Nagar and ruled a little more than a generation before the kingdom's destruction.

At its height, Nagar encompassed most of the southwestern half of the Khabur Basin, and was a diplomatic and political equal of the Eblaite and Mariote states. The kingdom included at least 17 subordinate cities, such as Hazna, and most importantly Nabada, which was a city-state annexed by Nagar, and served as a provincial capital. Nagar was involved in the wide diplomatic network of Ebla, and the relations between the two kingdoms involved both confrontations and alliances. A text from Ebla mentions a victory of Ebla's king (perhaps Irkab-Damu) over Nagar. However, a few years later, a treaty was concluded, and the relations progressed toward a dynastic marriage between princess Tagrish-Damu of Ebla, and prince Ultum-Huhu, Nagar's monarch's son.

Nagar was defeated by Mari in year seven of the Eblaite vizier Ibrium's term, causing the blockage of trade routes between Ebla and southern Mesopotamia via upper Mesopotamia. Later, Ebla's king Isar-Damu concluded an alliance with Nagar and Kish against Mari, and the campaign was headed by the Eblaite vizier Ibbi-Sipish, who led the combined armies to victory in a battle near Terqa. Afterwards, the alliance attacked the rebellious Eblaite vassal city of Armi. Ebla was destroyed approximately three years after Terqa's battle, and soon after, Nagar followed in c. 2300 BC. Large parts of the city were burned, an act attributed either to Mari, or Sargon of Akkad.

==== Akkadian period ====
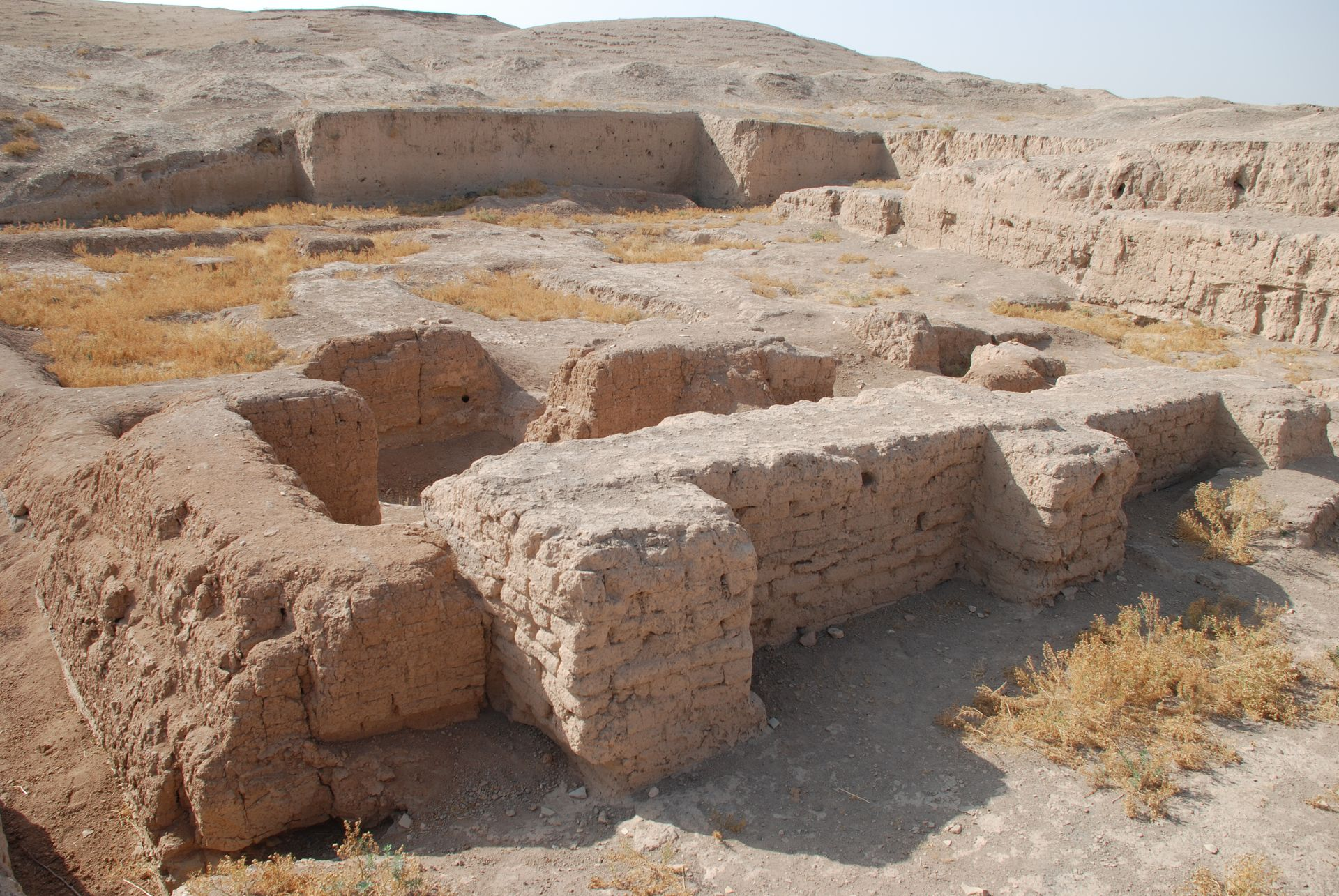
Palace of Naram-Sin.

Following its destruction, Nagar was rebuilt by the Akkadian Empire, to form a center of the provincial administration. The city included the whole tell and a lower town at the southern edge of the mound. Two public buildings were built during the early Akkadian periods, one complex in area SS, and another in area FS. The building of area FS included its own temple and might have served as a caravanserai, being located near the northern gate of the city. The temple was dedicated to the god Šamagan, god of animals of the steppe. The early Akkadian monarchs were occupied with internal conflicts, and Tell Brak was temporarily abandoned by Akkad at some point preceding the reign of Naram-Sin. (Note: The nature of the Akkadian early period is ambiguous, local texts do not reflect the reign of Sargon or his successors. Two bowls bearing Rimush's inscription were discovered in the palace of his nephew Naram-Sin, however, they could have been diplomatic gifts to a local ruler.) The abandonment might be connected with an environmental event, that caused the desertification of the region.

The destruction of Nagar's kingdom created a power vacuum in the Upper Khabur. The Hurrians, formerly concentrated in Urkesh, took advantage of the situation to control the region as early as Sargon's latter years. Tell Brak was known as "Nawar" for the Hurrians, and kings of Urkesh took the title "King of Urkesh and Nawar", first attested in the seal of Urkesh's king Atal-Shen.

The use of the title continued during the reigns of Atal-Shen's successors, Tupkish and Tish-Atal, who ruled only in Urkesh. The Akkadians under Naram-Sin incorporated Nagar firmly into their empire. The most important Akkadian building in the city is called the "Palace of Naram-Sin", (Note: Some of the building's bricks had Naram-Sin's name stamped on it.) which had parts of it built over the original Eye Temple. Despite its name, the palace is closer to a fortress, as it was more of a fortified depot for the storage of collected tribute rather than a residential seat. The palace was burned during Naram-Sin's reign, perhaps by a Lullubi attack, and the city was burned toward the end of the Akkadian period c. 2193 BC, probably by the Gutians.

==== Post-Akkadian kingdom ====
In Brak Period N, the Fall of the Akkadian Empire (c. 2154 BC), saw Nagar becoming a center of an independent Hurrian dynasty, evidenced by the discovery of a seal, recording the name of king Talpus-Atili of Nagar, who ruled during or slightly after the reign of Shar-Kali-Sharri (r. 2217–2193 BC).

==== Ur III Dynasty? ====
The view that Tell Brak came under the control of Ur III is refuted, (Note: Max Mallowan discovered a seal in 1947 and attributed it to Ur-Nammu of Ur; this led to the assumption that Ur controlled Tell-Brak. However, the translation of the seal showed no sign of Ur-Nammu's name) and evidence exists for a Hurrian rebuilding of Naram-Sin's palace, erroneously attributed by Max Mallowan to Ur-Nammu of Ur. Period N saw a reduction in the city's size, with public buildings being abandoned, and the lower town evacuated. Few short lived houses were built in area CH during period N, and although greatly reduced in size, archaeology provided evidence for continued occupation in the city, instead of abandonment. (Note: Harvey Weiss suggest the total abandonment of Nagar within fifty years following the Akkadians departure, and attribute the event to a climatic disaster. However, this view is controversial.)

=== Middle Bronze ===
==== Mari Period ====
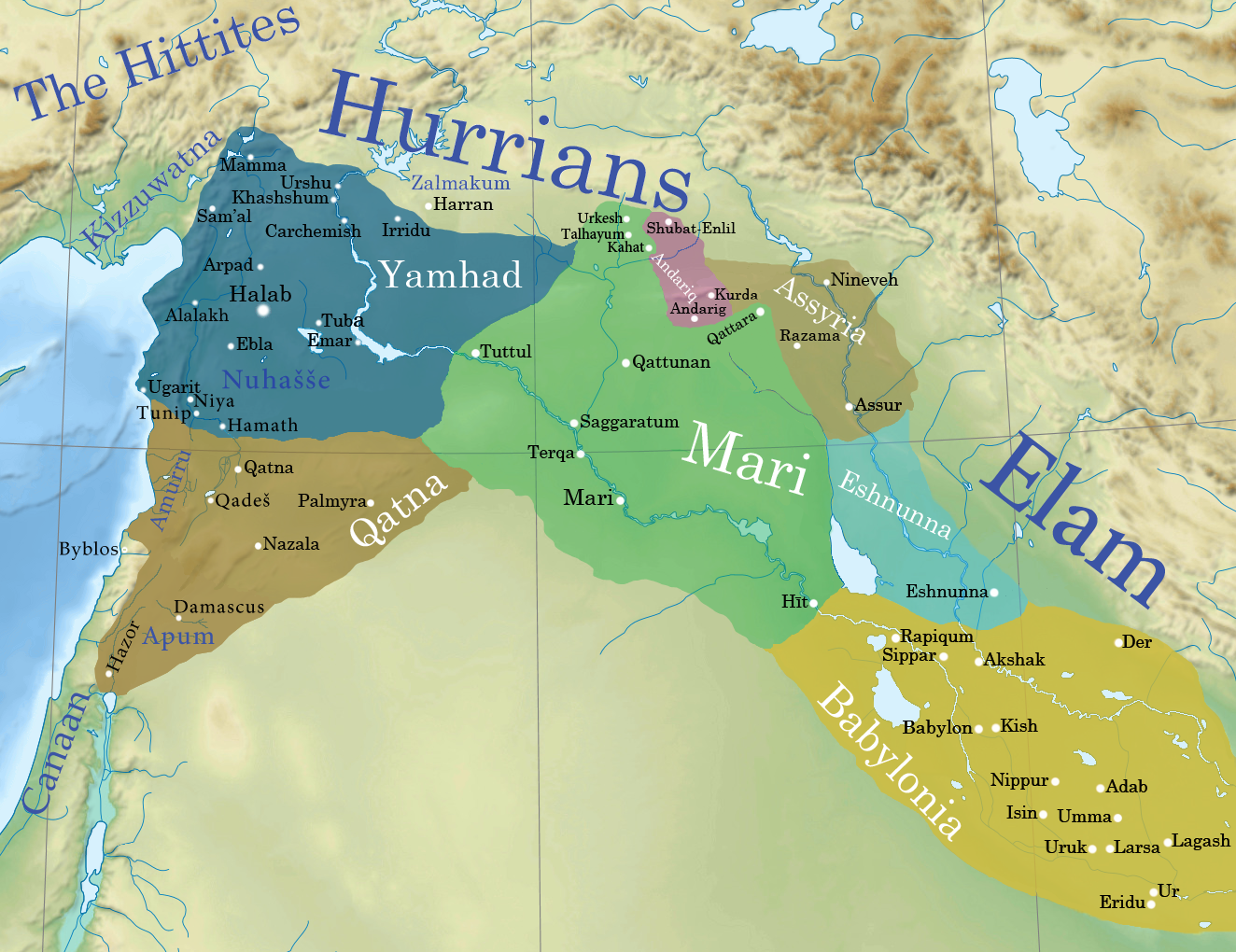
Domination of Khabur area by Mari in the eighteenth century BC. The kingdom of Andarig was also important at that time.

During Brak Period P (c. 1820–1550 BC; MB II), Nagar was densely populated in the northern ridge of the tell. The city came under the rule of Mari, and was the site of a decisive victory won by Yahdun-Lim of Mari over Shamshi-Adad I of the Kingdom of Upper Mesopotamia. Nagar lost its importance and came under the rule of Kahat in the 18th century BC.

=== Late Bronze ===
==== Mitanni Period ====
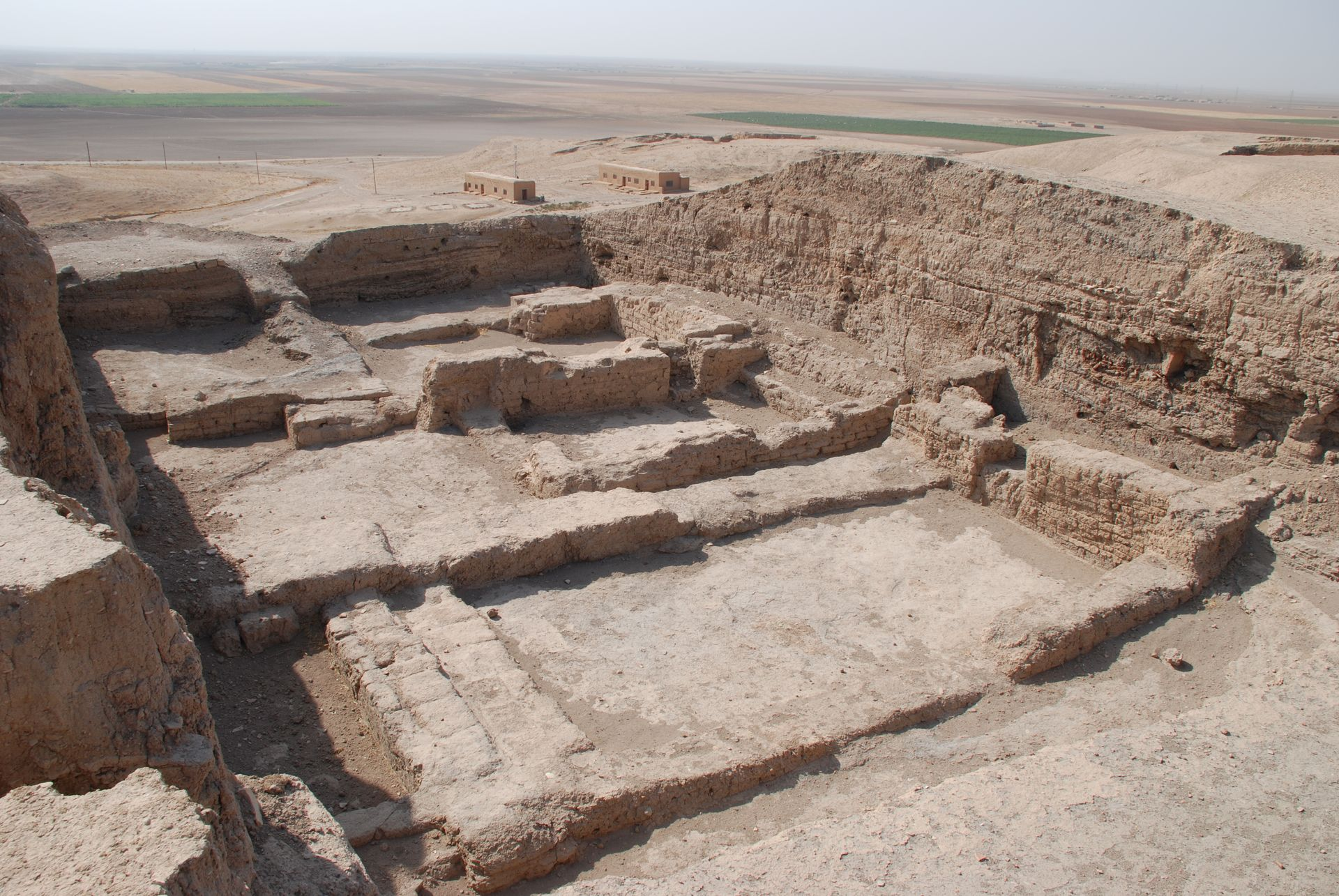
The Mitannian palace.

During period Q, Tell Brak was an important trade city in the Mitanni state. A two-story palace was built c. 1500 BC in the northern section of the tell, in addition to an associated temple. However, the rest of the tell was not occupied, and a lower town extended to the north but is now all but destroyed through modern agriculture. Two Mitannian legal documents, bearing the names of kings Artashumara and Tushratta (c. 1380–1345 BC), were recovered from the city.

==== Assyrian period ====
Following the death of king Tushratta, the Mitanni Empire collapsed. In the west the Hittites came and created a vassal buffer state in the region of Hanigalbat, while the Assyrians later took territory from the east. Tell Brak was destroyed between c.1300 and 1275 BC, in two waves, first at the hands of the Assyrian king Adad-Nirari I (r. 1305–1274 BC), then by his successor Shalmaneser I.

=== Iron Age ===
Little evidence of an occupation on the tell exists following the destruction of the Mitannian city, however, a series of small villages existed in the lower town during the Assyrian periods. The remains of a Hellenistic settlement were discovered on a nearby satellite tell, to the northwestern edge of the main tell. However, excavations recovered no ceramics of the Parthian-Roman or Byzantine-Sasanian periods, although sherds dating to those periods are noted. In the middle of the first millennium AD, a fortified building was erected in the northeastern lower town. The building was dated by Antoine Poidebard to the Justinian era (sixth century AD), on the basis of its architecture. The last occupation period of the site was during the early Abbasid Caliphate's period, when a canal was built to provide the town with water from the nearby Jaghjagh River.

== Society ==
=== People and language ===
The Halafians were the indigenous people of Neolithic northern Syria, (Note: Previously, the Halafians were seen either as hill people who descended from the nearby mountains of southeastern Anatolia, or herdsmen from northern Iraq. However, those views changed with the archaeology conducted by Peter Akkermans, which proved a continuous indigenous origin of Halaf culture.) who later adopted the southern Ubaidian culture. Contact with the Mesopotamian south increased during the early and middle Northern Uruk period, and southern people moved to Tell Brak in the late Uruk period, forming a colony, which produced a mixed society. The Urukean colony was abandoned by the colonists toward the end of the fourth millennium BC, leaving the indigenous Tell Brak a much contracted city. The pre-Akkadian kingdom's population was Semitic, and spoke its own East Semitic dialect of the Eblaite language used in Ebla and Mari. The Nagarite dialect is closer to the dialect of Mari rather than that of Ebla.

No Hurrian names are recorded in the pre-Akkadian period, although the name of prince Ultum-Huhu is difficult to understand as Semitic. During the Akkadian period, both Semitic and Hurrian names were recorded, as the Hurrians appear to have taken advantage of the power vacuum caused by the destruction of the pre-Akkadian kingdom, in order to migrate and expand in the region. The post-Akkadian period Tell Brak had a strong Hurrian element, and Hurrian named rulers, although the region was also inhabited by Amorite tribes. A number of the Amorite Yaminite tribes settled the surroundings of Tell Brak during the reign of Zimri-Lim of Mari, and each group used its own language (Hurrian and Amorite languages). Tell Brak was a center of the Hurrian-Mitannian empire, which had Hurrian as its official language. However, Akkadian was the region's international language, evidenced by the post-Akkadian and Mitannian eras tablets, discovered at Tell Brak and written in Akkadian.

=== Religion ===
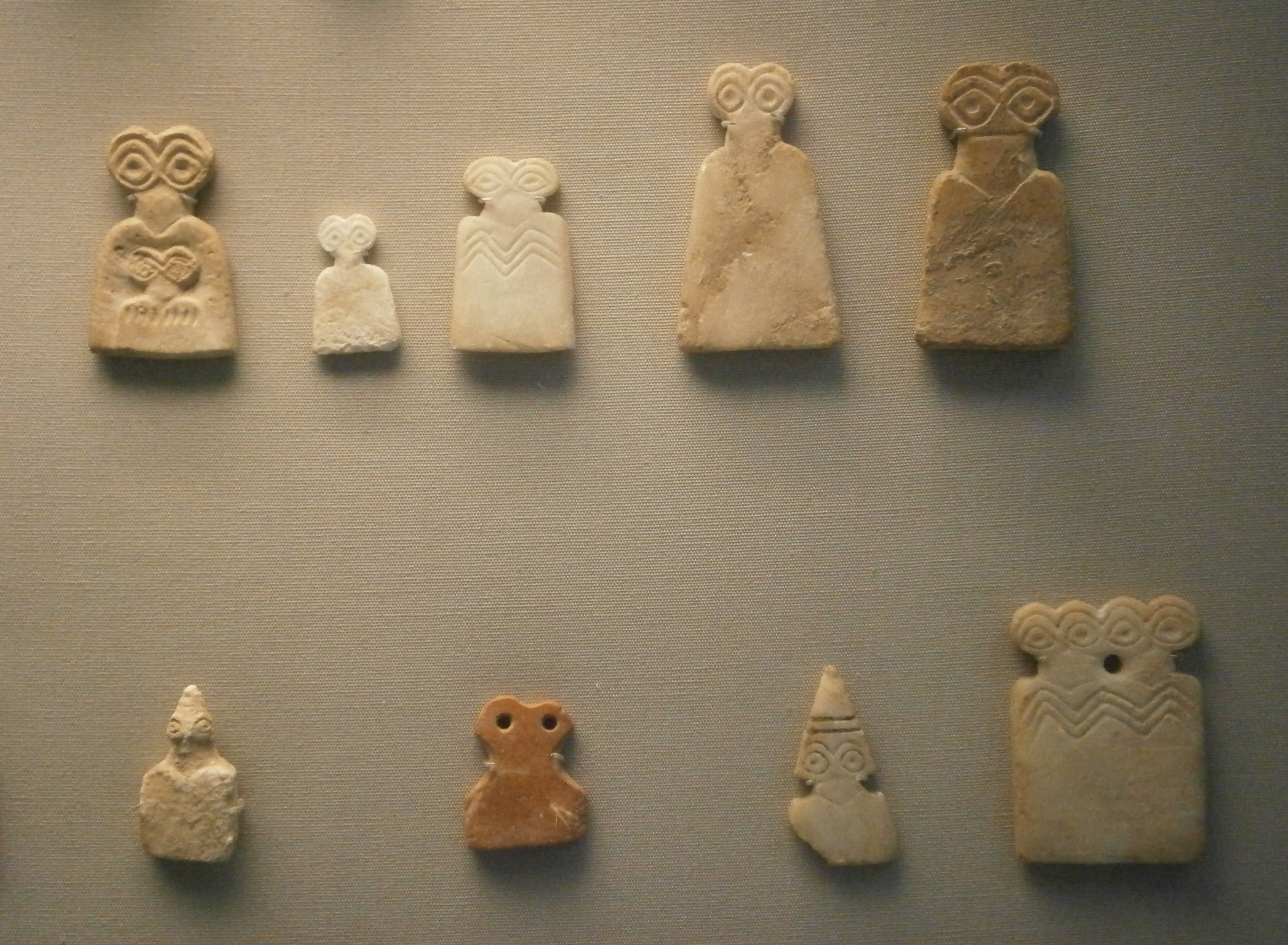
Tell Brak Eye idols

The findings in the Eye Temple indicate that Tell Brak is among the earliest sites of organized religion in northern Mesopotamia. It is unknown to which deity the Eye Temple was dedicated, and the "Eyes" figurines appears to be votive offerings to that unknown deity. The temple was probably dedicated for the Sumerian Innana or the Semitic Ishtar; Michel Meslin hypothesized that the "Eyes" figurines were a representation of an all-seeing female deity.

During the pre-Akkadian kingdom's era, Hazna, an old cultic center of northern Syria, served as a pilgrimage center for Nagar. The Eye Temple remained in use, but as a small shrine, while the goddess Belet Nagar became the kingdom's paramount deity. (Note: Belet is the feminine form of Bel, the east-Semitic title of a lord deity. Belet-Nagar is translated as the lady of Nagar.) The temple of Belet Nagar is not identified but probably lies beneath the Mitannian palace. The Eblaite deity Kura was also venerated in Nagar, and the monarchs are attested visiting the temple of the Semitic deity Dagon in Tuttul. During the Akkadian period, the temple in area FS was dedicated to the Sumerian god Shakkan, the patron of animals and countrysides. Tell Brak was an important religious Hurrian center, and the temple of Belet Nagar retained its cultic importance in the entire region until the early second millennium BC. (Note: Belet-Nagar's worship was spread in wide areas, during year 8 of Amar-Sin's reign, a temple of Belet Nagar was erected in Ur.)

=== Culture ===
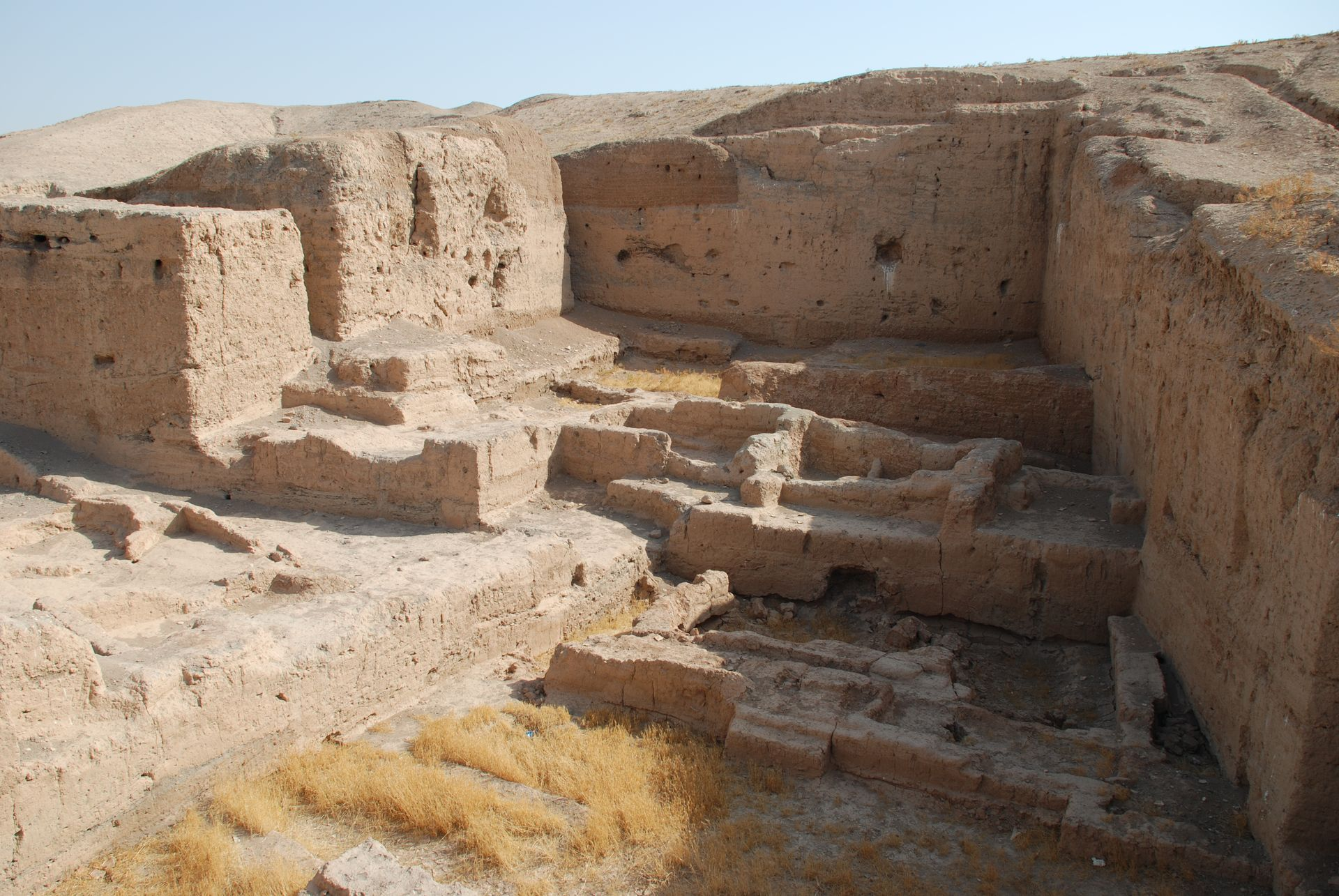
Area TW

Northern Mesopotamia evolved independently from the south during the Late Chalcolithic / early and middle Northern Uruk (4000–3500 BC). This period was characterized by a strong emphasis on holy sites; the Eye Temple was among the most important of these in Tell Brak. The main room of the building containing "Eyes" idols in area TW was lined with wooden panels. The building also contained the earliest known semi-columned facade, a character also associated with temples in later periods.

By late Northern Uruk and especially after 3200 BC, northern Mesopotamia came under the full cultural dominance of the southern Uruk culture, which affected Tell Brak's architecture and administration. The southern influence is most obvious in the level named the "Latest Jemdet Nasr" of the Eye Temple, which had southern elements such as cone mosaics. The Uruk presence was peaceful as it is first noted in the context of feasting; commercial deals during that period were traditionally ratified through feasting. (Note: Geoff Emberling argues for a southern forced take-over instead of a peaceful interaction.) The excavations in area TW revealed feasting to be an important local habit, as two cooking facilities, large amounts of grains, skeletons of animals, a domed backing oven and barbequing fire pits were discovered. Among the late Uruk materials found at Tell Brak is a standard text for educated scribes (the "Standard Professions" text), part of the standardized education taught in the 3rd millennium BC over a wide area of Syria and Mesopotamia.

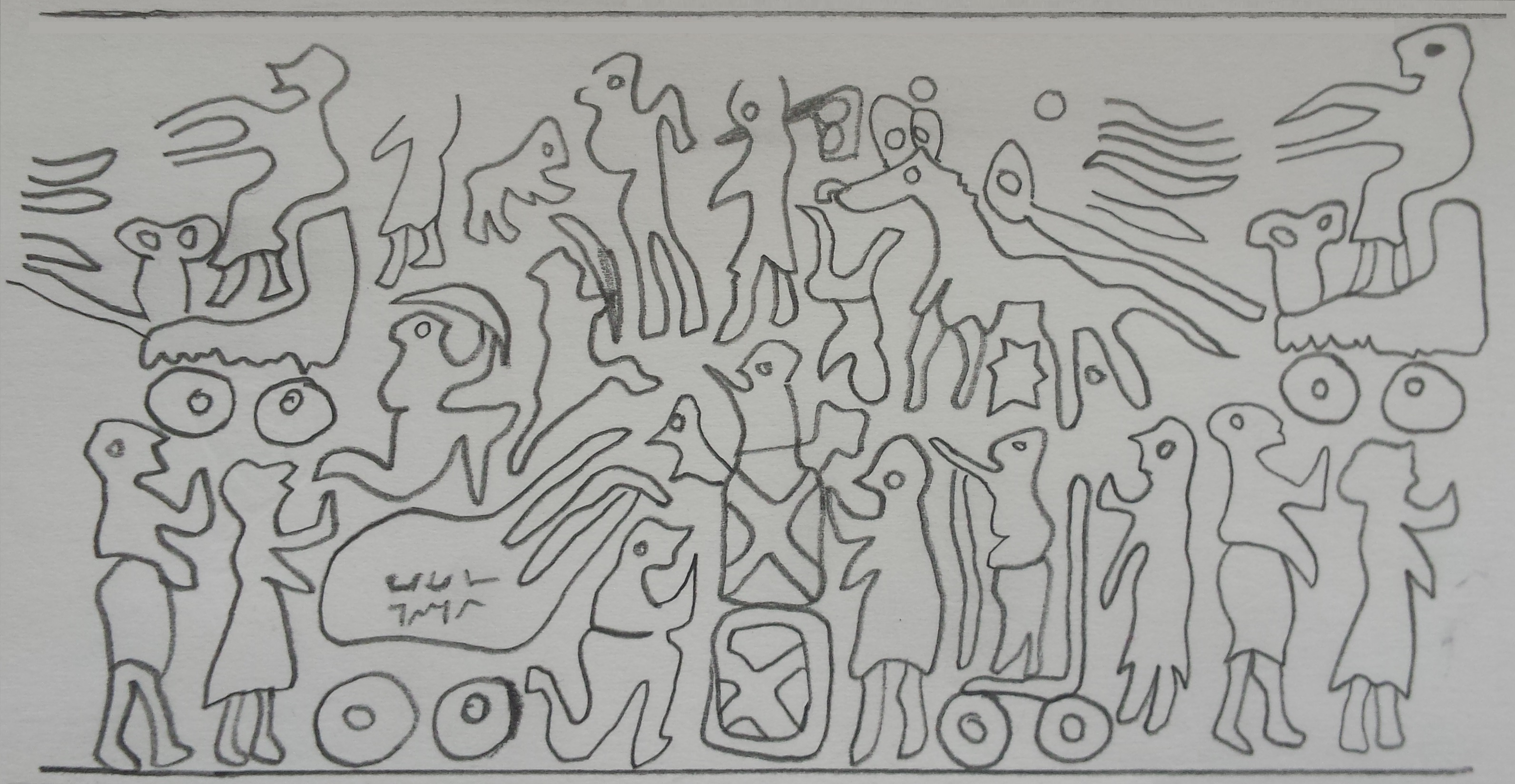
A drawing of a seal from Nabada, pre-Akkadian kingdom of Nagar, in "Brak Style"

The pre-Akkadian kingdom was famed for its acrobats, who were in demand in Ebla and trained local Eblaite entertainers. The kingdom also had its own local glyptic style called the "Brak Style", which was distinct from the southern sealing variants, employing soft circled shapes and sharpened edges. The Akkadian administration had little effect on the local administrative traditions and sealing style, and Akkadian seals existed side by side with the local variant. The Hurrians employed the Akkadian style in their seals, and Elamite seals were discovered, indicating an interaction with the western Iranian Plateau.

Tell Brak provided great knowledge on the culture of Mitanni, which produced glass using sophisticated techniques that resulted in different varieties of multicolored and decorated shapes. Samples of the elaborate Nuzi ware were discovered, in addition to seals that combine distinctive Mitannian elements with the international motifs of that period.

Prior to the Nuzi ware, the predominant ceramic tradition at Brak is known as Khabur ware. Nuzi ware retains some shapes of Khabur ware, as well as some of its surface decorations. The fourth and last phase of Khabur ware (around 1500 BC) is generally contemporaneous with Nuzi ware. Both of them occur in parallel for some time at Brak before the Khabur ware disappears.

==== Wagons ====
Seals from Tell Brak and Nabada dated to the pre-Akkadian kingdom revealed the use of four-wheeled wagons and war carriages. Excavation in area FS recovered clay models of equids and wagons dated to the Akkadian and post-Akkadian periods. The models provide information about the types of wagons used during that period (2350–2000 BC), and they include four-wheeled vehicles and two types of two-wheeled vehicles; the first is a cart with fixed seats and the second is a cart where the driver stands above the axle. The chariots were introduced during the Mitanni era. None of the pre-Mitanni carriages can be considered chariots, as they are mistakenly described in some sources.

== Government ==
The first city had the characteristics of large urban centers, such as monumental buildings, and seems to have been ruled by a kinship based assembly, headed by elders. The pre-Akkadian kingdom was decentralized, and the provincial center of Nabada was ruled by a council of elders, next to the king's representative. The Nagarite monarchs had to tour their kingdom regularly in order to assert their political control. During the early Akkadian period, Nagar was administrated by local officials. However, central control was tightened and the number of Akkadian officials increased, following the supposed environmental event that preceded the construction of Naram-Sin's palace. The post-Akkadian Nagar was a city-state kingdom, that gradually lost its political importance during the early second millennium BC, as no evidence for a king dating to that period exists.

=== Rulers of Tell Brak ===
King	Reign	Notes
Early period, possibly ruled by a local assembly of elders.
Pre-Akkadian kingdom of Nagar (c. 2600–2300 BC)
Mara-Il	Fl. late 24th century BC.	
Early Akkadian period, early 23rd century BC.
Urkesh dominance, the Urkeshite king Atal-Shen styled himself "King of Urkesh and Nawar", so did his successors who ruled only in Urkesh.
Akkadian control, under the rule of Naram-Sin of Akkad.
Post-Akkadian kingdom of Nagar
Talpus-Atili	Fl. end of the third millennium BC.	Styled himself "the sun of the country of Nagar".
Various foreign rulers such as Mari, Kahat, Mitanni, and Assyria.

== Economy ==
Throughout its history, Tell Brak was an important trade center; it was an entrepot of obsidian trade during the Chalcolithic, as it was situated on the river crossing between Anatolia, the Levant and southern Mesopotamia. The countryside was occupied by smaller towns, villages and hamlets, but the city's surroundings were empty within three kilometers. This was probably due to the intensive cultivation in the immediate hinterland, in order to sustain the population. The city manufactured different objects, including chalices made of obsidian and white marble, faience, flint tools and shell inlays. However, evidence exists for a slight shift in production of goods toward manufacturing objects desired in the south, following the establishment of the Uruk colony.

Trade was also an important economic activity for the pre-Akkadian kingdom of Nagar, which had Ebla and Kish as major partners. The kingdom produced glass, wool, and was famous for breeding and trading in the Kunga, a hybrid of a jenny (a female donkey) and a male Syrian wild ass. Tell Brak remained an important commercial center during the Akkadian period, and was one of Mitanni's main trade cities. Many objects were manufactured in Mitannian Tell Brak, including furniture made of ivory, wood and bronze, in addition to glass. The city provided evidence for the international commercial contacts of Mitanni, including Egyptian, Hittite and Mycenaean objects, some of which were produced in the region to satisfy the local taste.

=== Equids ===
The kungas of pre-Akkadian Nagar were used for drawing the carriages of kings before the domestication of the horse, and a royal procession included up to fifty animals. The kungas of Nagar were in great demand in the Eblaite empire; they cost two kilos of silver, fifty times the price of a donkey, and were imported regularly by the monarchs of Ebla to be used as transport animals and gifts for allied cities. The horse was known in the region during the third millennium BC, but was not used as a draught animal before c. 18th century BC.

==== Donkey burials ====
Burials of a donkey and a dog were found at Tell Brak as early as the Akkadian period (2580–2455 BCE). They were not accompanied by human interment. Six donkey skeletons and one canine skeleton were found; they were buried below a temple courtyard.

Also, later, during the Babylonian period, they were found at Tell Ababra in Iraq. Tell Ababra was located in the Hamrin Basin area of Iraq, which is now covered by Lake Hamrin.

At Tel 'Akko (near Acre, Israel), a donkey was found buried together with a dog, and a part of the upper jawbone of a pig. The burial was dated at the end of the Middle Bronze Age.

Similar sacrifices of donkeys were also found in large numbers at Tell el-Dab'a in the Nile Delta of Egypt dating to the Middle Bronze Age. Also, similar sacrifices were found at Tel Haror.

== Site ==
Soundings were conducted in 1930 by Antoine Poidebard although little was published. After a survey of the area in 1934, Tell Brak was excavated for three seasons by the British archaeologist Sir Max Mallowan, husband of Agatha Christie, in 1937 and 1938. The artifacts from Mallowan's excavations are now preserved in the Ashmolean Museum, National Museum of Aleppo and the British Museum's collection; the latter contain the Tell Brak Head dating to c. 3500–3300 BC. Two small cuneiform tablets were found and a half dozen fragments, all in the Akkadian period script.

A team from the Institute of Archaeology of the University of London, led by David and Joan Oates, worked in the tell for 14 seasons between 1976 and 1993. Finds included several Uruk Period numerical tablets and a number of cuneiform tablets and inscriptions. After 1993, excavations were conducted by a number of field directors under the general guidance of David (until 2004) and Joan Oates. Those directors included Roger Matthews (in 1994–1996), for the McDonald Institute for Archaeological Research of the University of Cambridge; Geoff Emberling (in 1998–2002) and Helen McDonald (in 2000–2004), for the British Institute for the Study of Iraq and the Metropolitan Museum of Art. Finds included a large cache of carnelian, gold, silver, and lapis lazuli beads, late 3rd millennium arrowheads, stone maceheads, a range of ceramic wares, and an alabaster statuette of a seated bear.

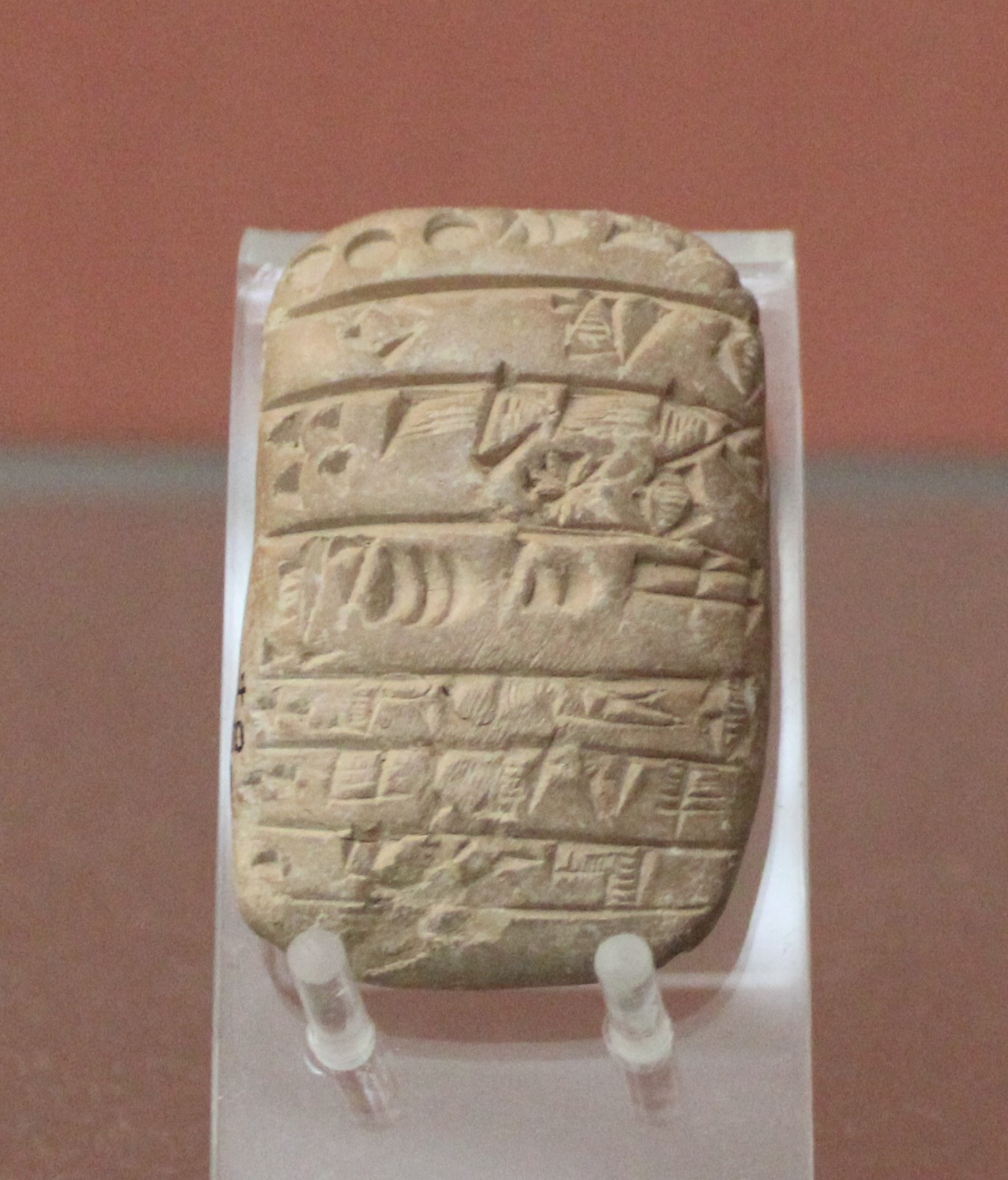
Brak akkadian tablet BM 131738

In 2006, Augusta McMahon became field director, also sponsored by the British Institute for the Study of Iraq. A regional archaeological field survey in a 20 km (12 mi) radius around Brak was supervised by Henry T. Wright (in 2002–2005). The survey data was combined with LANDSAT and 1960s era CORONA satellite images as well as historical photographs. Many of the finds from the excavations at Tell Brak are on display in the Deir ez-Zor Museum. A number of Proto-Literate clay tokens were found at the site, mainly in Uruk leveling fill but in one case in a stratified context. Most of the finds were pellets but also cones, discs, and ovioid bullae. In Late Uruk fill a number of large stone spheres and polished teardrops were found.

Excavations took place in the spring of 2011; archaeological work was then suspended due to the Syrian Civil War. According to the Syrian authorities, the camp of archaeologists was looted, along with the tools and ceramics kept in it. The site changed hands between the different combatants, mainly the Kurdish People's Protection Units and the Islamic State of Iraq and the Levant. In early 2015, Tell Brak was taken by the Kurdish forces.

== See also ==
- Chagar Bazar
- Cities of the Ancient Near East
- Hamoukar
- Tall Al-Hamidiya
- Tell Aqab
- Tell Chuera
- Tell Leilan
- Tell Mozan
