= Brack (surname) =

Brack is an English and German surname. Notable people with the surname include:

- Antonio Brack Egg (1940–2014), Peruvian agronomist engineer, an ecologist, and researcher
- Bill Brack (born 1935), former racing driver
- Brack Cornett (outlaw) (1841–1888), prominent outlaw born in Goliad County, Texas
- Gibby Brack (1908–1960), Major League Baseball outfielder
- John Brack (1920–1999), Australian painter
- Kenny Bräck (born 1966), race car driver from Sweden
- Peter Brack, American entrepreneur, founder, business leader and investor
- Robert C. Brack (b. 1953), American judge
- Viktor Brack (1904–1948), Nazi physician and organiser of the Euthanasia Programme; executed for war crimes
- Walter Brack (1880–1919), German backstroke and breaststroke swimmer
- William Jackson Brack (1837–1901), first mayor of Orlando, Florida

== See also ==
- Bracks
