= Great Brak River =

Great Brak River, Groot Brak River, Groot Brak Rivier and similar titles may refer to:

- the Great Brak River (river), a river in the Western Cape province of South Africa
- Great Brak River (town), a town at the mouth of the river

== See also ==
- Little Brak River (disambiguation)
- Brak River
