= Antoine Poidebard =

French archaeologist and Jesuit missionary

Antoine Poidebard (Lyon, 12 October 1878 – Beirut, 17 August 1955) was a French landscape archaeologist, Jesuit missionary, and pilot. He pioneered aerial archaeology in the Middle East, flying over Iraq, Syria, and Jordan.

Poidebard exploited shadows and differences in vegetation to discover mounts indicating past settlements and Roman roads, photographing these from the air and visiting some of the sites on the ground.

== Biography ==
Poidebard was a biplane pilot during World War I.

Poidebard went to Beirut in 1924. He was a pilot in the 39th Aviation Regiment of the French Levant in Mandate for Syria and the Lebanon during which time he conducted an aerial survey of desert regions. He became a priest at Université Saint-Joseph in Beirut.

His work was published in the Syria journal, attached to the Service des antiquités, with 55 photos published from 1927 to 1933. They were also displayed in the Musée de l’Orangerie in 1930. Poidebard's 1934 book The Trace of Rome in the Syrian Desert (La Trace de Rome dans le désert de Syrie) covered his work from 1925 to 1932 and included over 200 photographs. René Mouterde collaborated on this book, and co-authored another book (Le limes de Chalcis) with him. Five of the photos were also published in L'Illustration in June 1934.

In the 1934 book, Poidebard documented hundreds of previously undiscovered Roman forts and structures on the empire's Eastern periphery. He argued that these structures represented a line of defence against incursions from the east. However, recent mapping work, which has revealed hundreds of additional forts, overall aligned east-west rather than north-south, has undermined his interpretation, indicating instead that the forts and structures "supported a system of caravan-based interregional trade, communication and military transport."

While Poidebard dates items to the Roman era, many are actually from the Umayyad dynasty era, such as the Qasr al-Hayr al-Gharbi. The Lebanon-Syrian Mandate was motivated to highlight Roman legacy over Arab history, Westernizing its history and linking the civilizing of the Romans to that of the Mandate.

== Surveyed items ==
- Harbaqa Dam
- Qasr al-Hayr al-Gharbi

== Published works ==
- Poidebard, A. (1927). Les routes anciennes en haute-Djezireh. Syria 8: 55-65.
- Poidebard, A. (1929). Resultats de sa mission en haute Djezire en automne 1928. Comptes-rendus des Seances de I'Academie des Inscriptions et Belles-Lettres 72: 91-94.
- Poidebard, A. (1931). Recherches sur le limes romain (campagne d'automne 1930). Syria 12: 274-280.
- Poidebard, A. (1934). La trace de Rome dans le desert de Syrie: le limes de Trajan a la conquete arabe: recherches aeriennes (1925-1932), Geuthner, P
