= Chagar Bazar =

Archaeological site in Syria

Chagar Bazar/Ašnakkum
- تل شاغربازار (Arabic)
- Location within Syria
- 36.875°N 40.898°E
- Type: settlement
- Periods: Neolithic
- Location: Al-Hasakah Governorate, Syria

History
- Built: ca. 6,000 BC

Site notes
- Area: 12 ha (30 acres)
- Excavation dates: 1934—1937; 1999—2010
- Archaeologists: Max Mallowan, Augusta McMahon
- Owner: Public
- Public access: Yes

Chagar Bazar (Akk. Ašnakkum; Šagir Bazar, Arabic: تل شاغربازار) is a tell, or settlement mound, in northern Al-Hasakah Governorate, Syria, approximately 35 kilometres (22 mi) north of Al-Hasakah, on the Wadi Dara, a tributary to the Khabur River. It is a short distance from the major ancient city of Nagar (Tell Brak). The site was occupied from the Halaf period (c. 6100 to 5100 BC) until the middle of the 2nd millennium BC.

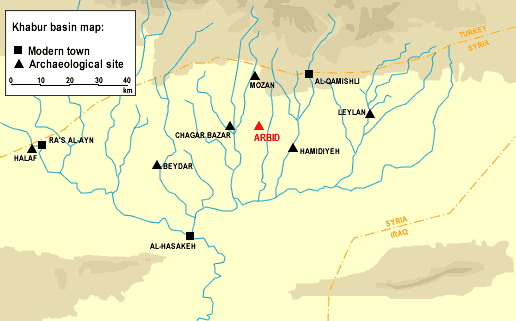
Chagar Bazar position in the Khabur River basin

== History ==
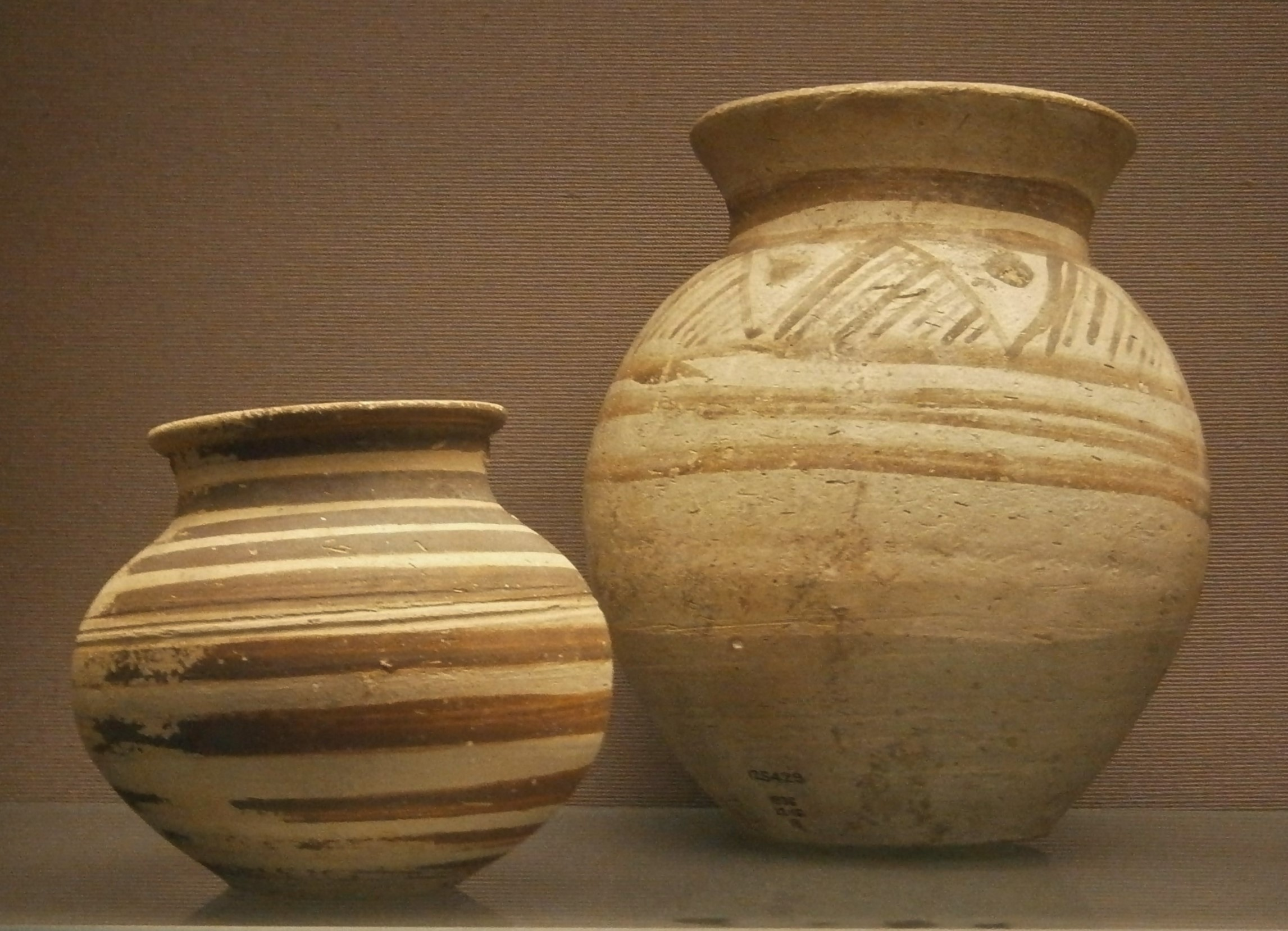
Khabur ware jars - Chagar Bazar 1

=== Neolithic-Chalcolithic ===
Chagar Bazar was already settled in the Neolithic. Excavations revealed pottery belonging to the Halaf and Ubaid cultures.

=== Early Bronze ===
By the Early Bronze Age, in the third millennium BC, Chagar Bazar had turned into a small town with the size of 12 hectares / 30 acres. The site appears to have been abandoned by the end of the third millennium BC.

=== Middle Bronze ===
In the Middle Bronze, it was resettled in the Old Babylonian period and it has been proposed as the city of Ašnakkum though there is no epigraphic evidence for that found at the site. On an Old Babylonian period itinerary text detailing a trade route from Larsa to Emar and back Ašnakkum is after Assur and then Šubat-Enlil in the westbound direction (not including currently unlocated towns).

The town was part of the Kingdom of Upper Mesopotamia under Amorite ruler Shamshi-Adad I (c. 1813–1776 BC) and his son Yasmah-Adad. One administrator of the city in that time, Sin-iqišam, is known to have had "two main wives, five secondary wives, as well as thirty-three songstresses, a group that may well have included concubines". The city then fell under the control of Mari under Zimri-Lim (c. 1775 to 1760 BC). When that city was destroyed by Hammurabi (c. 1792-1750 BC) the area came under the control of Babylon. Onomastics indicate that 29% of all personal names found in the cuneiform texts from Chagar Bazar are Hurrian. Talhawum has also been suggested as the name in this period. Texts showed that large scale pig herding was practiced at the site in this period.

=== Ašnakkum ===
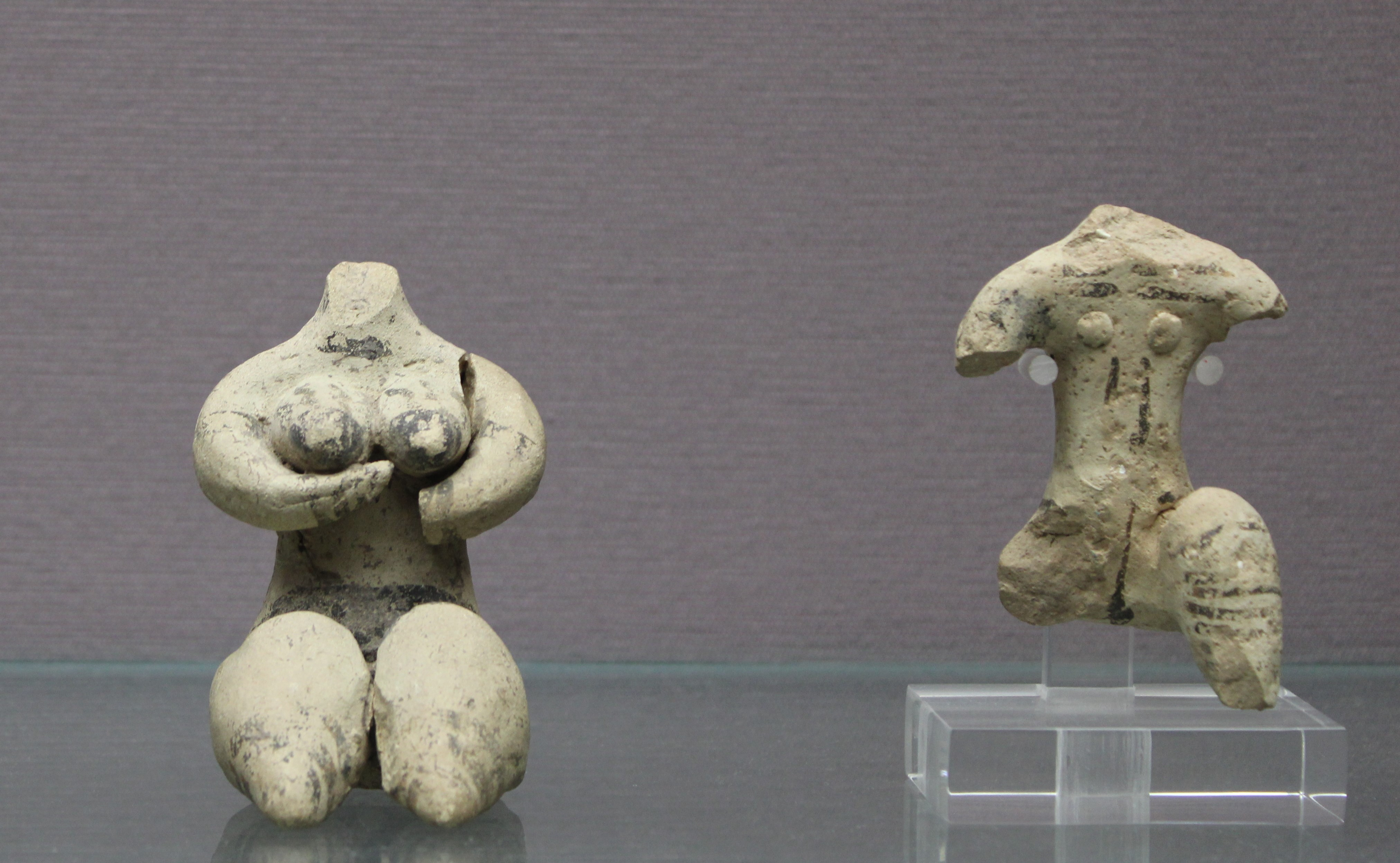
Female figurines Halaf period - Chagar Bazar

Assuming it was indeed Ašnakkum then Chagar Bazar would have been part of the Ida-Maraṣ region along with Ašlakkā, Ilān-surā, Kahat, Susā, and Šunā. Ašnakkum is mentioned in a year name of Naram-Sin of Eshnunna (c. 1810-1801 BC) "Year in which (the land of) Ašnakkum was seized", alternately "Year the lands of Ašnakkum and Tarnip were seized". In a text found at Mari the ruler of Ašnakkum complained to the ruler of Mari "I have exhausted all the clay of Ašnakkum for the letters that I repeatedly send!".

Some rulers during the period when Zimri-Lim of Mari controlled most of the Ida-maras are known:

- Sammetar In a letter to Zimri-Lime, Ibal-Addu of Ašlakka wrote:

"Sammetar of Ašnakkum, who even married Zimri-Lim’s sister, people from [...] wrapped him in leather and delivered him to Elamite power. Why did your lord, Zimri-Lim, not save him?"

- Isme-Addu (who ended up being beheaded and his head sent to Saggarâtum)
- Qarnilim
- Sadum-Labua

=== Late Bronze ===
In the Late Bronze, this region was part of the Mitanni Empire.

== Archaeology ==
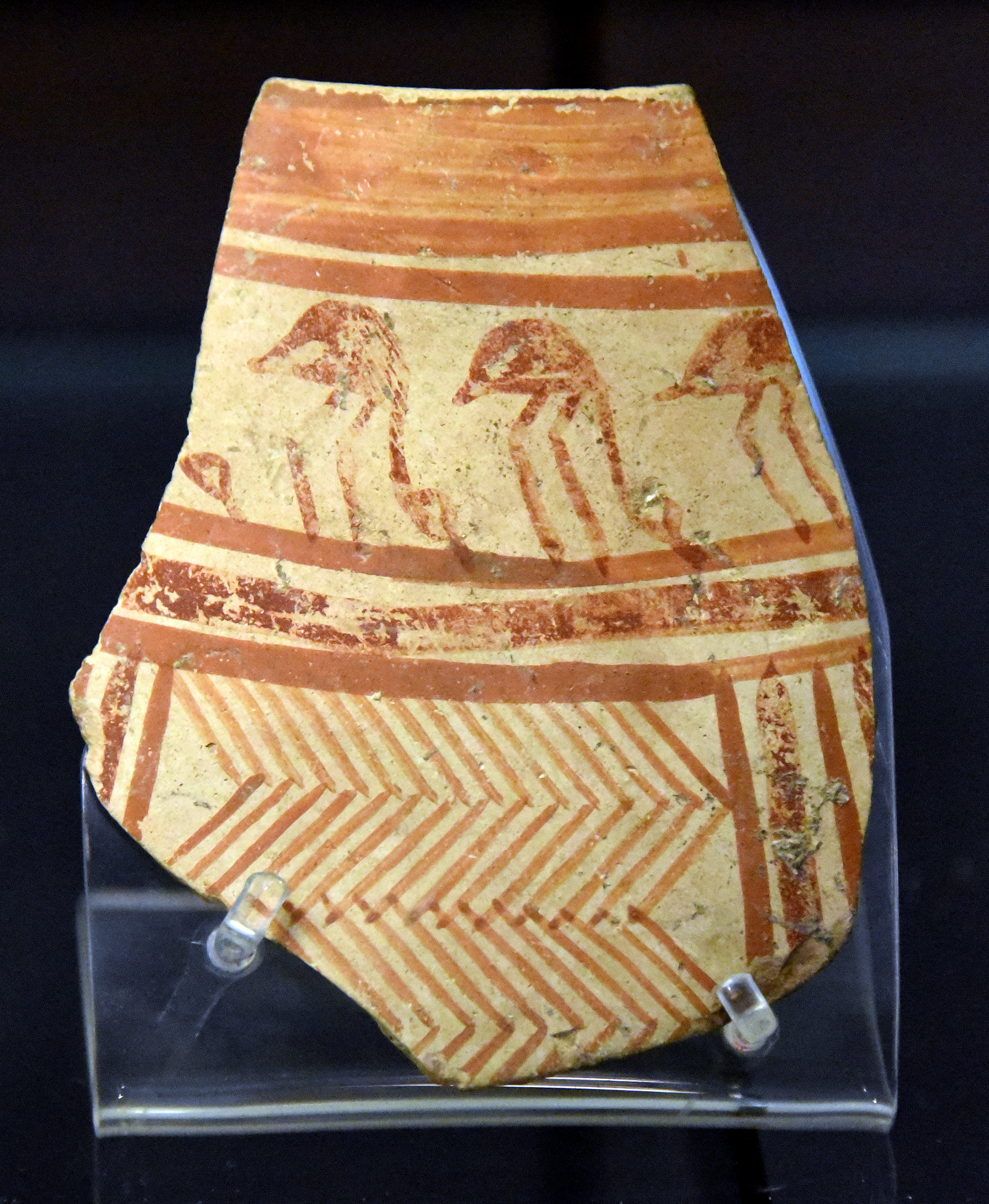
A pottery sherd. The fragment is painted with a design of wading birds. There is brown paint on creamy clay. From Chagar Bazar, Syria. Halaf period, 6000-5000 BC. Excavated by Sir Mallowan in 1935

The site contains two mounds, a higher but smaller one to the south and a lower larger northern one. Occupation was Halaf at the northern end then at the southern end in the Late Chalcolithic period followed by full occupation in the 3rd millennium BC. The 2nd millennium BC occupation was restricted to the northern (5 hectare) mound. Chagar Bazar was excavated for three seasons by the British archaeologist Max Mallowan, with his wife Agatha Christie, under the auspices of the British Museum and of the British School of Archaeology in Iraq from 1935 to 1937 after two trial trenches (A and B) were dug in 1934. Intrusive Roman and Islamic period burials were on the surface. Virgin soil was found at a depth of 16 meters where pottery of the Sakje Geuzi (Coba Höyük) type was found. Fifteen occupational layers were determined and finds included painted figurines and a Halaf period cylinder seal. About 1/2 (10 levels) of the occupation was from the Halaf period and the remaining 1/2 (5 periods) from the "historic" period. There was a noticeable period of abandonment between the 5th and 6th layers. Two nearby mounds,Tell Germayir and Tell Arbit, were also sounded and remains from the 3rd and 4th millennium found. Many of the artifacts discovered were brought to the British Museum.

Besides pottery, about 120 Old Babylonian period clay tablets and fragments written in cuneiform script were discovered, of an administrative nature. The tablets came from a 7 year period when the city was under the rulership of Yasmah-Adad, son of Shamshi-Adad I (c. 1808–1776 BC) of Ekallatum, Amorite ruler of the Kingdom of Upper Mesopotamia. Yasmah-Adad was put in charge of Mari and the regions it controlled, including Ida-maras, after the death of his brother Yahdun-Lim in c. 1796 BC. The majority came from a building associated with grain storage

Work was resumed at the site in 1999 by an expedition from the British School of Archaeology in Iraq in cooperation with University of Liège archaeologists and the Syrian Directorate-General of Antiquities and Museums. Work at the site continued until 2010 but no results have yet been published for work after 2002. Old Babylonian period textiles were found to contain Molluscan purple dye. Over 200 cuneiform tablets and fragments from the same period were found in the 1999-2002 excavations and published. More tablets emerged in the succeeding seasons and partially published. The majority of the administrative tablets came from a palace near the discovery spot of the earlier excavation tablets and dealt mostly with household accounting and records of messengers and dignitaries.

== See also ==
- Cities of the Ancient Near East
- Come, Tell Me How You Live
- List of Mesopotamian dynasties
- Tell Brak
- Early and simple domes
