= Lamia Al-Gailani Werr =

Iraqi archaeologist (1938–2019)

- لمياء الكيلاني
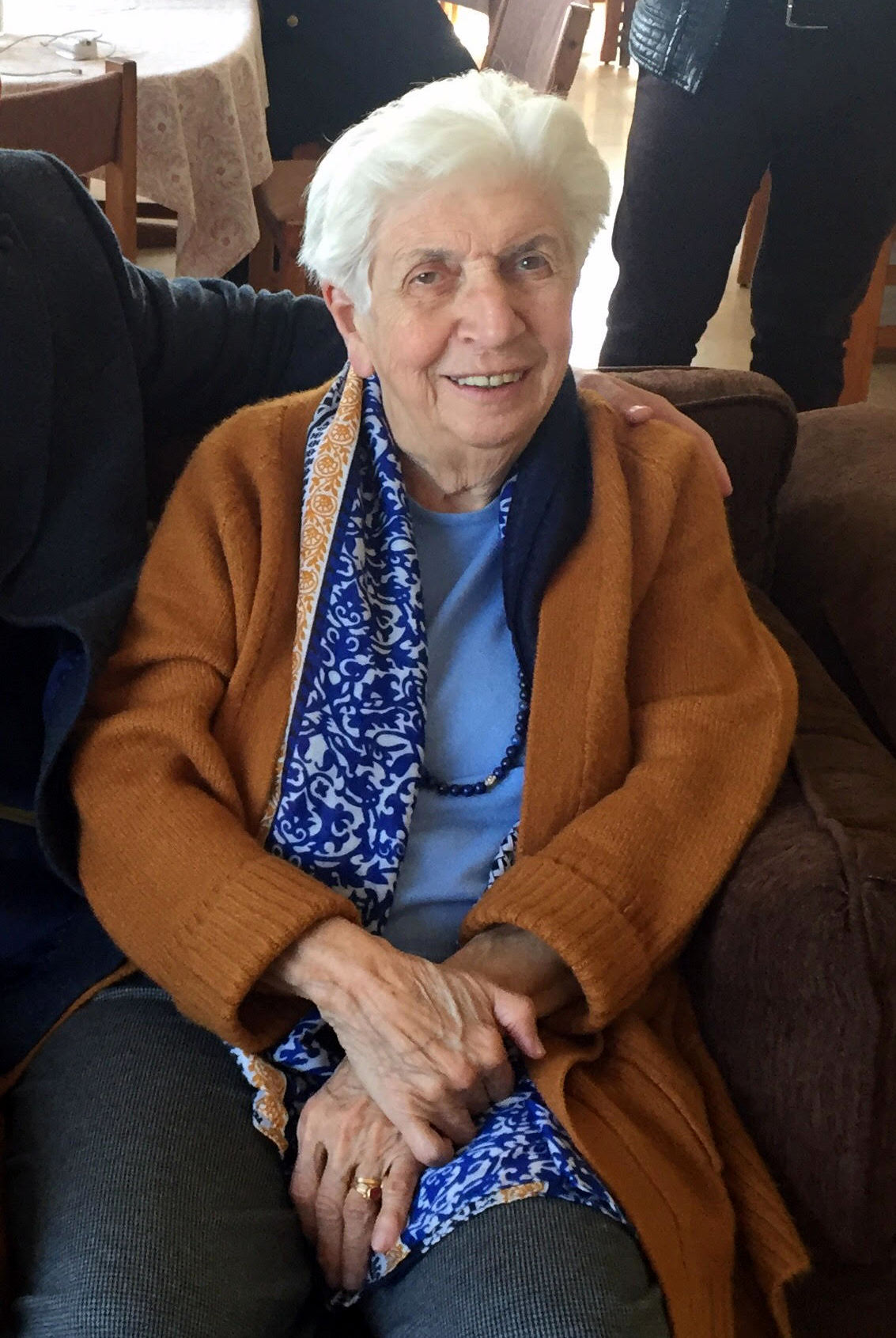
- Al-Gailani in 2019
- Born: 8 March 1938; Baghdad, Iraq
- Died: 18 January 2019 (aged 80); Amman, Jordan
- Spouses: Abd al-Rahman Al-Gailani; George Werr (died 2003)
- Children: 3
- Awards: Gertrude Bell Memorial Gold Medal (2009)

Academic background
- Education: University of Baghdad; University of Cambridge (BA); University of Edinburgh (MA); University of London (PhD, 1977)
- Thesis: Studies in the Chronology and Regional Style of Old Babylonian Cylinder Seals (1977)
- Doctoral advisor: Barbara Parker-Mallowan

Academic work
- Discipline: Near Eastern archaeology
- Sub-discipline: Cylinder seals; Heritage and conflict; History of the Iraq Museum
- Institutions: Iraq Museum; UCL Institute of Archaeology; Near and Middle East Section, SOAS

Lamia Al-Gailani Werr (Arabic: لمياء الكيلاني, 8 March 1938 – 18 January 2019) was an Iraqi archaeologist specialising in ancient Mesopotamian antiquities.

Al-Gailani was born in Baghdad and completed her education in Iraq and the United Kingdom. Her doctoral study of Old Babylonian cylinder seals was considered a landmark in the field. Based in London, in her later career she was known for maintaining links between British and Iraqi archaeology under the Saddam Hussein regime, and her efforts to preserve cultural heritage in the aftermath of the Iraq War. She was closely involved in the reconstruction of the National Museum of Iraq, where she had worked as a curator in the 1960s, and the founding of the Basrah Museum.

She was awarded the fifth Gertrude Bell Memorial Gold Medal by the British Institute for the Study of Iraq in 2009.

== Education and career ==
Al-Gailani was born in Baghdad on 8 March 1938. She studied at the University of Baghdad for a year, then completed her bachelor's degree at the University of Cambridge. In 1961, she began working as a curator of the National Museum of Iraq, the institution that would be the focus of much of her later career. She returned to Britain in the 1970s, to complete a master's degree at the University of Edinburgh, and then a PhD at the Institute of Archaeology in London. Her PhD thesis, supervised by Barbara Parker-Mallowan, was a study of Old Babylonian cylinder seals at the Iraq Museum. Published after much delay in 1988, Dominique Collon, curator of Western Asiatic Antiquities at the British Museum, described the work as a "succinct and informative discussion" that should "serve as a model for all future studies."

After obtaining her PhD in 1977, Al-Gailani remained in London as an honorary research associate at the UCL Institute of Archaeology and a research associate at the School of Oriental and African Studies (SOAS). She returned to Iraq frequently, working to maintain contact between Iraqi archaeologists and the wider academic world under the Saddam Hussein regime. In 1999, she and Salim al-Alusi co-authored The First Arabs, a popular account in Arabic of the archaeology of early Arab culture in Mesopotamia. From 2003, her work focused on the preservation of antiquities in Iraq. She helped rebuild the Iraq Museum after it was looted and damaged in the 2003 American-led invasion and was a frequent commentator on the difficulties faced by museums and heritage protection in postwar Iraq. She was a consultant to the Iraqi Ministry of Culture and was closely involved in the reopening of the Iraq Museum in 2015 and the founding of the Basrah Museum in 2016.

At the time of her death in 2019, Al-Gailani held a research fellowship at the Metropolitan Museum in New York, where she was writing a book on the history of the Iraq Museum.

== Personal life ==
A member of a prominent Iraqi family, Al-Gailani's lineage included Abdul Qadir Gilani, the founder of the Qadiri Sufi order, and Abd Al-Rahman Al-Gillani, the first prime minister of Iraq. Her parents were Ahmad Jamal Al-Din Al-Gailani and Madiha Asif Mahmud Arif-Agha.

Al-Gailani married twice. Her first husband, Abd al-Rahman Al-Gailani, was an Iraqi historian of Islamic architecture. Her second husband was George Werr, a Jordanian businessman who died in 2003. She had three daughters: Noorah Al-Gailani, Azza Al-Gailani and Hesn Werr. As of 2019, Noorah Al-Gailani was the Curator of Islamic Civilisations at the Glasgow Museums.

== Death and legacy ==
Al-Gailani died in Amman on 18 January 2019. She was interred in the Mausoleum of Abdul-Qadir Gilani (her ancestor) in Baghdad, following a funeral procession from the Iraq Museum.

She was the only lifetime honorary member of the British Institute for the Study of Iraq and was awarded its Gertrude Bell Memorial Gold Medal in 2009.
