= Mallowan =

Mallowan is a surname. Notable people with the surname include:

- Barbara Parker-Mallowan (née Parker; 1908–1993), English archaeologist, Assyriologist, and epigraphist
- Max Mallowan (1904–1978), English archaeologist, Agatha Christie's husband
