= Mona Lisa of Nimrud =

Mona Lisa of Nimrud refers to a carved ivory piece of art discovered in the city of Nimrud in a campaign of excavation from 1949 to 1963, led by Sir Max Mallowan. It is one of the most well known of the Nimrud ivories. It has also been known as the “Lady of the Well.”. In contrast, another sculpture found with it was named "Ugly Sister."

When excavated, it was cleaned by Mallowan's wife Agatha Christie. It was housed at the Iraq Museum.

== Description ==
The Mona Lisa of Nimrud depicts a woman's head and the sculpture does not extend much below the chin. It has a band around the top and bottom with peg holes. She is wearing a headdress and her hair is arranged ornately.

== See also ==
- Nimrud ivories
- Mona Lisa
