= British Institute for the Study of Iraq =

British registered charity

The British Institute for the Study of Iraq (BISI) (formerly the British School of Archaeology in Iraq) is the only body in Britain devoted to research into the ancient civilizations and languages of Mesopotamia. It was founded in 1932 and its aims are to support and undertake research into the archaeology (and cognate subjects) of Iraq and the neighbouring countries from the earliest times to c. AD 1700, and to promote the cultural heritage of Iraq. The School publishes the refereed annual journal Iraq.

It is a registered charity and has its headquarters in the office of the British Academy at Carlton House Terrace in London.

== History ==
The School was founded in 1932 as a memorial to the life and works of Gertrude Bell. Bell was passionate about archaeology and bequeathed £6,000 for its founding when she died in 1926. Further fundraising in 1929 added £14,000, and although the Great Depression left the fund depleted, the school was established in 1932. Its initial purpose was to fund excavations by archaeologists and provide scholarship to British students working on archaeological projects in Iraq.

The School carried out excavations in Iraq before the Second World War. Activities resumed in 1948, and the School worked continuously from then until 1990. Since then the School has been prevented by political circumstances from resuming its research activities. However, friendly relations with the Iraqi Department of Antiquities and contact with Iraqi colleagues have been maintained, mainly through private visits.

The School was funded by a grant from the British Government starting in 1946, which allowed it to establish a base in Baghdad. Its first director was Max Mallowan whose wife was Agatha Christie who wrote Murder in Mesopotamia. Among the notable projects the school was involved in was the excavation at Nimrud.

In the aftermath of 2003 invasion of Iraq, the school devoted its resources to assisting in the rebuilding of Iraq's heritage. Funding from the British government, however, halved in 2007, and then stopped completely in 2009. The school also receives an income from private sources. It currently has about 650 subscribing members. It is governed by a Council, which meets in London and is elected annually by the members, under Regulations approved by the original members in 1932 but recently revised.

On 12 December 2007, the organization's name was changed to The British Institute for the Study of Iraq. It also broadened it scope to promoting Iraqi cultural heritage and engaging in partnerships and collaborations with Iraqi archaeologists. Since the 1990s, it has also funded Iraqi students studying in Britain. It helped in the creation of the Basra Museum opened in 2016.

== Assyrian ivories ==
In 2011, the BISI sold one-third of its collection of Nimrud Ivories, discovered between 1949 and 1963 in excavations led by Sir Max Mallowan, to the British Museum for £1.17 million. Another third was donated to the British Museum in recognition of the storage of the collection by the museum over the previous 24 years. It is anticipated that the remaining third of the collection will be returned to Iraq sometime in the future. A selection of the ivories was put on display at the British Museum in 2011.

== Notable people ==
=== List of directors ===
- 1947 to ????: Sir Max Mallowan
- 1961 to 1965: Donald Wiseman
- 1965 to 1969: David Oates
- 1969 to 1975: Diana Kirkbride-Helbæk
- 1975 to 1981: Nicholas Postgate
- 1988 to 1995: Roger Matthews

=== Other staff ===
- Dominique Collon, co-editor of the journal Iraq from 1979 to 2010
- Barbara Parker (later Parker-Mallowan), secretary/librarian 1950–1961, and president 1983–1993

== Publications ==
Since 1934, the School has published a refereed journal, Iraq, which is now published annually, in November/December of each year.

== Bell Medal ==
The Gertrude Bell Memorial Gold Medal is awarded by the BISI for "outstanding services to Mesopotamian archaeology". As of 2019, there have been five recipients:

- Max Mallowan (1976)
- Seton Lloyd (1979)
- David Oates (1997)
- Roger Moorey (2003)
- Lamia Al-Gailani Werr (2009)
