= David Oates (archaeologist) =

British archaeologist (1927–2004)

Professor David Oates FSA FBA
- Born: Edward Ernest David Michael Oates; 25 February 1927; Stoke Climsland, Cornwall, England
- Died: 22 March 2004 (aged 77); Cambridge, Cambridgeshire, England
- Spouse: Joan Oates (m. 1956–2004)
- Children: Three
- Awards: Fellow of the Society of Antiquaries of London (1954); Fellow of the British Academy (1974)

Academic work
- Discipline: Archaeology
- Sub-discipline: Ancient Near East
- Institutions: Trinity College, Cambridge; University of Cambridge; British School of Archaeology in Iraq; Institute of Archaeology, University of London; McDonald Institute for Archaeological Research

Edward Ernest David Michael Oates, FSA, FBA (25 February 1927 – 22 March 2004), known as David Oates, was a British archaeologist and academic specializing in the Ancient Near East. He was director of the excavations at Nimrud from 1958 to 1962, Tell al-Rimah from 1964 to 1971 and at Tell Brak from 1976 to 2004. He was Professor of Western Asiatic Archaeology at the Institute of Archaeology from 1969 to 1982 and Fellow of the McDonald Institute for Archaeological Research from 1997 to 2004.

== Early life ==
Oates was born on 25 February 1927 in Stoke Climsland, Cornwall, England. He was educated at Callington County School, a state secondary school in Callington, Cornwall, and Oundle School, a private boarding school in Oundle, Northamptonshire. He studied classics and archaeology at Trinity College, Cambridge and graduated in 1949 with a Bachelor of Arts (BA) degree. He was awarded the Rome Scholarship to study at the British School at Rome from 1949 to 1951. During his studies in Rome, he took part in his first archaeological survey; an investigation of Roman olive farms in Libya.

== Academic career ==
In 1951, Oates returned to his alma mater, Trinity College, Cambridge, as a research fellow. From 1953 to 1954, he took part in the excavations led by David Talbot Rice of the Great Palace of Constantinople in Istanbul, Turkey. In 1954, he was sent to Iraq by the British Academy to review the work of Sir Aurel Stein. This work led to the publication of a monograph, Studies in the Ancient History of Northern Iraq, in 1968. From 1955 to 1962, he worked on Max Mallowan's excavation of Nimrud; Oates was director of the excavation from 1958. In addition to his fellowship at Trinity College, he was also a lecturer in archaeology at the University of Cambridge from 1957 to 1965.

From 1964 to 1971, he led excavations at Tell al-Rimah in northern Iraq. From 1965 to 1969, he was Director of the British School of Archaeology in Iraq and lived in Baghdad with his family. In June 1967, with the Six-Day War being fought by neighbouring countries, he was told by British consulate officials to leave Iraq. However, with the support of the local population (protection was offered by Iraqi cultural officials and Iraqi neighbours brought him gifts of strawberries as a sign of peace) he remained in the country. In 1968, following the 17 July Revolution, he decided that Iraq was no longer safe for his family and they planned to leave the country.

In 1969, he was appointed Professor of Western Asiatic Archaeology at the Institute of Archaeology in London, England. This allowed him and his family to return to the UK. In 1976, he restarted excavations at Tell Brak; it had previously been excavated under Max Mallowan. He continued to oversee the excavation until his death. He took early retirement from the Institute of Archaeology in 1982. From 1997 to his death, he was a fellow of the McDonald Institute for Archaeological Research at the University of Cambridge.

Oates died in Cambridge on 22 March 2004. His funeral was held at the Trinity College Chapel, on 31 March.

== Personal life ==
In addition to English, Oates spoke Arabic, Turkish, Italian and French.

During the excavation of Nimrud, he met Joan Lines. She was an American who had joined the excavations from the Metropolitan Museum of Art. They married in 1956 and together had three children. They collaborated on a number of archaeological publications and excavations.

== Honours ==
In 1954, Oates was elected Fellow of the Society of Antiquaries of London (FSA). In 1974, he was elected Fellow of the British Academy (FBA).

In 2002, he was honoured with a Festschrift:

- Oates, J.; McMahon, A. M.; Martin, H., eds. (2002). Of pots and plans: papers on the archaeology and history of Mesopotamia and Syria presented to David Oates in honour of his 75th birthday. London: NABU Publications. ISBN 1897750625.

== Selected works ==
- Oates, David (1968). Studies in the ancient history of northern Iraq. London: Oxford University Press.
- Oates, David; Oates, Joan (1976). The rise of civilization. Oxford: Elsevier. ISBN 072900015X.
- Oates, Carolyn; Postgate, Carolyn; Oates, David (1997). The excavations at Tell al Rimah: the pottery. Warminster: British School of Archaeology in Iraq. ISBN 0856687006.
- Oates, David; Oates, Joan; McDonald, Helen (1998). Excavations at Tell Brak: Vol. 1: The Mitanni and Old Babylonian periods. Cambridge: McDonald Institute. ISBN 0951942050.
- Oates, David; Oates, Joan; McDonald, Helen (2001). Excavations at Tell Brak: Vol. 2: Nagar in the third millennium BC. Cambridge: McDonald Institute. ISBN 9780951942093.
- Oates, Joan; Oates, David (2001). Nimrud: an Assyrian imperial city revealed. London: British School of Archaeology in Iraq. ISBN 0903472252.
