= Nimrud ivories =

7th-9th century BC group of ivory carvings

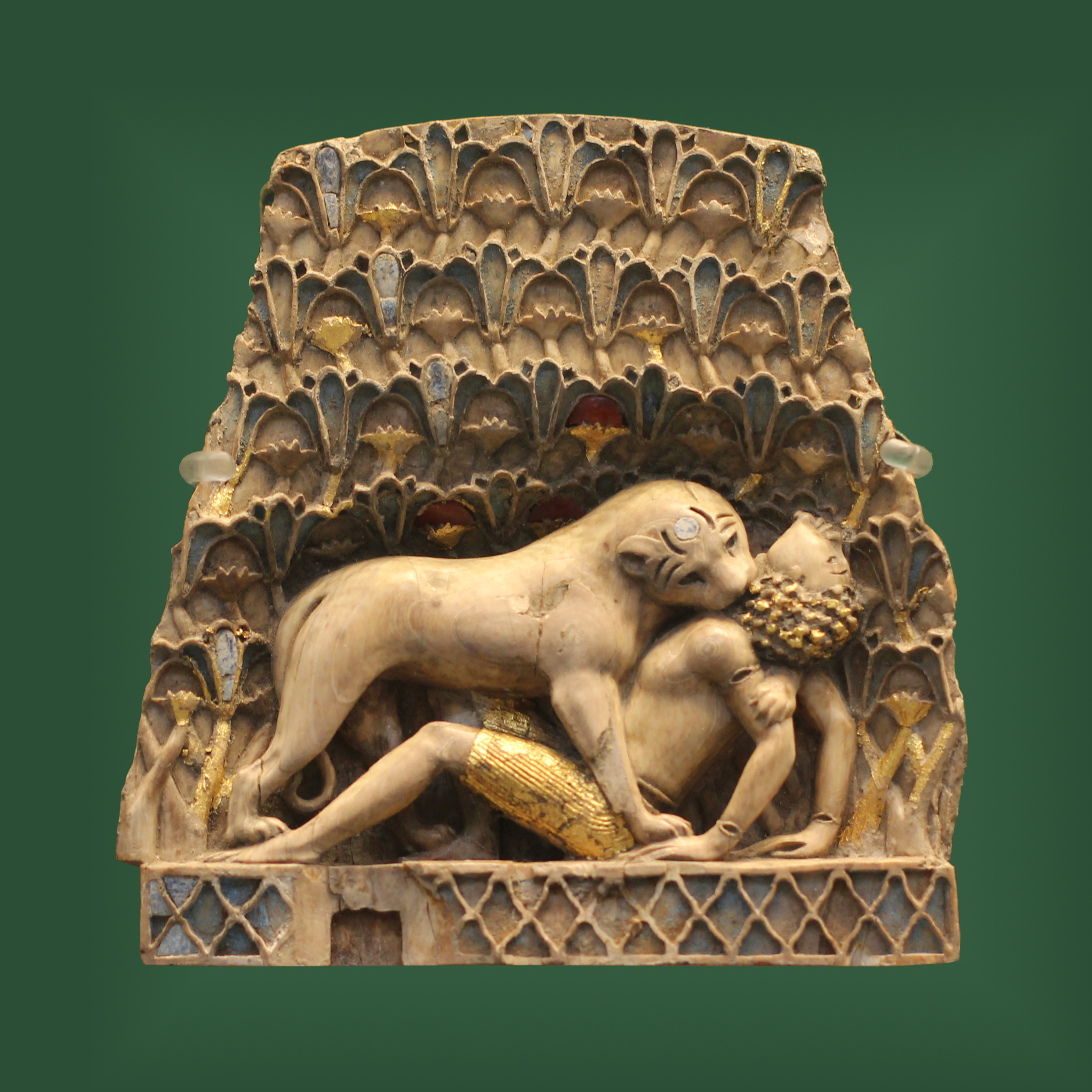
- An ivory plaque which depicts a lion eating a man, from Nimrud in the British Museum. The plaque still has much of its original gold leaf and paint.
- Material: Elephant ivory
- Created: 9th to 7th centuries BC
- Period/culture: Neo-Assyrian
- Place: Nimrud
- Present location: British Museum, London, National Museum of Iraq, Baghdad, and elsewhere
- Identification: 1954,0508.1

The Nimrud ivories are a large group of small carved ivory plaques and figures dating from the 9th to the 7th centuries BC that were excavated from the Assyrian city of Nimrud (in modern Ninawa in Iraq) during the 19th and 20th centuries. The ivories mostly originated outside Mesopotamia and are thought to have been made in the Levant and Egypt, and have frequently been attributed to the Phoenicians due to a number of the ivories containing Phoenician inscriptions. They are foundational artefacts in the study of Phoenician art, together with the Phoenician metal bowls, which were discovered at the same time but identified as Phoenician a few years earlier. However, both the bowls and the ivories pose a significant challenge as no examples of either – or any other artefacts with equivalent features – have been found in Phoenicia or other major colonies (e.g. Carthage, Malta, Sicily).

Most are fragments of the original forms; there are over 1,000 significant pieces, and many more very small fragments. They are carved with motifs typical of those regions and were used to decorate a variety of high-status objects, including pieces of furniture, chariots and horse-trappings, weapons, and small portable objects of various kinds. Many of the ivories would have originally been decorated with gold leaf or semi-precious stones, which were stripped from them at some point before their final burial. A large group were found in what was apparently a palace storeroom for unused furniture. Many were found at the bottom of wells, having apparently been dumped there when the city was sacked during the poorly-recorded collapse of the Assyrian Empire between 616 BC and 599 BC.

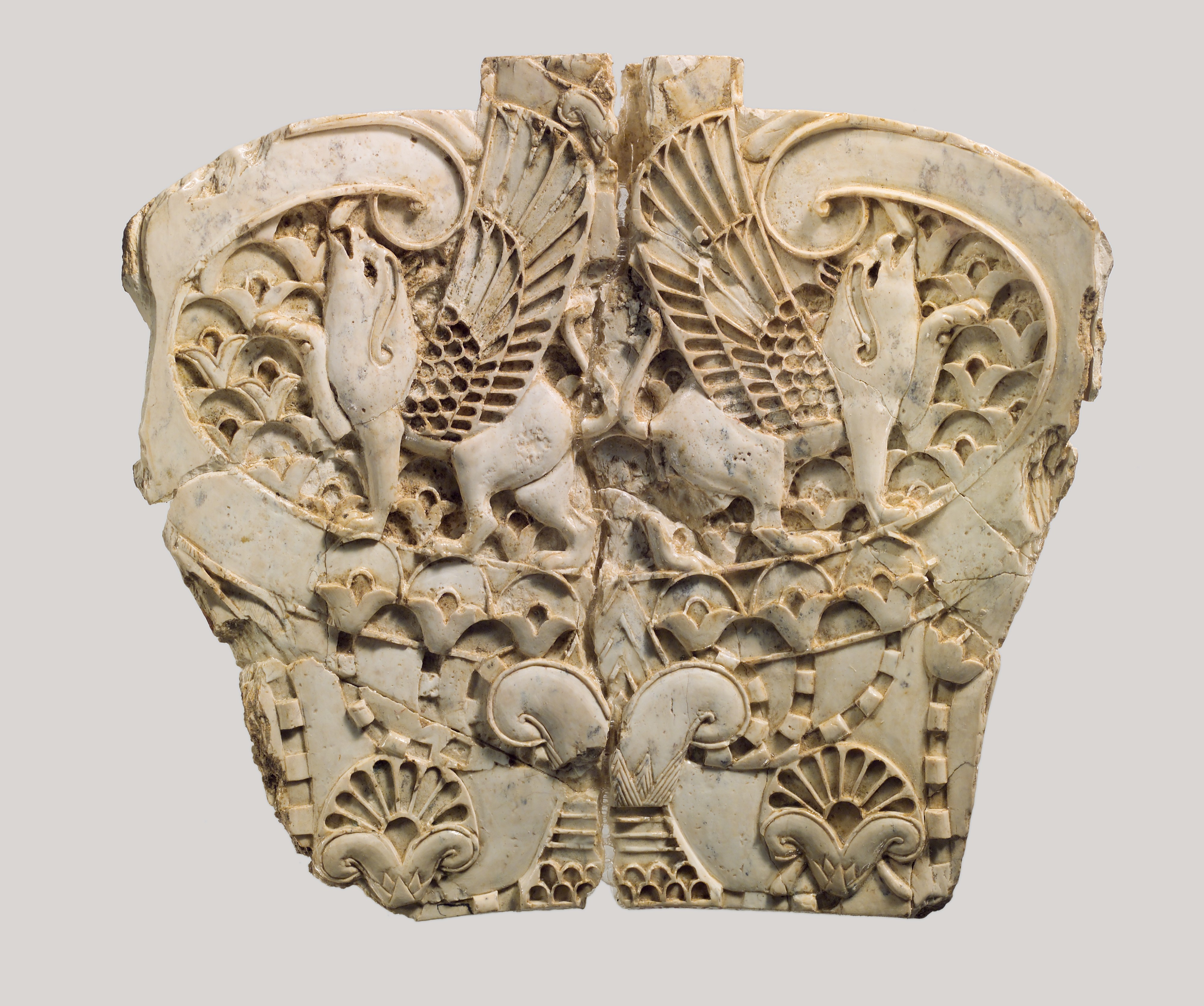
Cloisonné furniture plaque with two griffins in a floral landscape, Phoenician style, Metropolitan Museum of Art

Many of the ivories were taken to the United Kingdom and were deposited in (though not owned by) the British Museum. In 2011, the Museum acquired most of the British-held ivories through a donation and purchase and is to put a selection on view. It is intended that the remainder will be returned to Iraq. A significant number of ivories were already held by Iraqi institutions but many have been lost or damaged through war and looting. Other museums around the world have groups of pieces.

== Description ==
The ivories comprise plaques decorated in relief with intricate carvings of sphinxes, lions, serpents, people, flowers and geometric motifs, as well as carvings of female heads and female figurines. They were carved in various locations across the Ancient Near East, including Egypt, modern Syria and Lebanon, with relatively few carved locally. The ivory used to make these objects would originally have been derived from Syrian elephants which were endemic in the Middle East in ancient times, but by the 8th century BC the Syrian elephant had been hunted close to extinction, and ivory for later objects would have had to be imported from India, or, more likely, Africa.

The ivory plaques are thought to have been used to decorate chariots, furniture and horse trappings, and would originally have been covered in gold leaf or ornamented with semi-precious stones such as lapis lazuli. Some pieces still preserve remnants of gold leafing. Many were already centuries old when put in storage and may have fallen out of fashion by that time. The gold may have been removed from the ivories before they were put in storage, or it may have been taken by the Babylonians when they sacked and razed Nimrud in 612 BC.

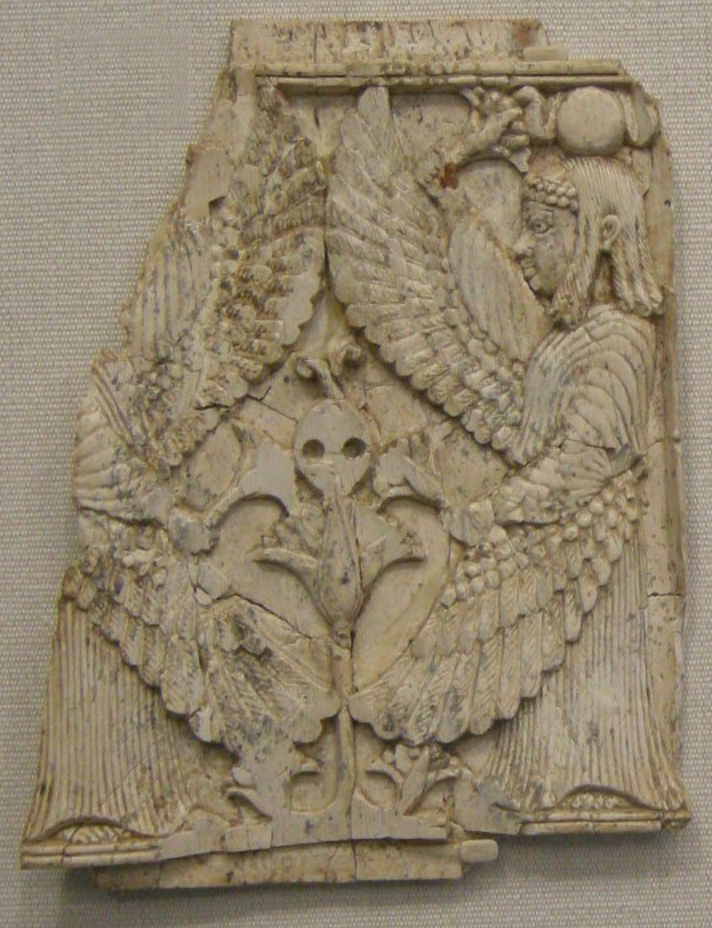
Plaque

Some of the ivories have Phoenician letters engraved on their back, which it is thought may have been used as guides to the assembly of pieces onto the furniture to which the ivories were attached. The presence of Phoenician letters on the ivories suggests that they were the product of Phoenician craftsmen.

In addition to plaques, many small ivory carvings of female heads have been found at Nimrud, most only one or two inches in height, but a few over 5 inches tall. Many of these heads wear a flat cap which is very similar to the flat caps depicted on much earlier ivories from the Tel Megiddo site in modern Israel. Another common carved form found at Nimrud comprises figurines of two naked females joined back to back, which are thought to have been used either as handles for fans or mirrors, or as a decorative element on furniture.

The plaques show a wide variety of themes, some of which exhibit a pure Assyrian style, and some of which show Egyptian influence, with engravings of Egyptian people or gods, and even Egyptian hieroglyphs. However, the Egyptian themes are often misconstrued, and the hieroglyphs do not form valid names, so they would seem to be debased imitations of Egyptian art.

A far greater number of ivories were found at Nimrud than at any other Assyrian site, and it is thought that they had been brought to Nimrud as booty or imported as luxury goods from cities on the Mediterranean coast. Some centuries later it seems that these objects fell out of fashion, and were put into storage.

== Discoveries ==
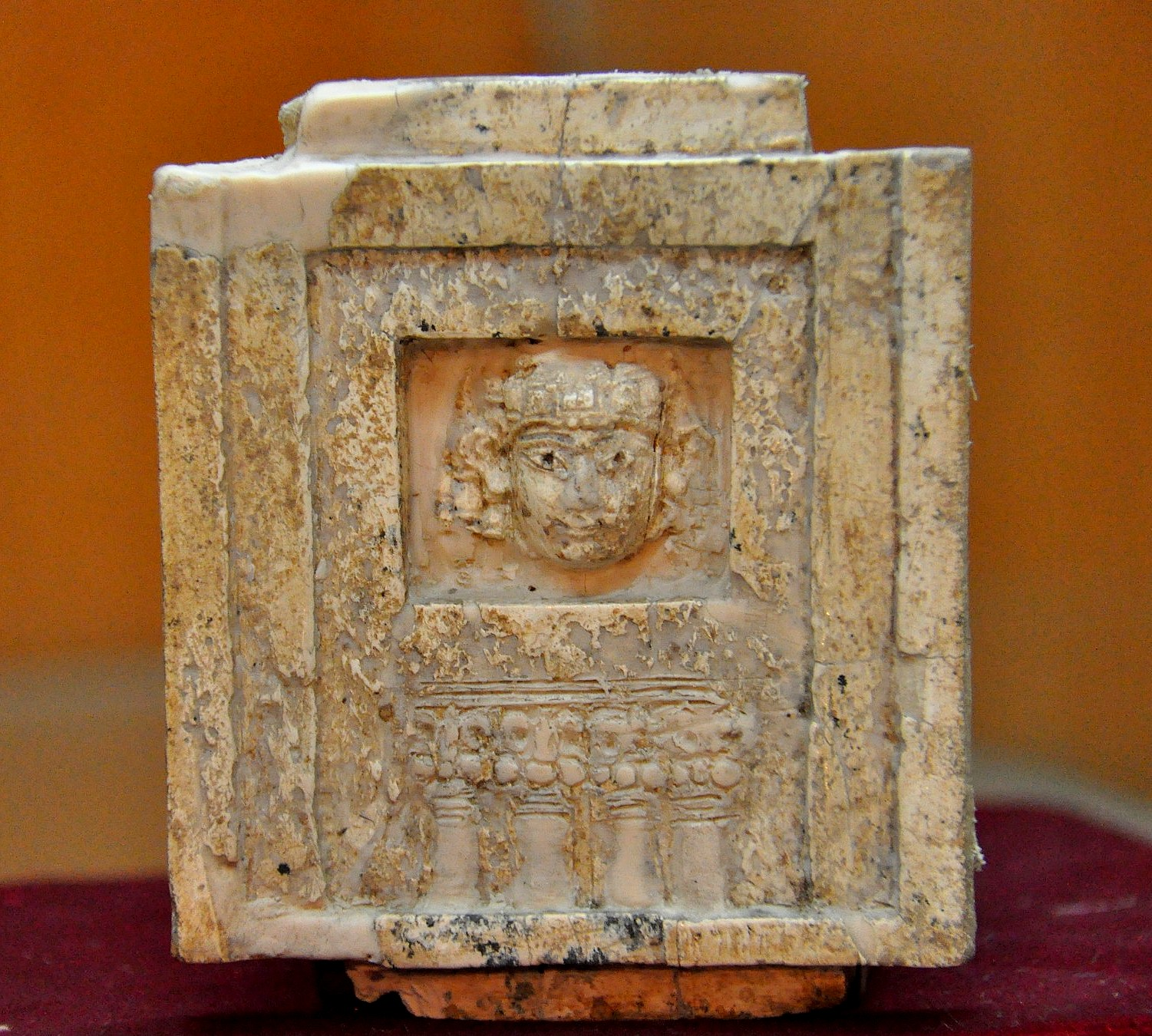
"The lady at the window", Sulaymaniyah Museum, Iraq.

=== Layard (1845) ===
The first group of ivories was excavated from the site of the palace of Shalmaneser III (ruled 859–824 BC) at the Assyrian capital of Nimrud. The palace was rediscovered in 1845 by Austin Henry Layard, on the very first day of his excavations; on the second day, he made the first discovery of ivories.

=== Loftus (1854–1855) ===
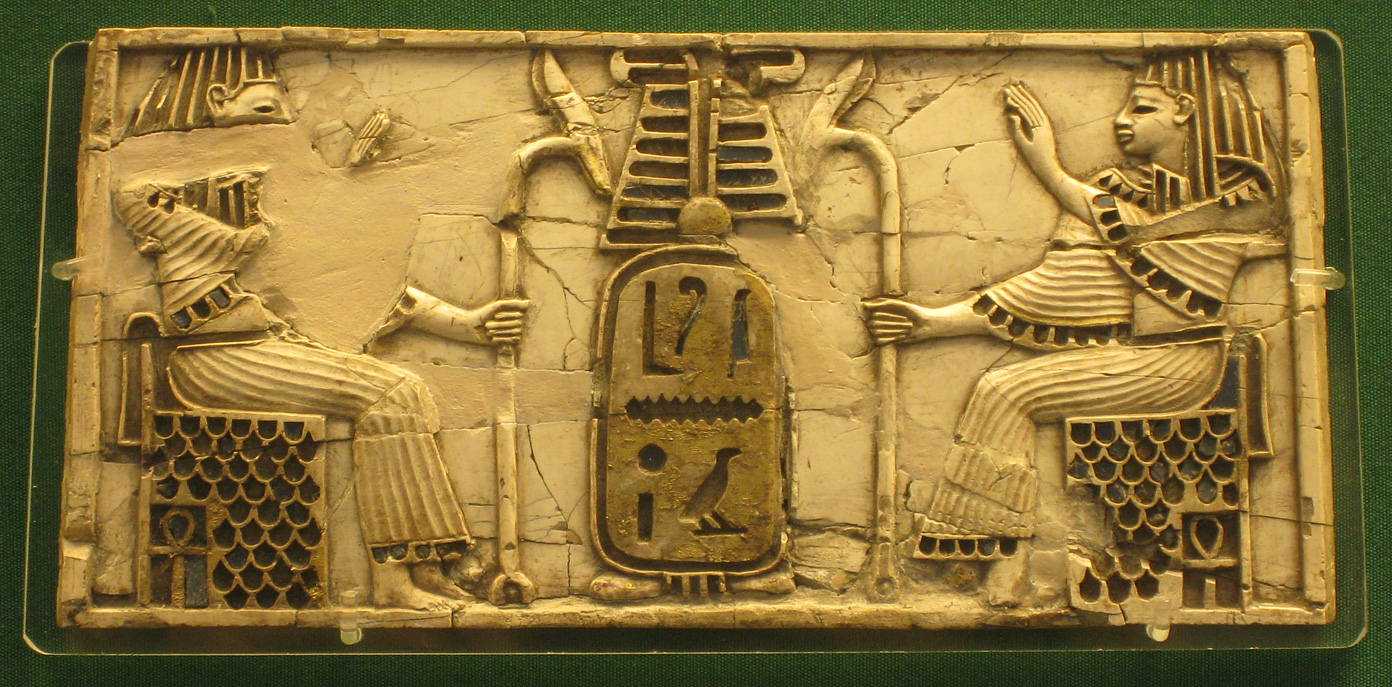
Plaque made in Egypt

More ivories were found during William Kennett Loftus's excavations in 1854–1855. They were found in a group of buildings labelled the "South-East Palace" or "Burnt Palace"; Loftus described the circumstances of the discovery in a letter to the Journal of Sacred Literature in February 1855:

The S.E. Palace at Nimroud has just yielded a large collection of beautiful ivories, relics of a throne or furniture, &c. They have been fitted together by means of rivets, slides, and grooves – a complete Assyrian puzzle, and somewhat dangerous to sit on! Many exhibit traces of gilding and enamel, and were probably broken up for the inlaid gold and jewels with which they were once adorned. There is a decided Egypto-Assyrian character about the whole collection, perfect Egyptian heads being mixed with Assyrian Bulls and Lions. The heads were very fine indeed. Some of the articles were maces, dagger-handles, or portions of chairs and tables (for we have undoubted evidence of the Assyrians using such.) Figures back to back form a shaft, and support a flower-headed capital. There are also boxes, and a vase – all elaborately carved. The Assyrians were adepts in veneering, the layers being highly ornamented with sacred emblems and lion-hunts. Phoenician inscriptions are found on two of three articles. They were found strewed at the bottom of a chamber among wood ashes. They had escaped the flames, but are blackened from lying among smouldering wood. I have got up a horse-load of objects, and am fitting them together as fast as possible, preparatory to boiling them in gelatine. The whole room is not yet explored, as the earth must first be removed from above. I propose going down to-morrow.

=== Mallowan (1949–1963) ===
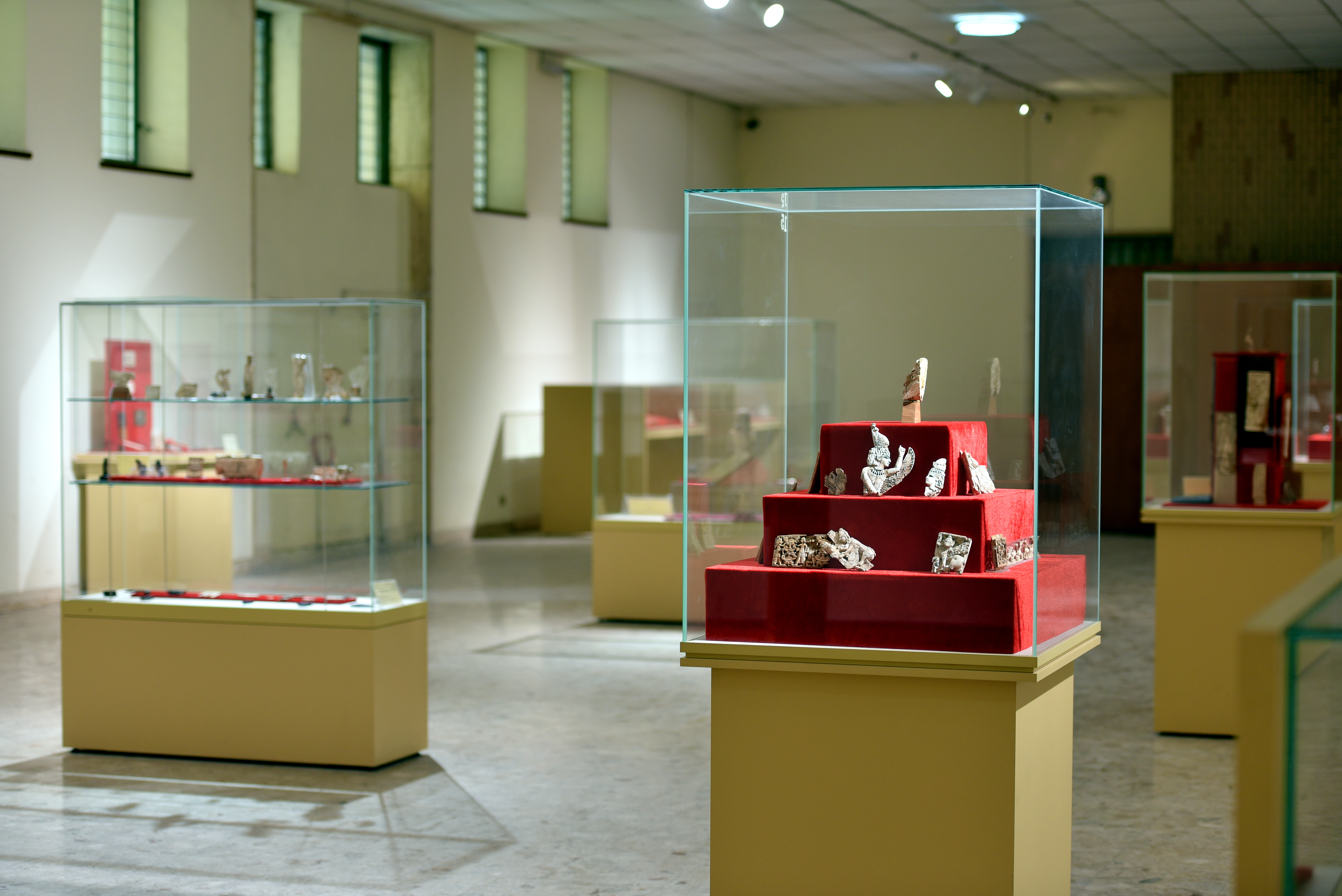
The Hall of Nimrud Ivories at the Iraq Museum in Baghdad, Iraq. This hall displays a larger number of Nimrud ivories than any other museum.

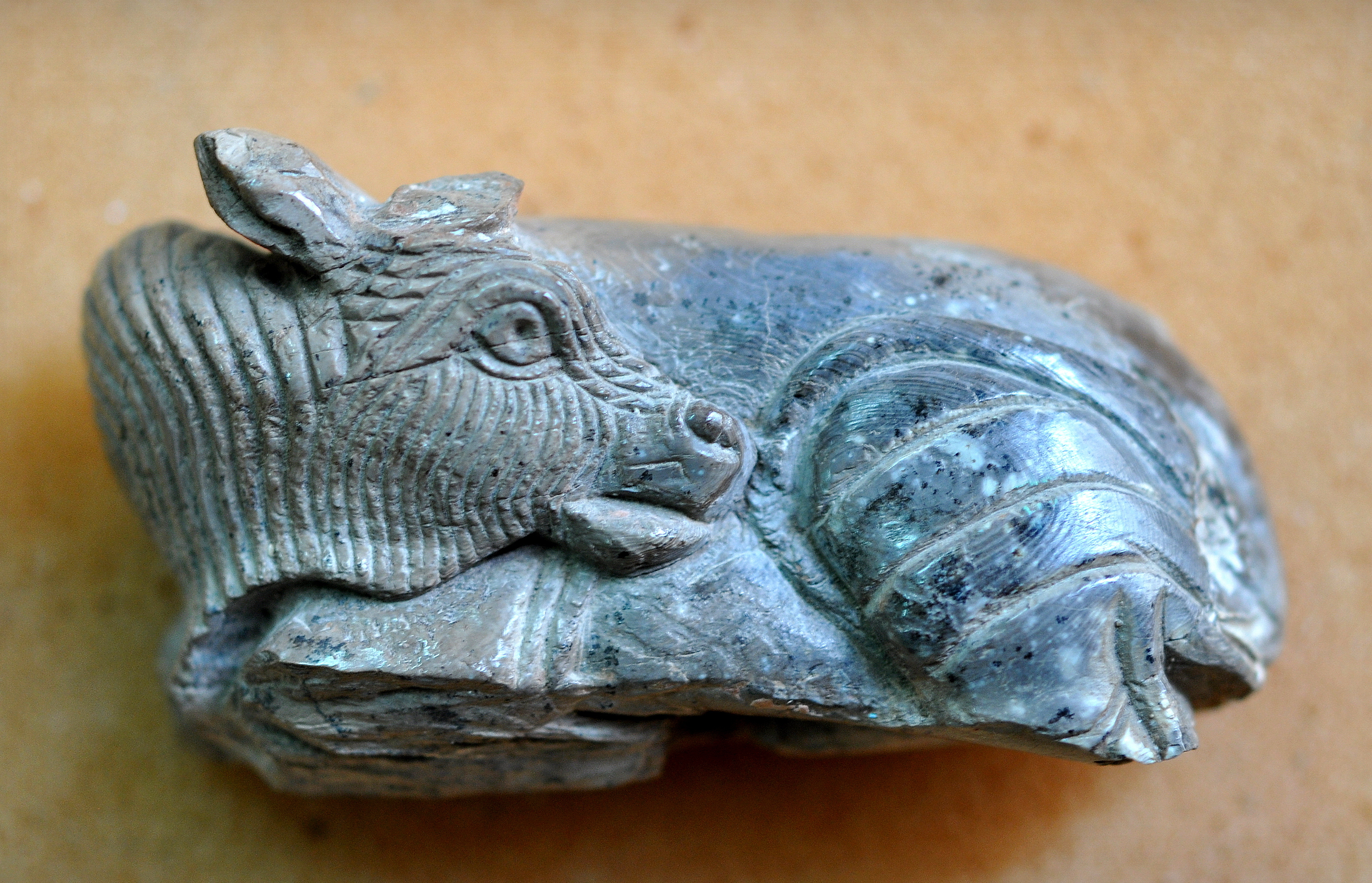
A supine bull, one of the Nimrud ivories found by Sir Max Mallowan, The Sulaymaniyah Museum, Iraq

Further discoveries were made between 1949 and 1963 by a team from the British School of Archaeology in Iraq led by the archaeologist Max Mallowan. Mallowan found thousands of ivories, many of which were discovered at the bottom of wells into which they had apparently been thrown when the city was sacked, either in the turmoil that followed the death of Sargon II in 705 BC or when Nineveh fell and was destroyed in 612 BC. Mallowan's wife was the famous British crime novelist, Agatha Christie (1890–1976), who was fascinated with archaeology, and who accompanied her husband on the Nimrud excavations. Christie helped photograph and preserve many of the ivories found during the excavations, explaining in her autobiography that she cleaned the ivories using a fine knitting needle, an orange stick and a pot of face cream.

The collection of ivories uncovered by Mallowan were divided between Iraq and Britain, where they remained at the British School of Archaeology in Iraq (later to become the British Institute for the Study of Iraq) until 1987. They were then put in storage at the British Museum until 2011, but were not put on display. Many of the Iraqi-held ivories have been lost or damaged. Following the Iraq War 2003 the National Museum of Iraq in Baghdad was looted, and many of the ivories kept there were damaged or stolen. Other ivories that were stored in a bank vault in Baghdad were damaged by water when the building was shelled.

In March 2011, the British Museum purchased one third of the Mallowan ivories (comprising 1,000 complete ivories and 5,000 fragments) from the British Institute for the Study of Iraq for £1.17 million, following a public fundraising campaign that raised £750,000 in six months, and with the support of grants from the National Heritage Memorial Fund and the Art Fund. This is the second most expensive purchase by the British Museum since the end of the Second World War.

In addition to the purchase, the British Institute for the Study of Iraq has also donated another third of its collection to the British Museum in recognition of the storage of the collection by the museum over the previous 24 years. It is anticipated that the remaining third of the collection will be returned to Iraq sometime in the future. A selection of the ivories will be put on display at the British Museum from 14 March 2011.

=== Oates (1957–1963) ===
The largest single ivory find was made between 1957 and 1963 when a British School team led by David Oates discovered a room at the Nimrud palace that was dubbed the "ivory room", which had apparently served as the main storage centre for ivory objects amassed by the Assyrian kings. Subsequent excavations by the Iraqi Department of Antiquities unearthed still more ivories.

=== Other discoveries ===
In recent years excavations by the Iraqi Department of Antiquities have unearthed more ivories.

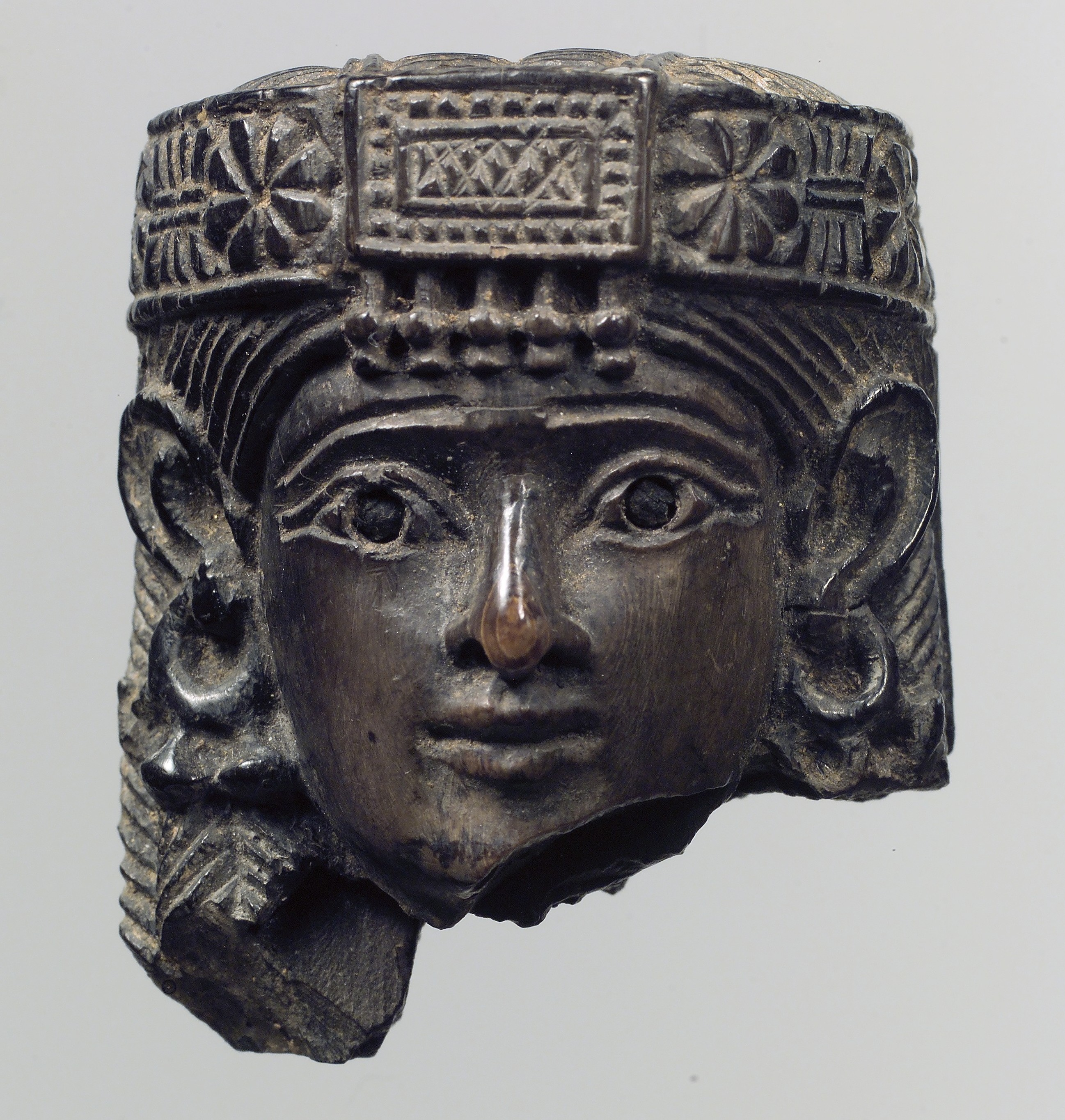
Female head, probably from a statuette, Syrian style

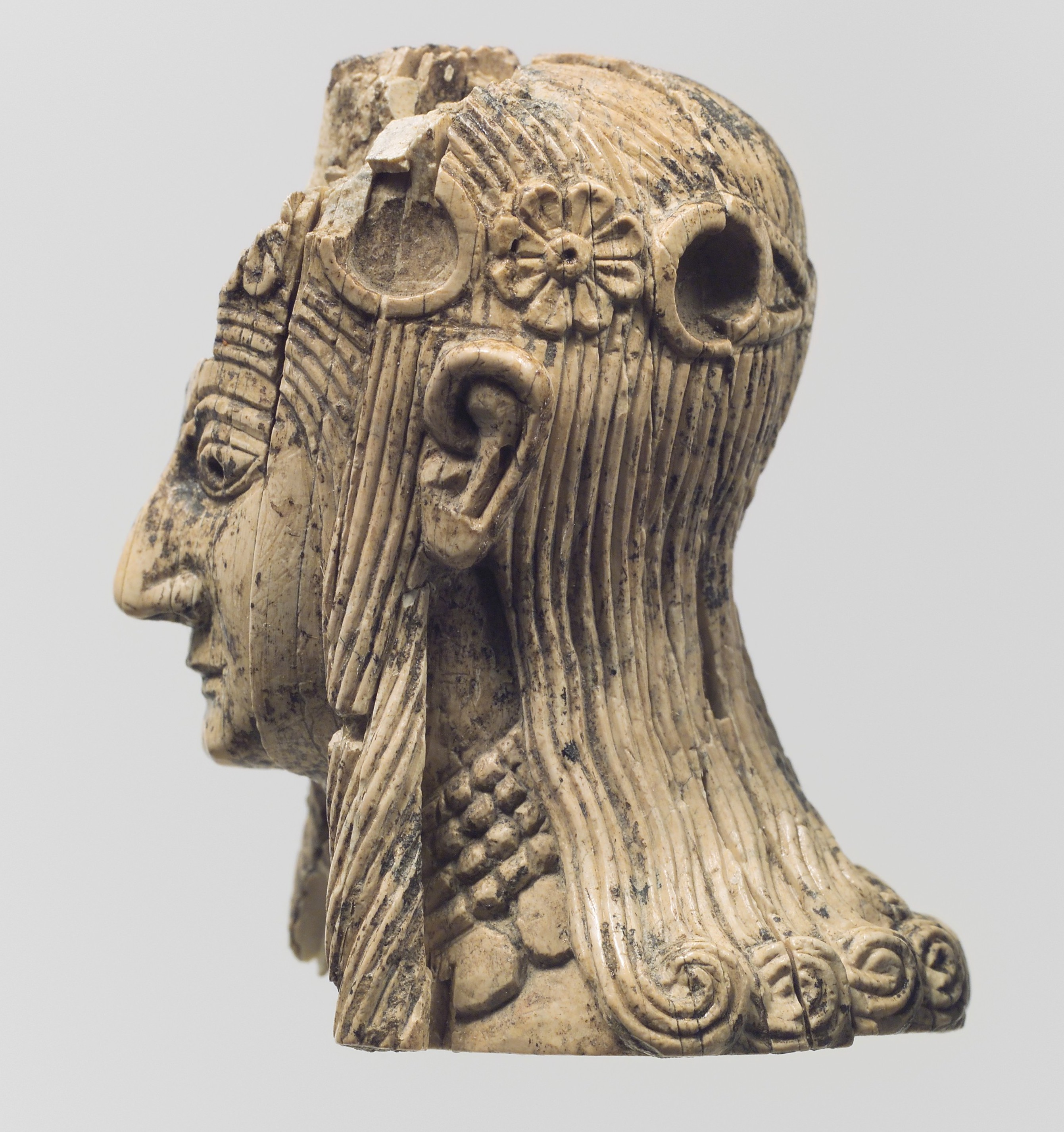
Female head, probably from a statuette, North Syrian style

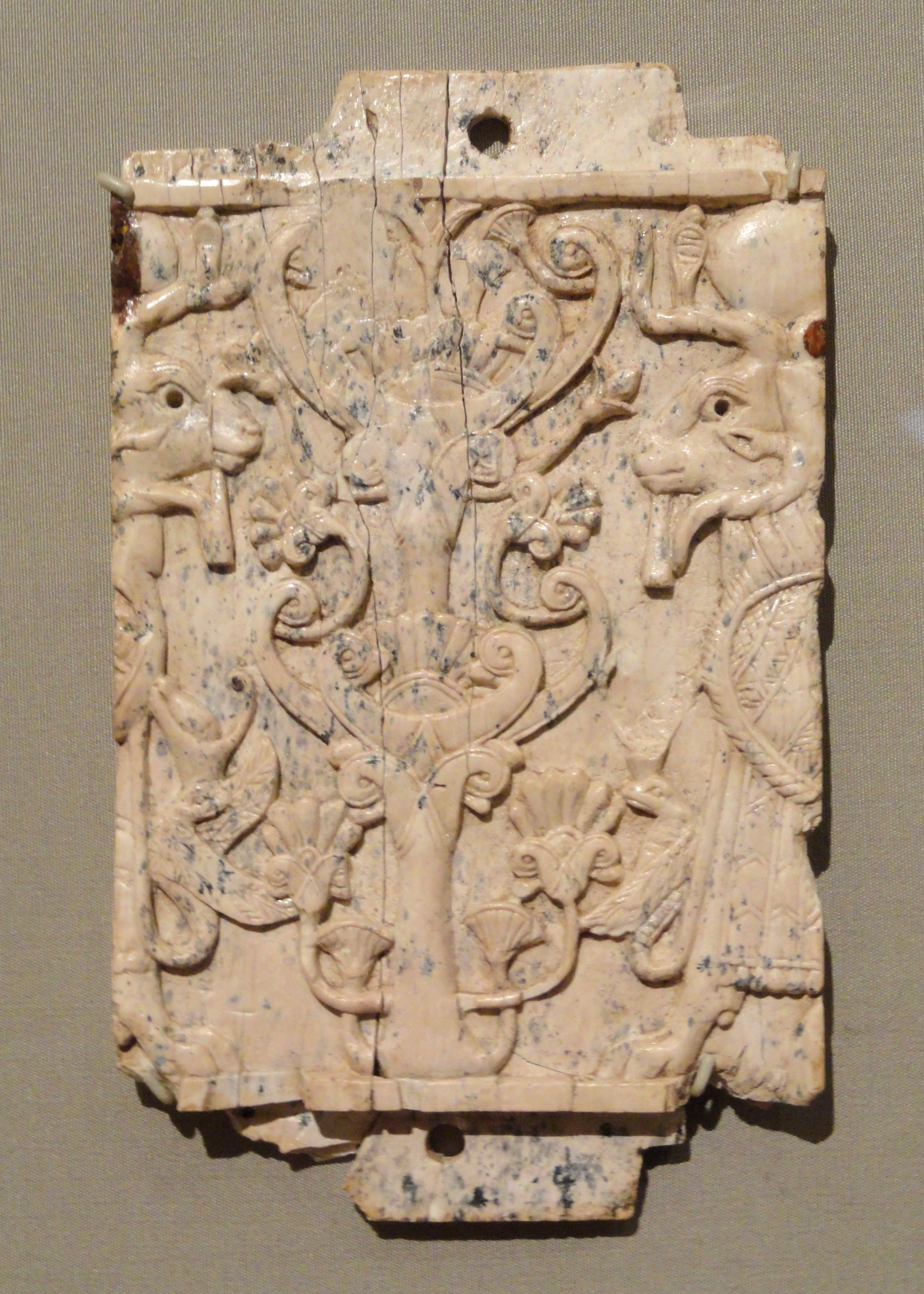
Ram-headed Sphinxes Flanking a Sacred Tree, Phoenician, Cleveland Museum of Art

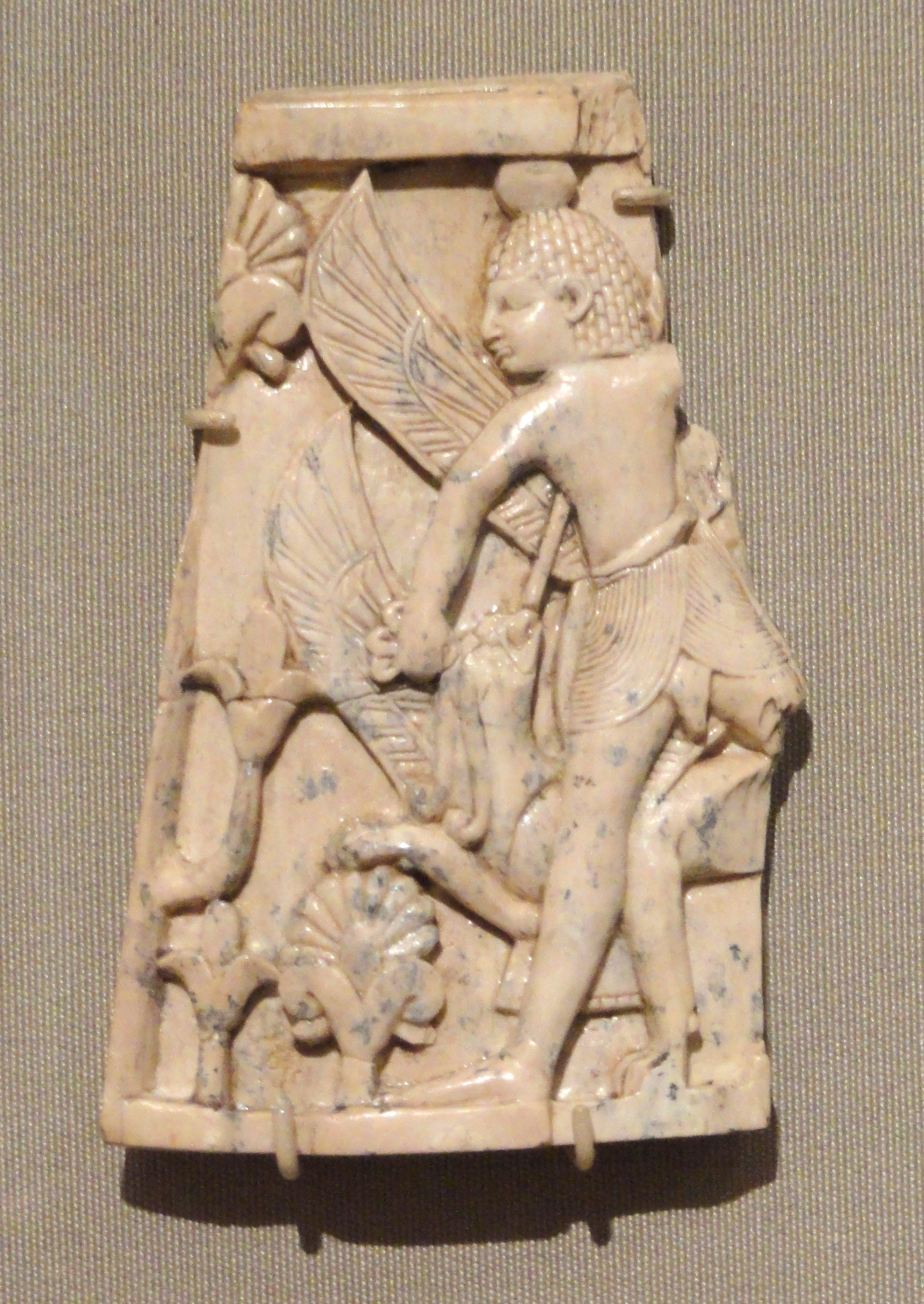
Man and Griffin in Combat, Phoenician, Cleveland Museum of Art

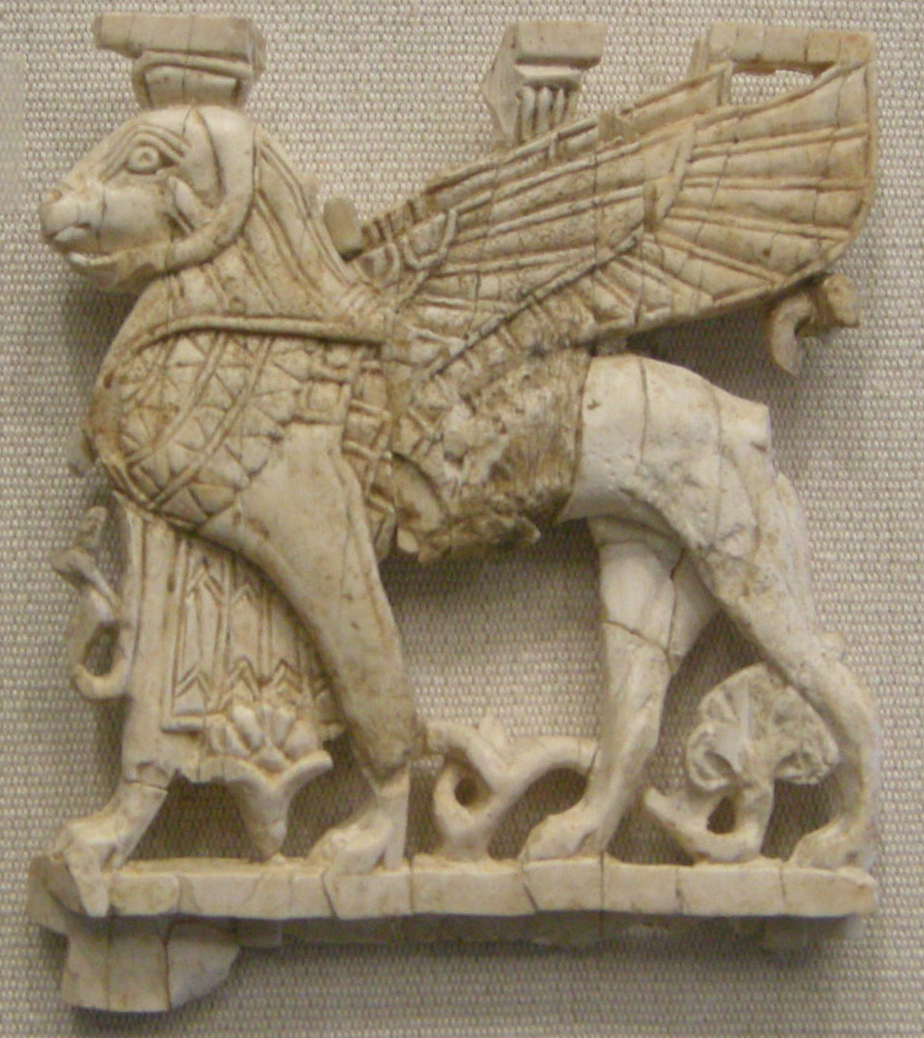
Plaque 8th–7th century BC

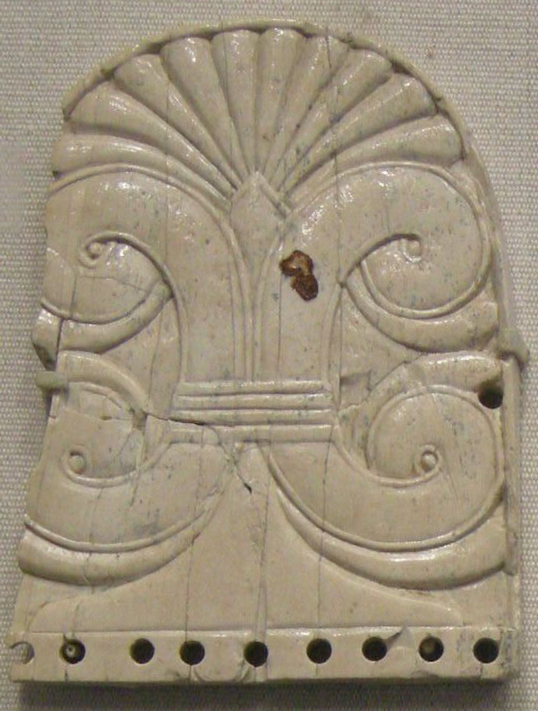
Plaque with plant motif

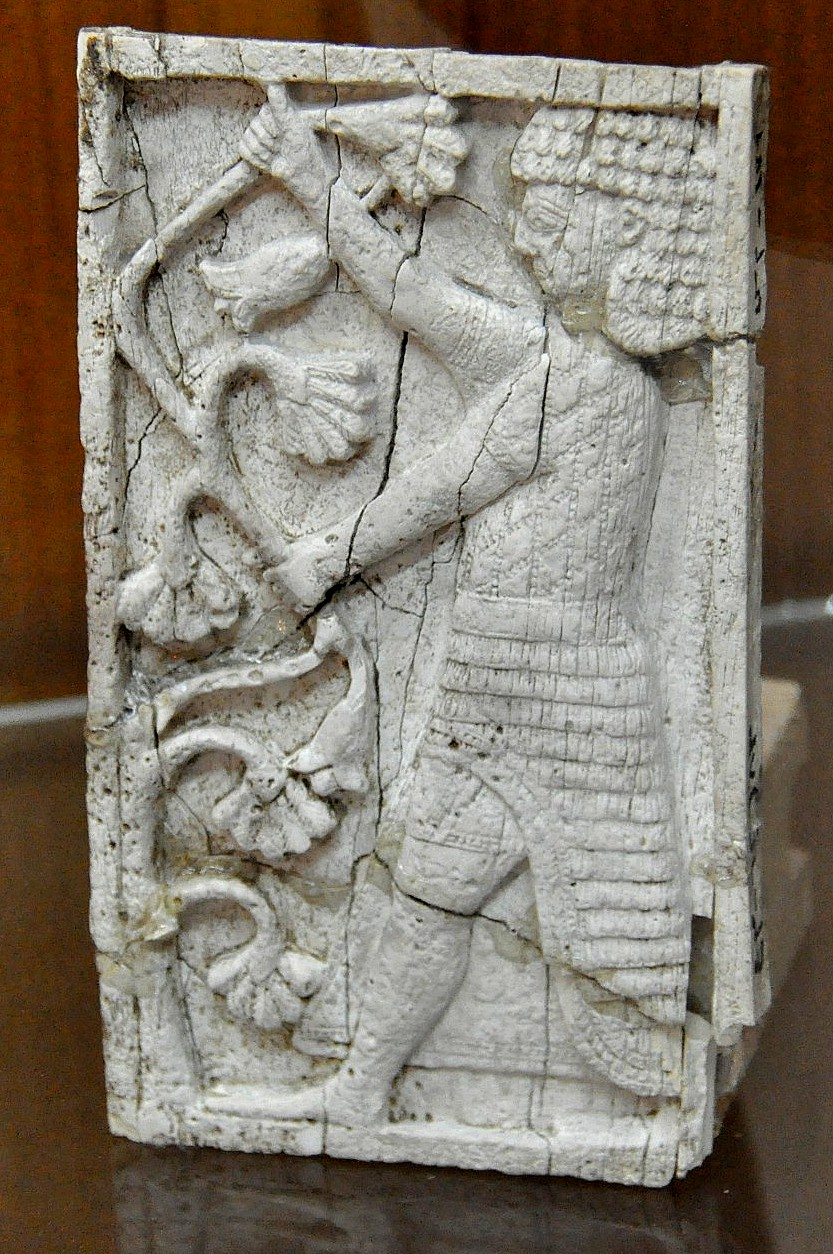
Standing man holding branches of lotus flowers.

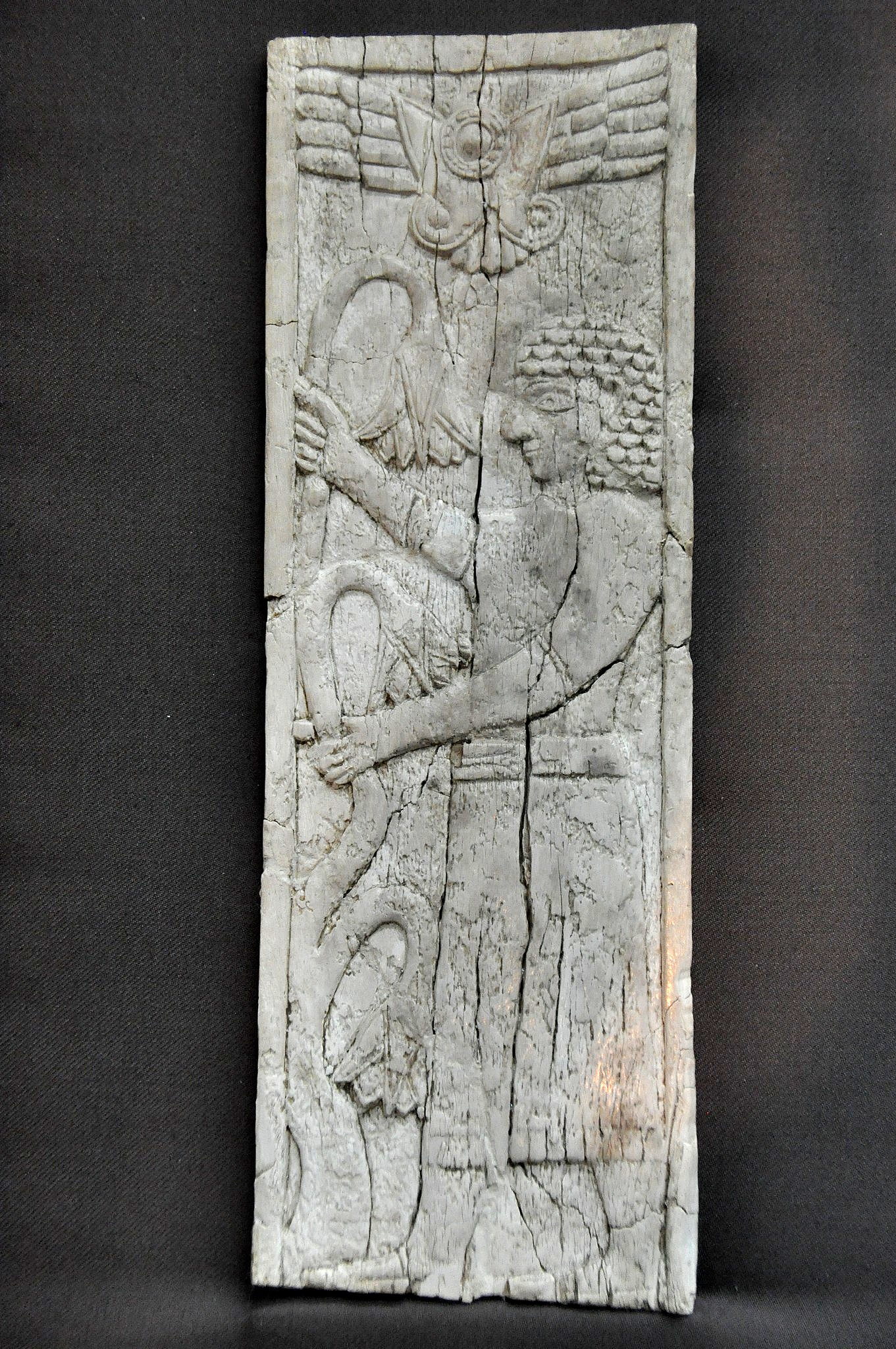
Standing man holding branches of lotus flowers. The winged god Assur appears above.

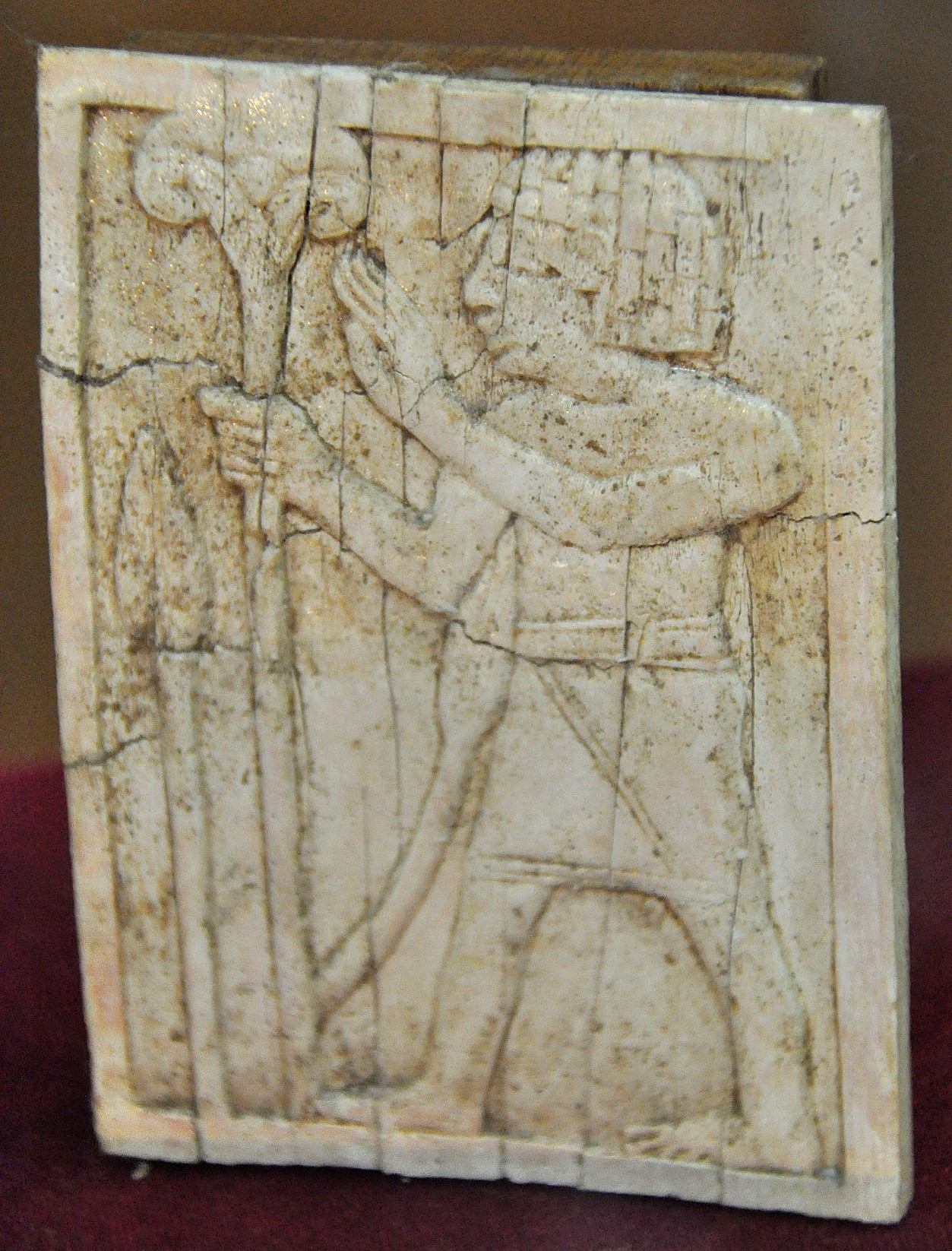
Standing man holding a lotus flower

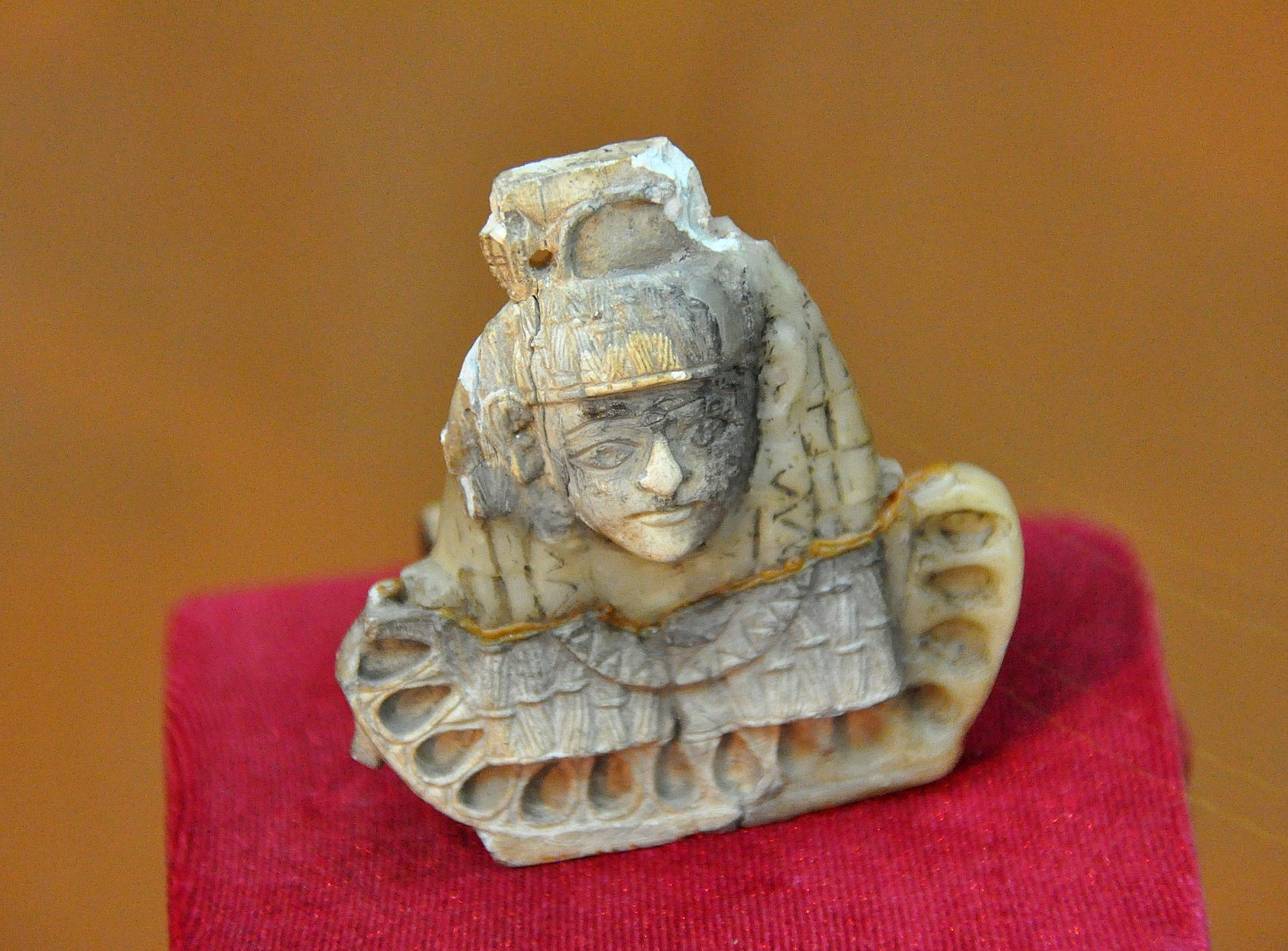
Carved ivory piece of an Egyptian woman

== Canaanite and Aramaic inscriptions ==
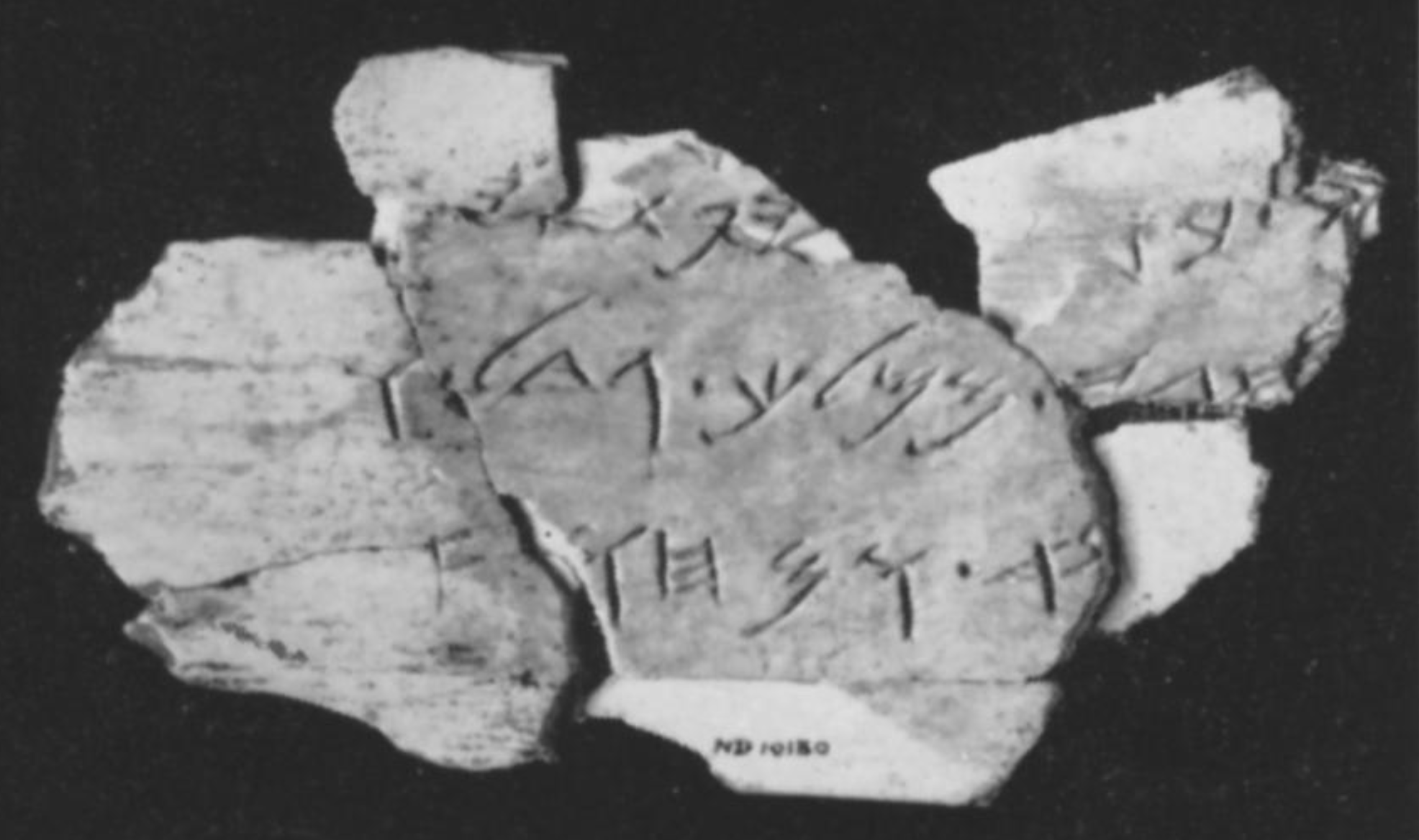
ND 10150, the most detailed Canaanite and Aramaic inscription found in the ivory collection

A number of the ivories contain Canaanite and Aramaic inscriptions – a few contain a number of words, and many more contain single letters. Some of these were found in the mid-nineteenth century by Layard and Loftus (in particular a knob inscribed "property of Milki-ram" [lmlkrm]), and more were found in 1961 by Mallowan and Oates. Of the latter, the most significant finds were excavated in "Fort Shalmaneser" in the southeast of the Nimrud site. Alan Millard published a series of these in 1962; the code "ND" is the standard excavation code for "Nimrud Documents":

- ND 10151 – a 9 cm label with three letters
- ND 10359 – a triangular plaque from a harness, with three letters
- ND 8184 – a curved strip, with six letters, and further smaller fragments
- ND 10150 – the most detailed inscription, on a fragment 9 x 5 cm, with three lines of fragmented text. This is also known as TSSI I 6, having been published in Gibson's Textbook of Syrian Semitic Inscriptions
- ND 10304 – an inscribed griffin, with five letters
- ND 10303 – an inscribed griffin, with three letters

They have been compared to the Arslan Tash ivory inscription and the Ur Box inscription.

One of the fragmentary ivories found at Nimrud carries the name of Hazael. This was probably king Hazael mentioned in the Bible.

== Collections ==
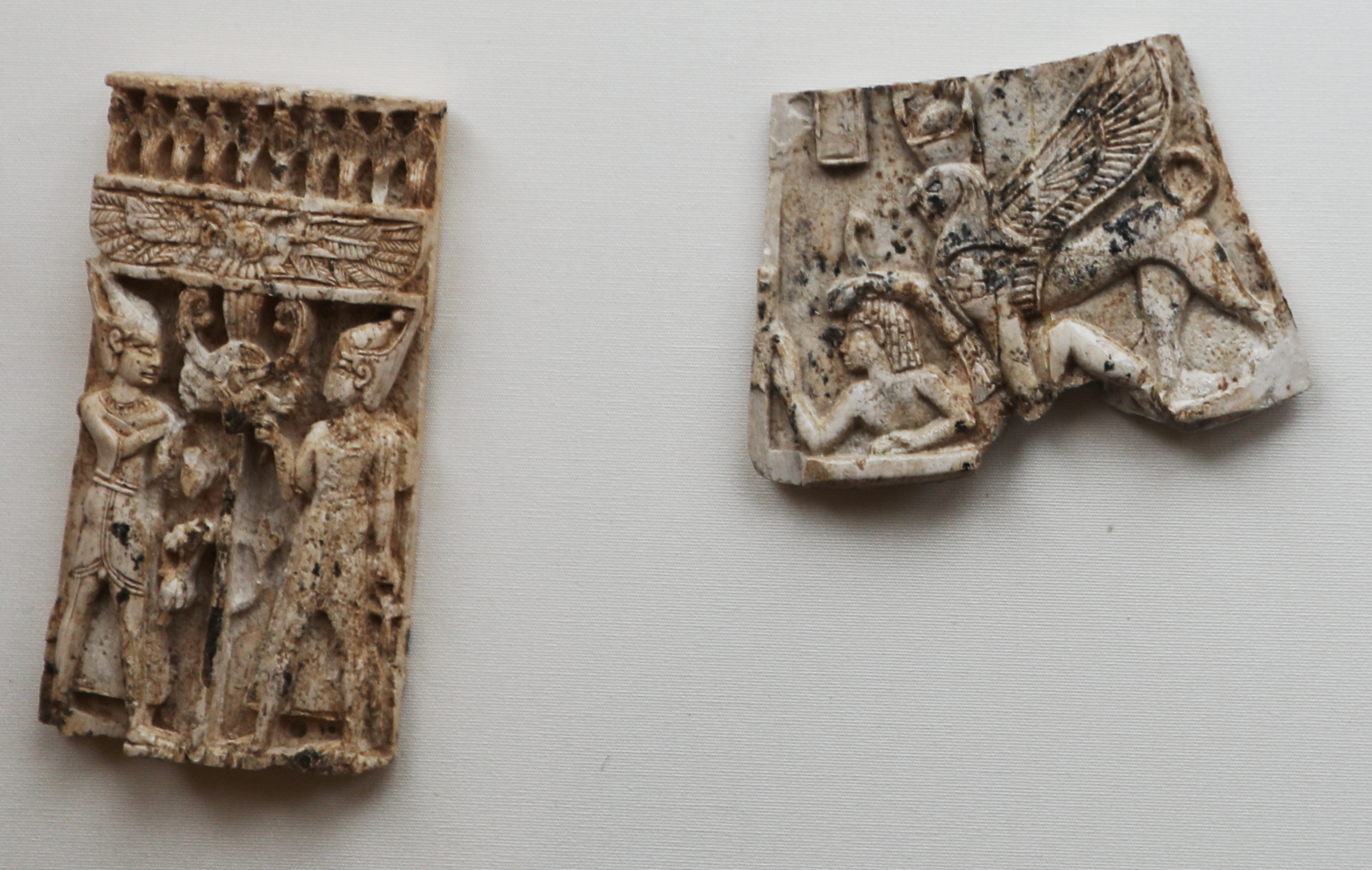
Two pieces in the collection of Birmingham Museum and Art Gallery

Ivories from Nimrud are held at a number of institutions across the world:

- British Museum, London, England: 6,000 pieces excavated by Mallowan which were formerly held at the British Institute for the Study of Iraq; as well as a number of pieces from other excavations.
- Birmingham Museum and Art Gallery 28 pieces from the British School of Archaeology in Iraq.
- National Museum of Iraq, Baghdad, Iraq.
- The Sulaymaniyah Museum, Iraqi Kurdistan. This museum houses about 30 pieces, which were excavated by Sir Max Mallowan. All of them are contained within 2 large display cases.
- Metropolitan Museum of Art, New York City
- Cleveland Museum of Art
- Erbil Civilization Museum, Iraqi Kurdistan. The museum houses 3 plaques, which were also excavated by Sir Max Mallowan between 1949 and 1963 AD. All of these plaques are on display in Hall 2 of the Museum.
- University of Melbourne, Australia: 3 pieces excavated by Mallowan.
- The California Palace of the Legion of Honor in San Francisco has a group of pieces.

== Catalogues ==
The Nimrud Ivories are being published in a series of scholarly catalogues. Many of these are available free online from the British Institute for the Study of Iraq (BISI): links here.

== See also ==
- Mona Lisa of Nimrud
- Nimrud lens
- Begram ivories
