= Dominique Collon =

Belgian academic and curator (born 1940)

- Born: 18 May 1940
- Died: 27 July 2026 (aged 86)

Academic background
- Education: Columbia University

Academic work
- Discipline: Archaeology
- Institutions: British Museum

Dominique Petronella Margaret Collon FSA (18 May 1940 - 27 July 2026) was a Belgian-born academic, author, archaeologist and former curator at the British Museum in London who has worked and travelled extensively in the Near East in Syria, Turkey and Iraq. She was an authority on cylinder seals.

Collon was born in Belgium in 1940, the daughter of Petronella and Alexandre Collon. In 1962 she was a student at the Institute of Archaeology in Oxford where she was studying for the Postgraduate Diploma in Western Asiatic Archaeology. As an archaeologist Collon excavated in Turkey under her uncle who was the Director of the British Institute at Ankara; in Kültepe with Tahsin Özgüç in 1964; and with Seton Lloyd and Charles A. Burney at Kayalıdere in 1965. She took her PhD at Columbia University in 1971 with her thesis on The Seal Impressions of Tell Atchana/Alalakh and which was published in 1975.

From 1973 to 1976, Collon was in Tunis where she excavated the mosaics of Utica and other sites and prepared the reports for publication. On her return to the United Kingdom she specialised in the study of the iconography displayed on ancient Mesopotamian and Anatolian cylinder seals. Dr Collon was with the Department of Western Asiatic Antiquities (later Ancient Near East and later still Middle East) at the British Museum from 1964 to 1968, and again from 1977 to 1988; she gained a full-time position at the Museum as curator of Western Asiatic Antiquities from 1988 until her retirement in 2005; her retirement was marked by a symposium held at Magdalen College, Oxford in June 2005. From 1979 to 2010 she was the co-editor of Iraq, the journal of the British Institute for the Study of Iraq, while from 1985 to 1989 she edited the Ancient Near East section of the Grove Dictionary of Art. Collon was a Fellow of the Society of Antiquaries of London and a corresponding member of the Deutsches Archäologisches Institut.

== Publications ==
- (With others) Sondages au flanc sud du Tell de Qala'at el-Mudiq: néolithique, chalcolithique, bronze ancien, Centre belge de recherches archéologiques à Apamée de Syrie (Brussels, Belgium), 1975.
- The Seal Impressions from Tell Atchana/Alalakh, Butzon & Bercker (Kevelaer, Germany), 1975.
- Catalogue of the Western Asiatic Seals in the British Museum: Cylinders Seals II, Akkadian-Post Akkadian-Ur III Periods, British Museum Publications (London, England), 1982.
- The Alalakh Cylinder Seals, British Archeological Reports (London, England), 1982.
- Catalogue of the Western Asiatic Seals in the British Museum: Cylinder Seals III, Isin/Larsa and Old Babylonian Periods, British Museum Publications (London, England), 1986.
- First Impressions: Cylinder Seals in the Ancient Near East, British Museum Press (London, England), 1987, University of Chicago Press (Chicago, IL), 1988, revised edition, British Museum Press (London, England), 2005.
- Near Eastern Seals, University of California Press (Berkeley, CA), 1990.
- Ancient Near Eastern Art, University of California Press (Berkeley, CA), 1995.
- (Editor and contributor) 7,000 Years of Seals, British Museum Press (London, England), 1997.
- Catalogue of the Western Asiatic Seals in the British Museum: Cylinder Seals IV, Neo-Assyrian and Neo-Babylonian Periods, British Museum Press (London, England), 2001.

Collon has also contributed to books by others, including Art and Empire: Treasures from Assyria in the British Museum, Harry N. Abrams (New York, NY), 1995; to reference books; and shorter publications. She was the co-editor of the academic journal Iraq (1979—2010).
