= Barbara Parker-Mallowan =

English archaeologist, Assyriologist, and epigraphist (1908-1993)

Barbara Parker-Mallowan OBE
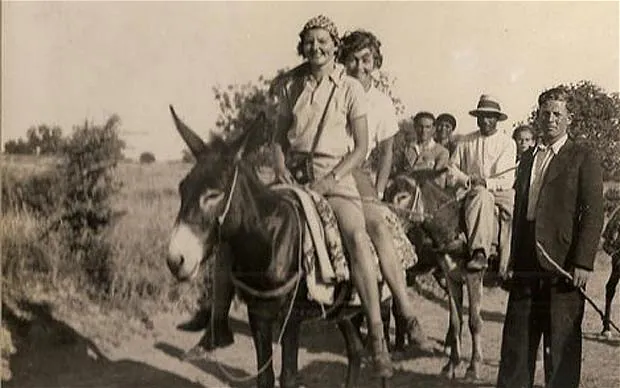
- Barbara Parker-Mallowan sitting on a donkey behind Rachel Maxwell-Hyslop, c. 1938 in Cyprus
- Born: Barbara Hastings Parker; 14 July 1908
- Died: 21 November 1993 (aged 85); Wallingford, Oxfordshire, England
- Spouses: Sir Max Mallowan (m. 1977; died 1978)
- Scientific career
- Institutions: British School of Archaeology in Iraq

Barbara Hastings Parker-Mallowan, Lady Mallowan, OBE (née Parker; 14 July 1908 – 21 November 1993) was an English archaeologist, Assyriologist, and epigraphist who specialised in cylinder seals.

== Life and work ==
Barbara Parker was born on 14 July 1908 to Reginald Francis Parker (1871–1946) and had a younger brother John Manwaring Parker (1911–1979). She worked in Baghdad and succeeded Robert Hamilton (1905–1995) as the secretary and librarian of the British School of Archaeology in Iraq from 1950 to 1961. She was its president from 1983 until her death in 1993.

Her first assignment from director Max Mallowan was to build a "dig house" at Nimrud, which she did and maintained for many years. She was typically the only staff member to reside in Baghdad throughout the school year, from October to June.

She was also a lecturer in Mesopotamian archaeology at the Institute of Archaeology, London, from 1961. She was not only involved in the excavations of Nimrud under Max Mallowan, but also at Tell al-Rimah and Tell Brak.

In the 1962 New Year Honours, she was appointed an Officer of the Order of the British Empire (OBE) in recognition of her service as secretary and librarian of the British School of Archaeology in Iraq.

== Personal life ==
Parker married Max Mallowan and became Lady Mallowan in 1977, following the death of his first wife Agatha Christie.

== Selected works ==
- Parker, Barbara (1949). "Cylinder Seals from Palestine". Iraq. 11 (1): 1–43. doi:10.2307/4241686. JSTOR 4241686.
- Parker, Barbara (1954). "The Nimrud Tablets, 1952: Business Documents". Iraq. 16 (1): 29–58. doi:10.2307/4199582. JSTOR 4199582.
- Parker, Barbara (1955). "Excavations at Nimrud, 1949-1953: Seals and Seal Impressions". Iraq. 17 (2): 93–125. doi:10.2307/4241722. JSTOR 4241722.
- Parker, Barbara (1957). "Nimrud Tablets, 1956: Economic and Legal Texts from the Nabu Temple". Iraq. 19 (2): 125–138. doi:10.2307/4199624. JSTOR 4199624.
- Parker, Barbara (1961). "Administrative Tablets from the North-West Palace, Nimrud". Iraq. 23 (1): 15–67. doi:10.2307/4199695. JSTOR 4199695.
- Parker, Barbara (1962). "Seals and Seal Impressions from the Nimrud Excavations, 1955-58". Iraq. 24 (1): 26–40. doi:10.2307/4199710. JSTOR 4199710.
- Parker, Barbara (1963). "Economic Tablets from the Temple of Mamu at Balawat". Iraq. 25 (1): 86–103. doi:10.2307/4199734. JSTOR 4199734.
- Parker, Barbara (1977). "Middle Assyrian Seal Impressions from Tell al Rimah". Iraq. 39 (2): 257–268. doi:10.2307/4200074. JSTOR 4200074.
