= Basrah Museum =

- متحف البصرة
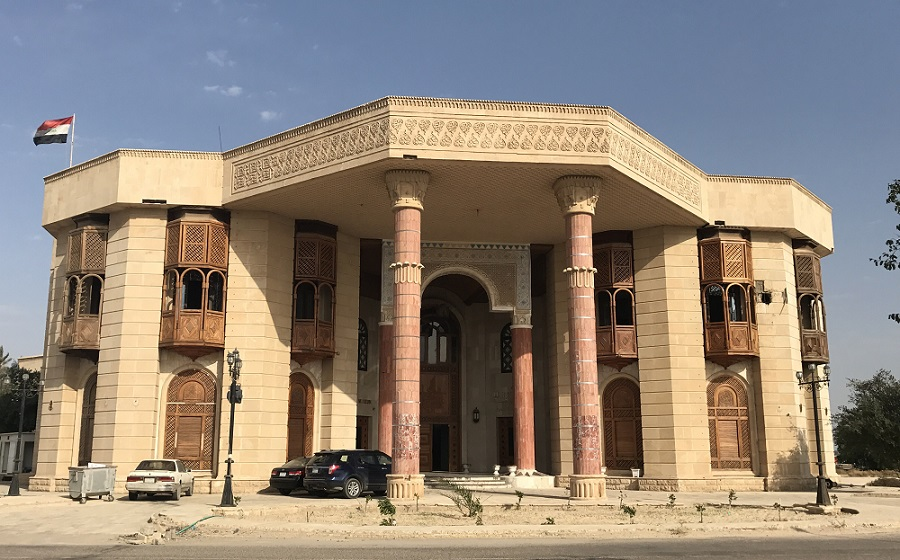
- Exterior of the former palace which now houses the museum
- Former name: Palace of Saddam Hussein
- Established: September 2016
- Location: Basra, Iraq
- Coordinates: 30.4974146°N 47.8611017°E
- Type: Museum
- Director: Qahtan Alabeed

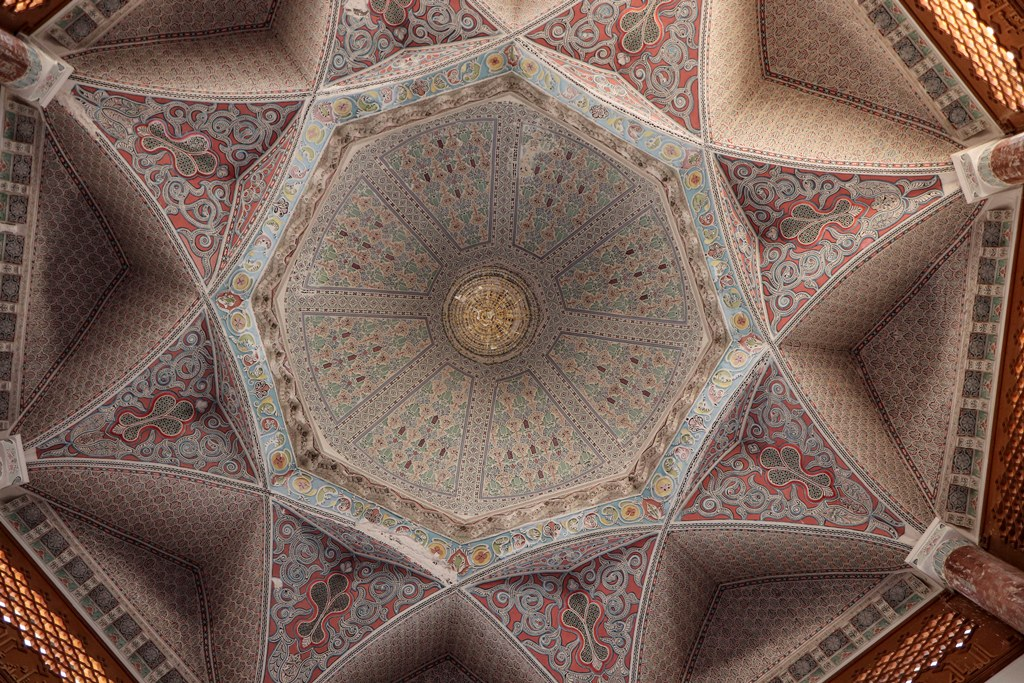
Entrance Dome

The Basrah Museum (Arabic: متحف البصرة) is a museum in the Iraqi city of Basra, It is located on the banks of the Shatt al-Arab some 3 km south‐east of Basra’s historic city centre. Housed in a former palace of Saddam Hussein, its collection is related to Mesopotamian, Babylonian, Persian civilisations, as well as the history of the city itself. Basrah Museum opened its doors to the public in March 2019. The Director of the Basrah Antiquities & Heritage is Qahtan Al Abeed, who has managed the project from the start with the cooperation of the State Board of Antiquities & Heritage and the Ministry of Culture and with support from the UK Friends of Basrah Museum (FOBM).

== History ==
The museum was closed in 1991, when it was among nine museums looted by mobs opposed to Saddam Hussein at the close of the first Gulf War. The remaining collection was moved to the National Museum in Baghdad where it was kept safe in a sealed store during the 2003 invasion of Iraq.

After the invasion, the palace grounds were occupied by the British Army. In 2008, the Iraqi Army and National Police (now Federal police), along the United States Army took over the area and used it as a base of operations. During 2008, Iraqi and U.S. forces executed numerous combat operations from this base to defeat the Mahdi Army. After the British withdrawal in 2008, it was proposed to the Iraqi government that the palace be converted into a museum. Two years later, the government agreed to fund $3 million of the $3.5 million needed.

The Basrah Museum opened its first Gallery of the Museum in September 2016, showcasing items from 300BC to the 18th century, such as pottery vases, coffins, tiles and silver coins from Basrah. The FOBM is the organisation that raised the funds for the first gallery's installation through generous corporate and individual donations. FOBM received a UK Cultural Protection Fund [CPF] Grant award in December 2016, managed by the British Council in partnership with the Department of Digital, Culture, Media and Sport to support the completion of the new Basrah Museum. The London-based British Museum was also one of the organisations which supported the Basrah Museum at the start of the project in 2010.

The museum officially opened its doors to the public in March 2019 with three new galleries: Babylon, Sumer and Assyrian showcasing around 1,200 items. With the assistance of the Iraq Museum and the Basrah Museum thousands of artefacts dating back as far as BCE 6,000 are back on display in the southern province. These include artefacts from the original museum looted in 1991 that are now on display in the Basrah Gallery.

In 2023, the museum converted its courtyard into the "Garden of Civilization" with replicas of the Lion of Babylon and an Assyrian Lamassu. A replica of the Assyrian Bull of Nimrud, which was destroyed in 2015 by ISIS, was placed at the entrance of the museum in 2024, after it had been on display in Rome and at the UNESCO headquarters.

== Building ==
The 2,500 square meter wide museum building is designed as Ottoman architecture featuring Basrian shanasheels. A domed foyer opens into four halls on the ground floor accommodating the museum galleries and an upper floor with further four smaller halls.

== Collections ==
The museum houses over 2500 artefacts spread across four galleries.

- In the Assyrian Gallery, most objects date to the Neo-Assyrian Empire (9th‐8th century BCE).
- The Babylon Gallery features items from the entire Babylon period with a focus on the Kassites (c. 1600‐1100 BCE).
- The Sumer Gallery displays material from the Halaf culture (5500 BCE) to the Third Dynasty of Ur (c. 2000 BCE).
- The items in the Basrah Gallery stem mainly from the Islamic period, consisting mainly of pottery, glass vessels, terracotta figurines and a large numismatic collection including Hellenistic coins.

In the outdoor compound next to the museum there are two reed guesthouses (mudhifs) and a series of traditional boats typical of the Mesopotamian Marshes.

== Gallery ==
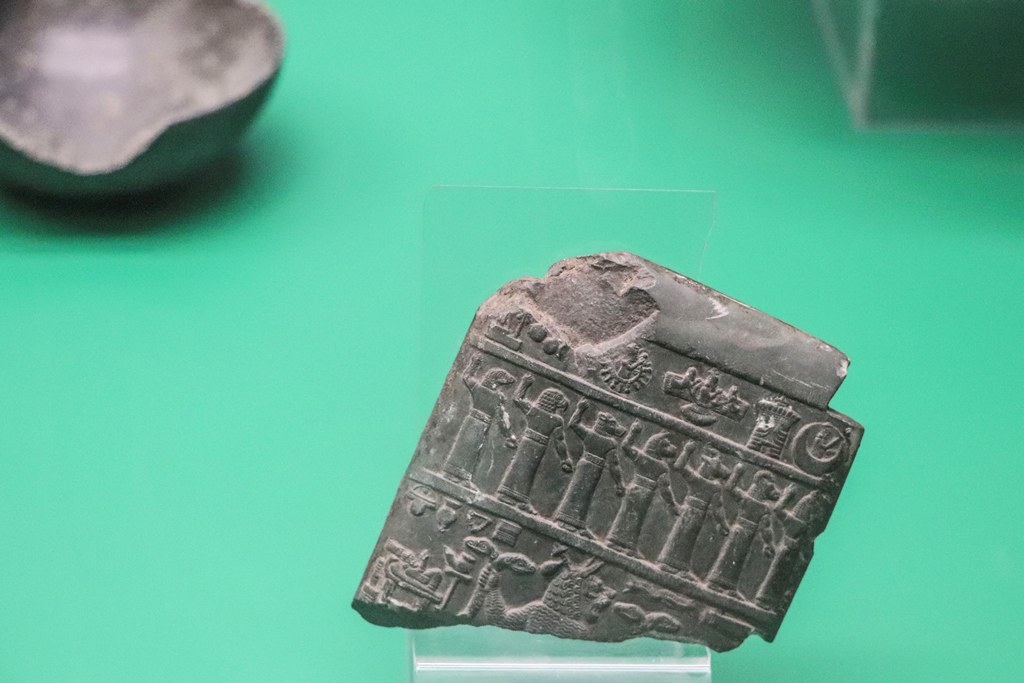
Assyrian Gallery: Stone Lamashtu plaque

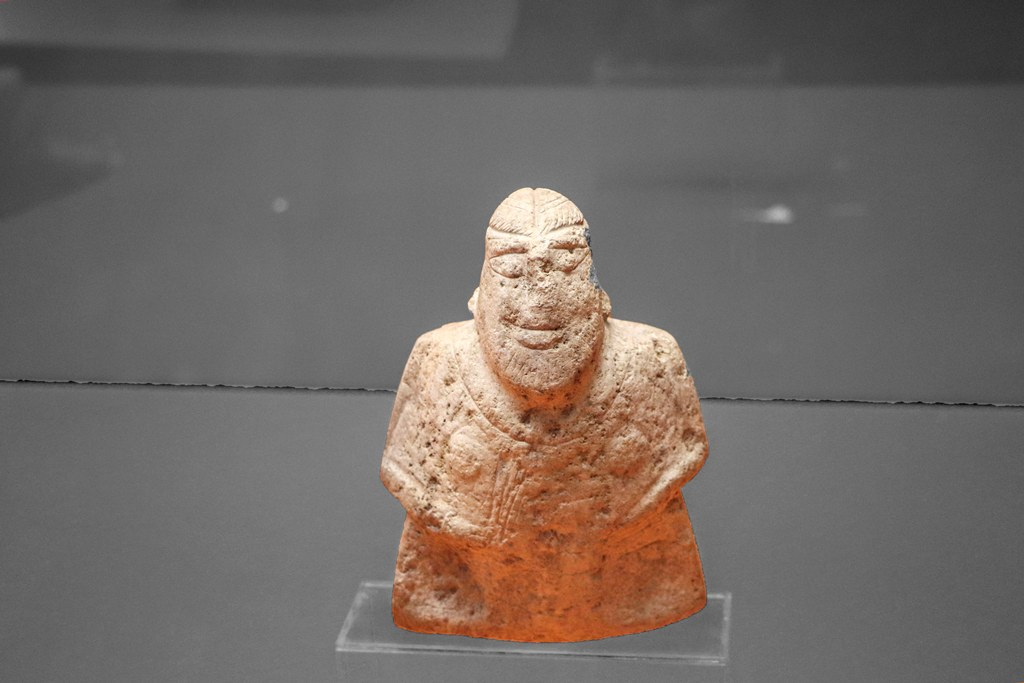
Babylon Gallery: Statue of man of Tell al-Rimah

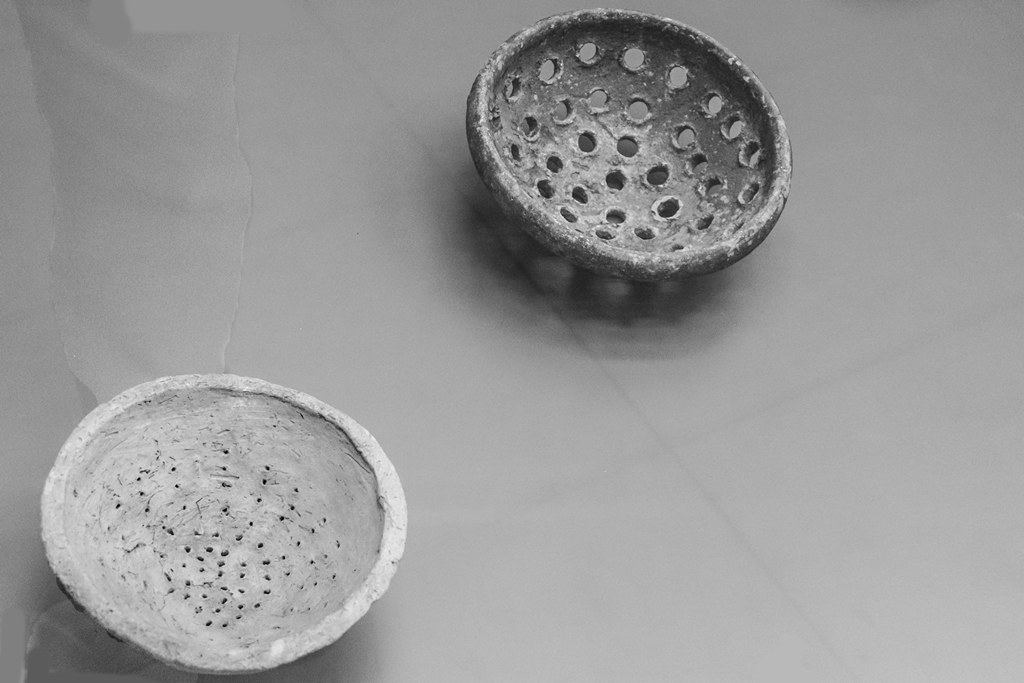
Sumer Gallery: Two pottery strainers

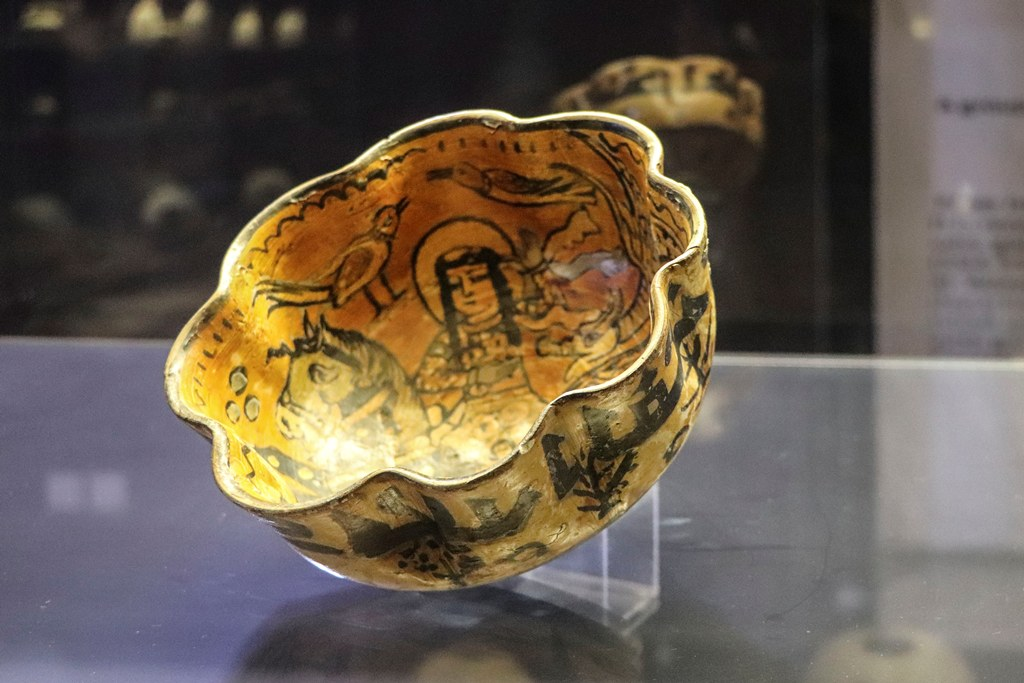
Basrah Gallery: Painted pottery vessel

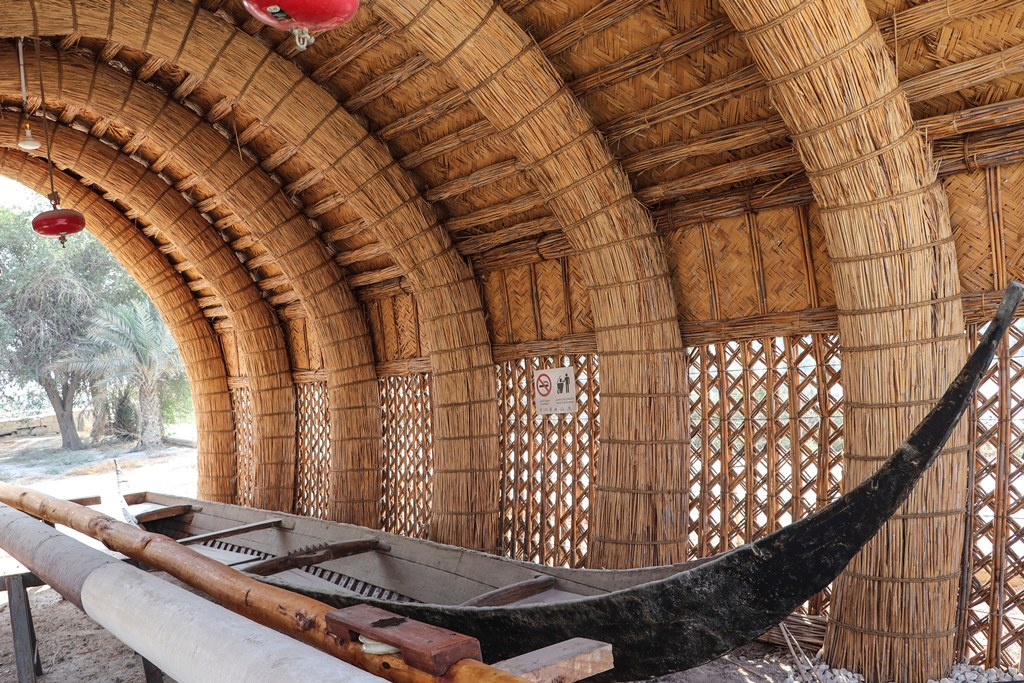
Outdoor compound: Reed guesthouse with traditional boat

== See also ==
- List of museums in Iraq
