= Max Mallowan =

British archaeologist (1904–1978)

Sir Max Mallowan CBE FBA FSA
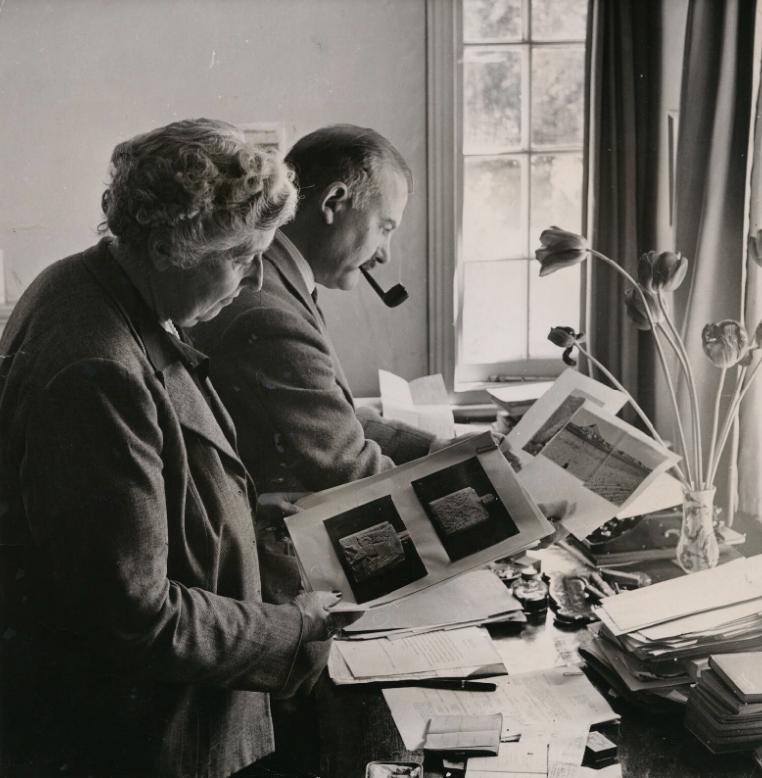
- Mallowan and Agatha Christie in 1950
- Born: Max Edgar Lucien Mallowan; 6 May 1904; Wandsworth, London, England
- Died: 19 August 1978 (aged 74); Greenway, Devon, England
- Resting place: Church of St Mary, Cholsey, Oxfordshire, England
- Education: New College, Oxford
- Spouses: Agatha Christie (m. 1930; died 1976) Barbara Hastings Parker (m. 1977)
- Scientific career
- Fields: Archaeologist
- Workplaces: University of London; All Souls College, Oxford

Sir Max Edgar Lucien Mallowan (6 May 1904 – 19 August 1978) was a British archaeologist specializing in the Ancient Near East. Having studied classics at Oxford University, he was trained for archaeology by Leonard Woolley at Ur and Reginald Campbell Thompson at Nineveh. He then directed a number of archaeological expeditions sponsored by the British Museum and the British School of Archaeology in Iraq. He was the second husband of Agatha Christie, having met her during the excavation at Ur in 1930. He served in the Royal Air Force Volunteer Reserve during the Second World War, and then entered academia. He was Professor of Western Asiatic Archaeology at the University of London (1947–1962) and a fellow of All Souls College, Oxford (1962–1971).

== Early life and education ==
Born Edgar Mallowan on 6 May 1904 in Wandsworth, London, England, to Frederick Mallowan, a businessman who had served with the Austrian horse artillery, and his wife Marguerite (née Duvivier), whose mother was mezzo-soprano singer Marthe Duvivier. His father's family was from Austria. He was educated at Rokeby School, a boys’ preparatory school, and Lancing College, then an all-boys independent boarding school (where he was a contemporary of Evelyn Waugh and Humphrey Trevelyan). He ended school at 17 to matriculate into the University of Oxford, where he studied literae humaniores (i.e. classics) at New College, Oxford. He achieved a Fourth-class honours in Mods in 1923 and third-class honours in Greats in 1925. Among others, he was taught by H. A. L. Fisher, Percy Gardner and Gilbert Murray.

== Career ==
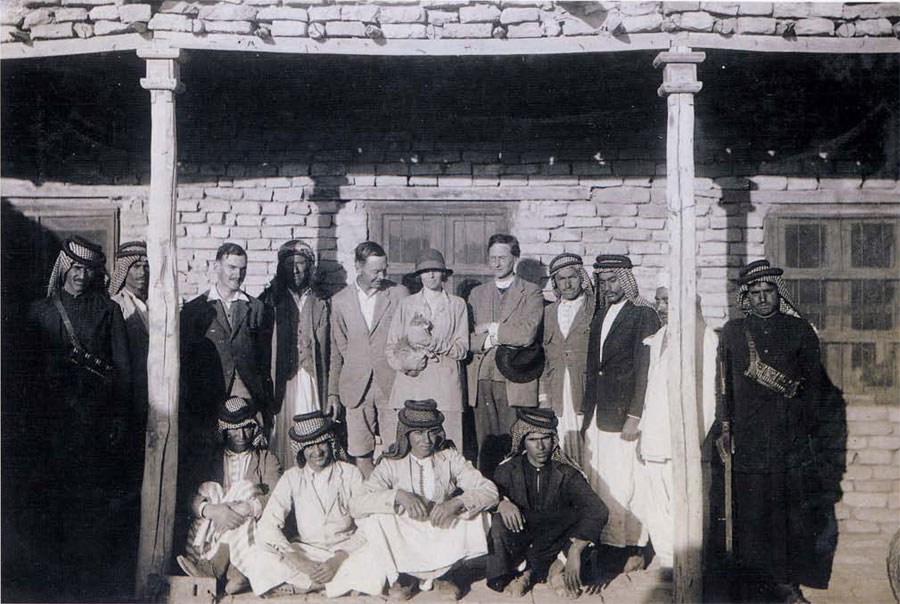
Mallowan (third from left) with the 1928-29 Ur expedition staff.

=== Early archaeology career ===
It was by means of H. A. L. Fisher, the warden of his college, that Mallowan was introduced to D. G. Hogarth and then to Leonard Woolley. He worked first as an apprentice to Woolley at the archaeological site of Ur (1925–1930), which was thought to be the capital of Mesopotamian civilization. It was at the Ur site, in 1930, that he first met Agatha Christie, the famous author, whom he married the same year. During his time at the archaeological site, he and his new wife invited British author and explorer Ronald Codrai and his wife Pamela to join them at Ur. Codrai was on his honeymoon but was asked to write an article about Ur, for which Mallowan helped to get him access. In 1932, he spent a brief time working at Nineveh with Reginald Campbell Thompson, where he made a 21 metre-deep shaft down to natural level in the Kuyunjiq tell.

Mallowan then became a field director for a series of expeditions managed jointly by the British Museum and the British School of Archaeology in Iraq. His excavations included the prehistoric village at Tell Arpachiyah, and the sites at Chagar Bazar and Tell Brak in the Upper Khabur area (Syria). He was also the first to excavate archaeological sites in the valley of the river Balikh, to the west of the Khabur basin. In December 1933, he was elected a Fellow of the Society of Antiquaries (FSA).

=== War service ===
After the beginning of the Second World War he served with the Royal Air Force Volunteer Reserve in North Africa, being based for part of 1943 at the ancient city of Sabratha in Libya. He was commissioned as a pilot officer on probation in the Administrative and Special Duties Branch on 11 February 1941, promoted flying officer on 18 August 1941, flight lieutenant on 1 April 1943 and for some time he also had the rank of wing commander. His first role with the RAF was as a liaison officer with allied forces and, later in the war, as a civilian affairs officer in North Africa. He resigned his commission on 10 February 1954, but was permitted to retain the rank of wing commander during retirement.

=== Academic career ===
After the war, in 1947, he was appointed Professor of Western Asiatic Archaeology at the University of London. He also served as director of the British School of Archaeology in Iraq from 1947 to 1961. He directed the resumption of its work at Nimrud (previously excavated by A. H. Layard), which he published in Nimrud and its Remains (2 volumes, 1966). Mallowan gave an account of his work in his book Twenty-five Years Of Mesopotamian Discovery (1956) and his wife Agatha Christie described his work in Syria in her book Come, Tell Me How You Live (1946). In 1954, he was elected a Fellow of the British Academy (FBA), the United Kingdom's national academy for the humanities and social sciences. He served as vice-president of the British Academy from 1961 to 1962. Having left the University of London, he was elected a fellow of All Souls College, Oxford in 1962. This was a senior research fellowship that omitted the requirement to teach and so he could concentrate on writing up the excavations at Nimrud.

== Personal life ==
Agatha Christie died in 1976; the next year, Mallowan married Barbara Hastings Parker, an archaeologist, who had been his epigraphist at Nimrud and Secretary of the British School of Archaeology in Iraq.

He died on 19 August 1978, aged 74, at Greenway House in Devon and was interred alongside his first wife, Agatha Christie, in the churchyard of St Mary's, Cholsey in Oxfordshire. His estate was valued at £524,054. His second wife, Barbara, died in Wallingford in 1993, at the age of 85.

== Honours ==
Mallowan was appointed Commander of the Order of the British Empire in the 1960 Queen's Birthday Honours, and knighted in 1968. He gave the 1969 Albert Reckitt Archaeological Lecture.

== In popular culture ==
In 2019, Mallowan was played by Jonah Hauer-King for the movie Agatha and the Curse of Ishtar.

In 2022, Mallowan was played by Lucian Msamati in the British-American movie See How They Run.

== Selected works ==
- Mallowan, M. E. L. (1956). Twenty-five years of Mesopotamian discovery (1932-1956). London: British School of Archaeology in Iraq.
- Mallowan, M. E. L. (1965). Early Mesopotamia And Iran. The Library of Early Civilizations. London: Thames and Hudson.
- Mallowan, M. E. L. (1966). Nimrud and its Remains. London: Collins on behalf of The British School of Archaeology in Iraq.
- Mallowan, M. E. L. (1970). "VIII: The development of cities: from Al-'Ubaid to the end of Uruk". In Edwards, I. E. S.; Gadd, C. J.; Hammond, N. G. L. (eds.). Prolegomena and Prehistory. The Cambridge Ancient History. Vol. I. Cambridge: Cambridge University Press. pp. 327–462.
- Mallowan, Max; Davies, Leri Glynne (1970). Ivories in Assyrian Style, Commentary, Catalogue and Plates. London: British School of Archaeology in Iraq.

== See also ==
- Nimrud ivories
