= Navar =

Navar or Navor or Naver (Persian: نوار or ناور) may refer to:

- Navar, Hamadan (نوار - Navār)
- Navar, West Azerbaijan (ناور - Nāvar)

== See also ==
- Nawar (disambiguation)
