= Garmak =

Garmak may refer to:

- Grimacco, Italy
- Garmak, Hamadan, a village in Hamadan Province, Iran
- Garmak, Jajrom, a village in North Khorasan Province, Iran
- Garmak, Maneh and Samalqan, a village in North Khorasan Province, Iran
- Garmak, Qazvin, a village in Qazvin Province, Iran
- Garmak, Razavi Khorasan, a village in Razavi Khorasan Province, Iran
