= Yengi Qaleh, Hamadan =

Yengi Qaleh ينگي قلعه
- Village
- Location within Iran
- Coordinates: 35°21′36″N 49°03′40″E
- Country: Iran
- Province: Hamadan
- County: Razan
- Bakhsh: Central
- Rural District: Razan

Population (2006)
  - Total: 468
- Time zone: UTC+3:30 (IRST)
  - Summer (DST): UTC+4:30 (IRDT)

Yengi Qaleh (Persian: ينگي قلعه, also Romanized as Yengī Qal‘eh; also known as Yengeh Qal‘eh) is a village in Razan Rural District, in the Central District of Razan County, Hamadan Province, Iran. At the 2006 census, its population was 468, in 111 families.
