= Horian =

Horian or Haryan or Hariyan (Persian: هريان) may refer to:

- Haryan, Hamadan
- Horian, Qazvin
