= Laleh Dan =

Village in Hamadan province, Iran

Laleh Dan Persian: لاله دان
- Village
- Location within Iran
- Coordinates: 35°34′51″N 48°57′15″E
- Country: Iran
- Province: Hamadan
- County: Razan
- District: Central
- Rural District: Kharqan

Population (2016)
  - Total: 369
- Time zone: UTC+3:30 (IRST)

Laleh Dan (Persian: لاله دان) (Note: Also romanized as Lāleh Dān) is a village in Kharqan Rural District of the Central District in Razan County, Hamadan province, Iran.

== Demographics ==
=== Population ===
At the time of the 2006 National Census, the village's population was 363 in 89 households. The following census in 2011 counted 397 people in 111 households. The 2016 census measured the population of the village as 369 people in 116 households.
