= Jerbanlu =

Village in Hamadan province, Iran

Jerbanlu Persian: جربانلو
- Village
- Location within Iran
- Coordinates: 35°35′11″N 48°55′42″E
- Country: Iran
- Province: Hamadan
- County: Razan
- District: Central
- Rural District: Kharqan

Population (2016)
  - Total: 390
- Time zone: UTC+3:30 (IRST)

Jerbanlu (Persian: جربانلو) (Note: Also romanized as Jerbanloo and Jerbānlū; also known as Jerbān, Jeryānlū, and Jīrbānlū) is a village in Kharqan Rural District of the Central District in Razan County, Hamadan province, Iran.

== Demographics ==
=== Population ===
At the time of the 2006 National Census, the village's population was 514 in 125 households. The following census in 2011 counted 499 people in 133 households. The 2016 census measured the population of the village as 390 people in 119 households.
