= Jamishlu =

Village in Hamadan province, Iran

Jamishlu Persian: جاميشلو
- Village
- Location within Iran
- Coordinates: 35°14′45″N 48°58′33″E
- Country: Iran
- Province: Hamadan
- County: Razan
- District: Central
- Rural District: Razan

Population (2016)
  - Total: 846
- Time zone: UTC+3:30 (IRST)

Jamishlu (Persian: جاميشلو) (Note: Also romanized as Jamīshloo and Jamīshlū; also known as Jāmeshlū and Jāmshlū) is a village in Razan Rural District of the Central District in Razan County, Hamadan province, Iran.

== Demographics ==
=== Language ===
The people of Jamishlu speak Azeri Turkish.

=== Population ===
At the time of the 2006 National Census, the village's population was 999 in 250 households. The following census in 2011 counted 1,092 people in 313 households. The 2016 census measured the population of the village as 846 people in 280 households.

== Notable people ==
- Ghorbanali Namdari, one of the famous poets of Iran
