= Kharqan =

Kharqan (Persian: خرقان) may refer to:

- Kharqan District, in Markazi province, Iran
- Kharqan Rural District (disambiguation)
