= Vafs =

Vafs (Persian: وفس) may refer to:

- Vafs, Hamadan
- Vafs, Markazi
