= Garmak, Hamadan =

Garmak گرمك
- Village
- Location within Iran
- Coordinates: 35°32′25″N 49°05′57″E
- Country: Iran
- Province: Hamadan
- County: Razan
- Bakhsh: Central
- Rural District: Kharqan

Population (2006)
  - Total: 201
- Time zone: UTC+3:30 (IRST)
  - Summer (DST): UTC+4:30 (IRDT)

Garmak (Persian: گرمك) is a village in Kharqan Rural District, in the Central District of Razan County, Hamadan Province, Iran. At the 2006 census, its population was 201, in 43 families.
