= Farsajin =

Farsajin or Farsijin or Farsagin or Farsejin or Farsjin or Parsadzhin (Persian: فارسجين) may refer to:

- Farsejin, Hamadan
- Farsajin, Qazvin
