= Ommatlar =

Village in Hamadan province, Iran

Ommatlar Persian: امتلر
- Village
- Location within Iran
- Coordinates: 35°26′09″N 48°58′04″E
- Country: Iran
- Province: Hamadan
- County: Razan
- District: Central
- Rural District: Razan

Population (2016)
  - Total: 2,126
- Time zone: UTC+3:30 (IRST)

Ommatlar (Persian: امتلر) (Note: Also Romanized as Amatlar and Ammatlar) is a village in Razan Rural District of the Central District in Razan County, Hamadan province, Iran.

== Demographics ==
=== Population ===
At the time of the 2006 National Census, the village's population was 1,968 in 423 households. The following census in 2011 counted 2,256 people in 607 households. The 2016 census measured the population of the village as 2,126 people in 615 households, the most populous in its rural district.
