= Surtajin =

Village in Hamadan province, Iran

Surtajin Persian: سورتجين
- Village
- Location within Iran
- Coordinates: 35°32′15″N 49°00′50″E
- Country: Iran
- Province: Hamadan
- County: Razan
- District: Central
- Rural District: Kharqan

Population (2016)
  - Total: 402
- Time zone: UTC+3:30 (IRST)

Surtajin (Persian: سورتجين) (Note: Also Romanized as Soortjin and Sūrtajīn; also known as Sūrtajen and Sūrteh Jīn) is a village in, and the capital of, Kharqan Rural District in the Central District of Razan County, Hamadan province, Iran.

== Demographics ==
=== Population ===
At the time of the 2006 National Census, the village's population was 364 in 95 households. The following census in 2011 counted 326 people in 107 households. The 2016 census measured the population of the village as 402 people in 124 households.
