= Sarijlu =

Village in Hamadan province, Iran

Sarijlu Persian: ساريجلو
- Village
- Location within Iran
- Coordinates: 35°36′41″N 48°53′27″E
- Country: Iran
- Province: Hamadan
- County: Razan
- District: Central
- Rural District: Kharqan

Population (2016)
  - Total: 707
- Time zone: UTC+3:30 (IRST)

Sarijlu (Persian: ساريجلو) (Note: Also romanized as Sārījelow and Sārījlū; also known as Sārī Chollū, Sarīchloo, Sārījehlū, Sarjal, and Sārjalāh) is a village in Kharqan Rural District of the Central District in Razan County, Hamadan province, Iran.

== Demographics ==
=== Population ===
At the time of the 2006 National Census, the village's population was 880 in 196 households. The following census in 2011 counted 966 people in 259 households. The 2016 census measured the population of the village as 707 people in 233 households, the most populous in its rural district.
