= Vafs, Hamadan =

Vafs وفس
- Village
- Location within Iran
- Coordinates: 35°28′12″N 48°59′42″E
- Country: Iran
- Province: Hamadan
- County: Razan
- Bakhsh: Central
- Rural District: Razan

Population (2006)
  - Total: 456
- Time zone: UTC+3:30 (IRST)
  - Summer (DST): UTC+4:30 (IRDT)

Vafs (Persian: وفس) is a village in Razan Rural District, in the Central District of Razan County, Hamadan Province, Iran. At the 2006 census, its population was 456, in 96 families.
