= Amirabad, Razan =

Village in Hamadan province, Iran

Amirabad Persian: اميراباد
- Village
- Location within Iran
- Coordinates: 35°28′34″N 49°03′13″E
- Country: Iran
- Province: Hamadan
- County: Razan
- District: Central
- Rural District: Kharqan

Population (2016)
  - Total: 455
- Time zone: UTC+3:30 (IRST)

Amirabad (Persian: اميراباد) (Note: Also romanized as Amīrābād; also known as Amīrābād-e Razan) is a village in Kharqan Rural District of the Central District in Razan County, Hamadan province, Iran.

== Demographics ==
=== Population ===
At the time of the 2006 National Census, the village's population was 507 in 128 households. The following census in 2011 counted 473 people in 127 households. The 2016 census measured the population of the village as 455 people in 146 households.
