= Gavanlu, Razan =

Village in Hamadan province, Iran

Gavanlu Persian: گونلو
- Village
- Location within Iran
- Coordinates: 35°33′36″N 48°58′54″E
- Country: Iran
- Province: Hamadan
- County: Razan
- District: Central
- Rural District: Kharqan

Population (2016)
  - Total: 395
- Time zone: UTC+3:30 (IRST)

Gavanlu (Persian: گونلو) (Note: Also romanized as Gavanlooand Gavanlū; also known as Kābanlū and Kūnlū) is a village in Kharqan Rural District of the Central District in Razan County, Hamadan province, Iran.

== Demographics ==
=== Population ===
At the time of the 2006 National Census, the village's population was 452 in 116 households. The following census in 2011 counted 404 people in 116 households. The 2016 census measured the population of the village as 395 people in 123 households.
