= Varqestan =

Village in Hamadan province, Iran

Varqestan Persian: ورقستان
- Village
- Location within Iran
- Coordinates: 35°23′44″N 49°00′48″E
- Country: Iran
- Province: Hamadan
- County: Razan
- District: Central
- Rural District: Razan

Population (2016)
  - Total: 1,037
- Time zone: UTC+3:30 (IRST)

Varqestan (Persian: ورقستان) (Note: Also romanized as Varqestān) is a village in Razan Rural District of the Central District in Razan County, Hamadan province, Iran.

== Demographics ==
=== Population ===
At the time of the 2006 National Census, the village's population was 977 in 205 households. The following census in 2011 counted 1,057 people in 269 households. The 2016 census measured the population of the village as 1,037 people in 292 households.
