= Durnian =

Village in Hamadan province, Iran

Durnian Persian: دورنيان
- Village
- Location within Iran
- Coordinates: 35°28′55″N 49°02′24″E
- Country: Iran
- Province: Hamadan
- County: Razan
- District: Central
- Rural District: Kharqan

Population (2016)
  - Total: 342
- Time zone: UTC+3:30 (IRST)

Durnian (Persian: دورنيان) (Note: Also romanized as Dūrneyān and Dūrnīān; also known as Darnīān and Darniyan) is a village in Kharqan Rural District of the Central District in Razan County, Hamadan province, Iran.

== Demographics ==
=== Population ===
At the time of the 2006 National Census, the village's population was 349 in 76 households. The following census in 2011 counted 312 people in 85 households. The 2016 census measured the population of the village as 342 people in 109 households.
