= Khomeygan =

Village in Hamadan province, Iran

Khomeygan Persian: خمايگان
- Village
- Location within Iran
- Coordinates: 35°22′06″N 49°01′20″E
- Country: Iran
- Province: Hamadan
- County: Razan
- District: Central
- Rural District: Razan

Population (2016)
  - Total: 1,047
- Time zone: UTC+3:30 (IRST)

Khomeygan (Persian: خمايگان) (Note: Also romanized as Khomeygān) is a village in Razan Rural District of the Central District in Razan County, Hamadan province, Iran.

== Demographics ==
=== Population ===
At the time of the 2006 National Census, the village's population was 1,120 in 250 households. The following census in 2011 counted 1,143 people in 310 households. The 2016 census measured the population of the village as 1,047 people in 309 households.
