= Nawar =

Nawwar or Nawar may refer to:

- Nawar people, a Dom ethnic minority in Syria, Lebanon, and Jordan
- Nawar Valley, a town in Himachal Pradesh, India
- Nawar, a character from the Quest for Glory series of computer games
- An acronym used in e-readiness that stands for "networking, applications, web-accessibility and readiness"
- The name of the territory of the kingdom of Urkesh

== See also ==
- Navar (disambiguation)
