= Ab Barik, Razan =

Village in Hamadan province, Iran

Ab Barik Persian: اب باريك
- Village
- Location within Iran
- Coordinates: 35°16′07″N 48°56′26″E
- Country: Iran
- Province: Hamadan
- County: Razan
- District: Central
- Rural District: Razan

Population (2016)
  - Total: 766
- Time zone: UTC+3:30 (IRST)

Ab Barik (Persian: اب باريك) (Note: Also romanized as Āb Bārīk, Āb-e Bārīk, and Āb-ī-Bārīk) is a village in Razan Rural District of the Central District in Razan County, Hamadan province, Iran.

== Demographics ==
=== Population ===
At the time of the 2006 National Census, the village's population was 904 in 216 households. The following census in 2011 counted 1,014 people in 254 households. The 2016 census measured the population of the village as 766 people in 216 households.
