= Nuwar =

Nuwar may refer to:

- Storm Worm, malicious computer code
- Nuwar, Iran, a village in Hamadan Province, Iran
