= Kahard =

Village in Hamadan province, Iran

Kahard Persian: كهارد
- Village
- Location within Iran
- Coordinates: 35°17′12″N 49°00′16″E
- Country: Iran
- Province: Hamadan
- County: Razan
- District: Central
- Rural District: Razan

Population (2016)
  - Total: 1,444
- Time zone: UTC+3:30 (IRST)

Kahard (Persian: كهارد) (Note: Also romanized as Kahārd and Kahārad) is a village in Razan Rural District of the Central District in Razan County, Hamadan province, Iran.

== Demographics ==
=== Population ===
At the time of the 2006 National Census, the village's population was 1,411 in 301 households. The following census in 2011 counted 1,525 people in 399 households. The 2016 census measured the population of the village as 1,444 people in 399 households.
