= Mahnian =

Village in Hamadan province, Iran

Mahnian Persian: ماهنيان
- Village
- Location within Iran
- Coordinates: 35°30′09″N 49°03′57″E
- Country: Iran
- Province: Hamadan
- County: Razan
- District: Central
- Rural District: Kharqan

Population (2016)
  - Total: 432
- Time zone: UTC+3:30 (IRST)

Mahnian (Persian: ماهنيان) (Note: Also romanized as Māhnīān and Mahnīyan; also known as Māhīān, Mānīān, Mānīyān, and Manīyāu) is a village in Kharqan Rural District of the Central District in Razan County, Hamadan province, Iran.

== Demographics ==
=== Population ===
At the time of the 2006 National Census, the village's population was 480 in 116 households. The following census in 2011 counted 439 people in 116 households. The 2016 census measured the population of the village as 432 people in 132 households.
