= Kharqan Rural District =

Kharqan Rural District (Persian: دهستان خرقان) may refer to:

- Kharqan Rural District (Razan County), Hamadan province
- Kharqan Rural District (Shahrud County), Semnan province
