= Haryan, Hamadan =

Village in Hamadan province, Iran

Haryan Persian: هريان
- Village
- Location within Iran
- Coordinates: 35°12′32″N 49°02′49″E
- Country: Iran
- Province: Hamadan
- County: Razan
- District: Central
- Rural District: Razan

Population (2016)
  - Total: 1,176
- Time zone: UTC+3:30 (IRST)

Haryan (Persian: هريان) (Note: Also romanized as Harīyān and Haryān) is a village in Razan Rural District of the Central District in Razan County, Hamadan province, Iran.

== Demographics ==
=== Population ===
At the time of the 2006 National Census, the village's population was 1,455 in 339 households. The following census in 2011 counted 1,502 people in 389 households. The 2016 census measured the population of the village as 1,176 people in 369 households.
