= Tish-atal =

Hurrian leader (c. 2000 BC)

Tish-atal 𒋾 𒅖 𒀀 𒊑

King of Urkesh
- Reign: c. 2000 BC

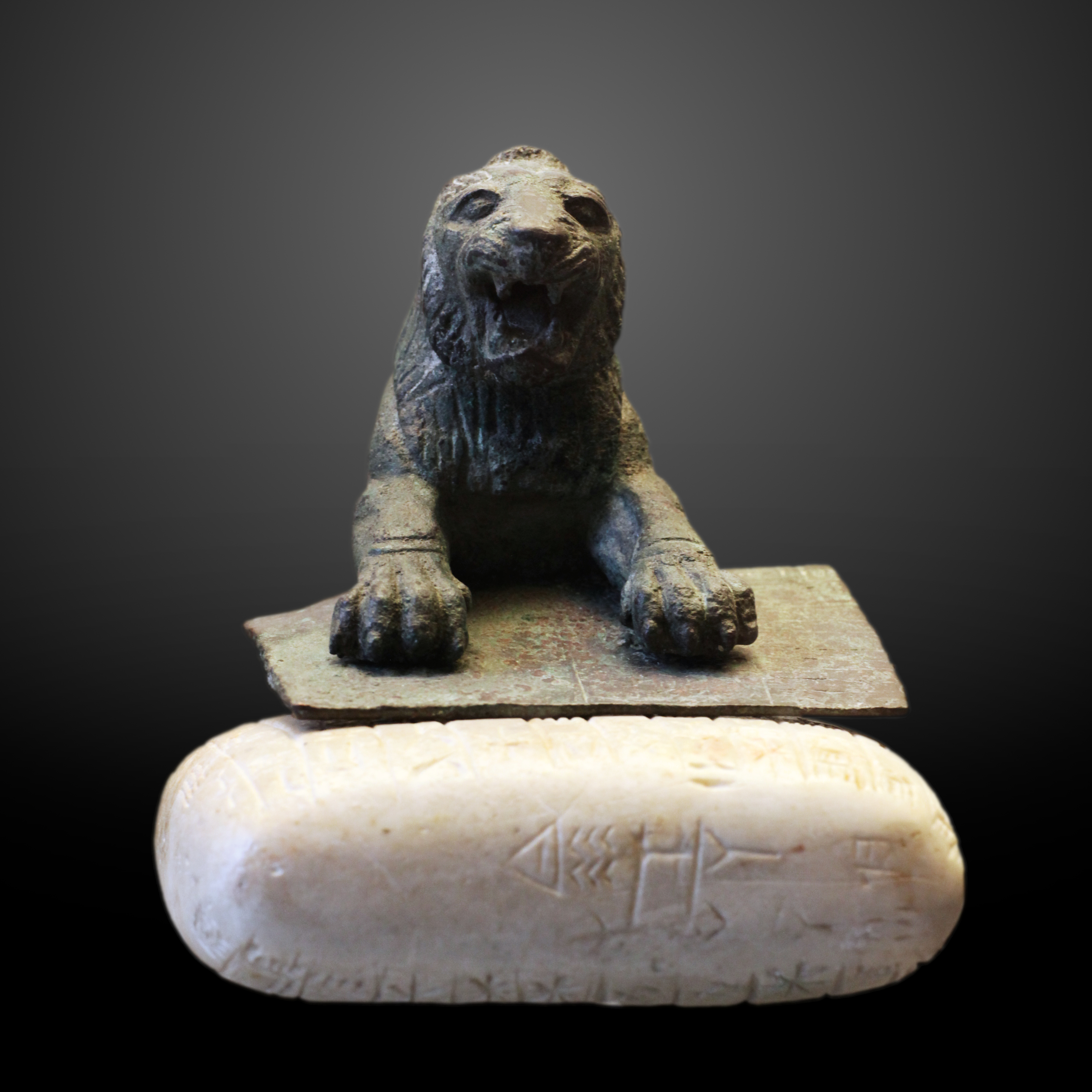
The Louvre lion of Tish-atal and accompanying stone tablet bearing the earliest known text in Hurrian

Tish-atal (Hurrian 𒋾 𒅖 𒀀 𒊑; fl. c. 2000 BC) was endan (a king or high priest) of Urkesh during the Third Dynasty of Ur. He was one of the earliest known Hurrian rulers, but the archaeological record is fragmentary for this period, and no precise date can be ascribed to his reign.

== Name ==
In older literature the name Tishari is sometimes used, but it has now been established that the correct rendering is Tish-atal.

Two other rulers with a similar name are known from around the same period, Tish-atal of Nineveh and Dishatal, king of Karaḫar. These are thought to be distinct persons, so the name was probably common in the area where the Hurrians lived.

== Inscription ==
A cuneiform inscription about a temple of Nergal is the only source for Tish-atal. The text is found on two bronze lion statuettes, but there is a better preserved copy on a stone tablet, now in the Louvre Museum, along with one of the lions. This famous inscription is the earliest known writing in the Hurrian language. The following translation is given by Mirjo Salvini:

Tish-atal, endan of Urkesh, has built a temple for Nergal. May the god Lubadag protect it. He who destroys this temple, may Lubadag destroy. May the god [...] not hear his prayers. May the lady of Nagar, Shimaga and the storm god curse ten thousand times he who destroys it.

== Bibliography ==
- Urkesh and the Hurrians: Studies in Honor of Lloyd Cotsen, ed. G. Bucaletti and M. Kelly-Bucaletti, Undena Publications, Malibu 1998, ISBN 0-89003-501-6:
  - Salvini, Mirjo (1998). The Earliest Evidences of the Hurrians Before the Formation of the Reign of Mittanni
  - Taracha, Piotr (2009.). Religions of Second Millennium Anatolia
  - Wilhelm, Gernot (1998). Die inschrift des Tišatal von Urkeš
