= Farsejin, Hamadan =

Village in Hamadan province, Iran

Farsejin Persian: فارسجين
- Village
- Location within Iran
- Coordinates: 35°22′45″N 49°03′19″E
- Country: Iran
- Province: Hamadan
- County: Razan
- District: Central
- Rural District: Razan

Population (2016)
  - Total: 853
- Time zone: UTC+3:30 (IRST)

Farsejin (Persian: فارسجين) (Note: Also romanized as Fārsejīn and Fārsjīn; also known as Fārīs Jīn, Fārschīn, Fārsījīn, and Fārsjīa) is a village in Razan Rural District of the Central District in Razan County, Hamadan province, Iran.

== Demographics ==
=== Population ===
At the time of the 2006 National Census, the village's population was 941 in 224 households. The following census in 2011 counted 977 people in 273 households. The 2016 census measured the population of the village as 853 people in 261 households.
