= Hurrian foundation pegs =

Ancient copper foundation pegs

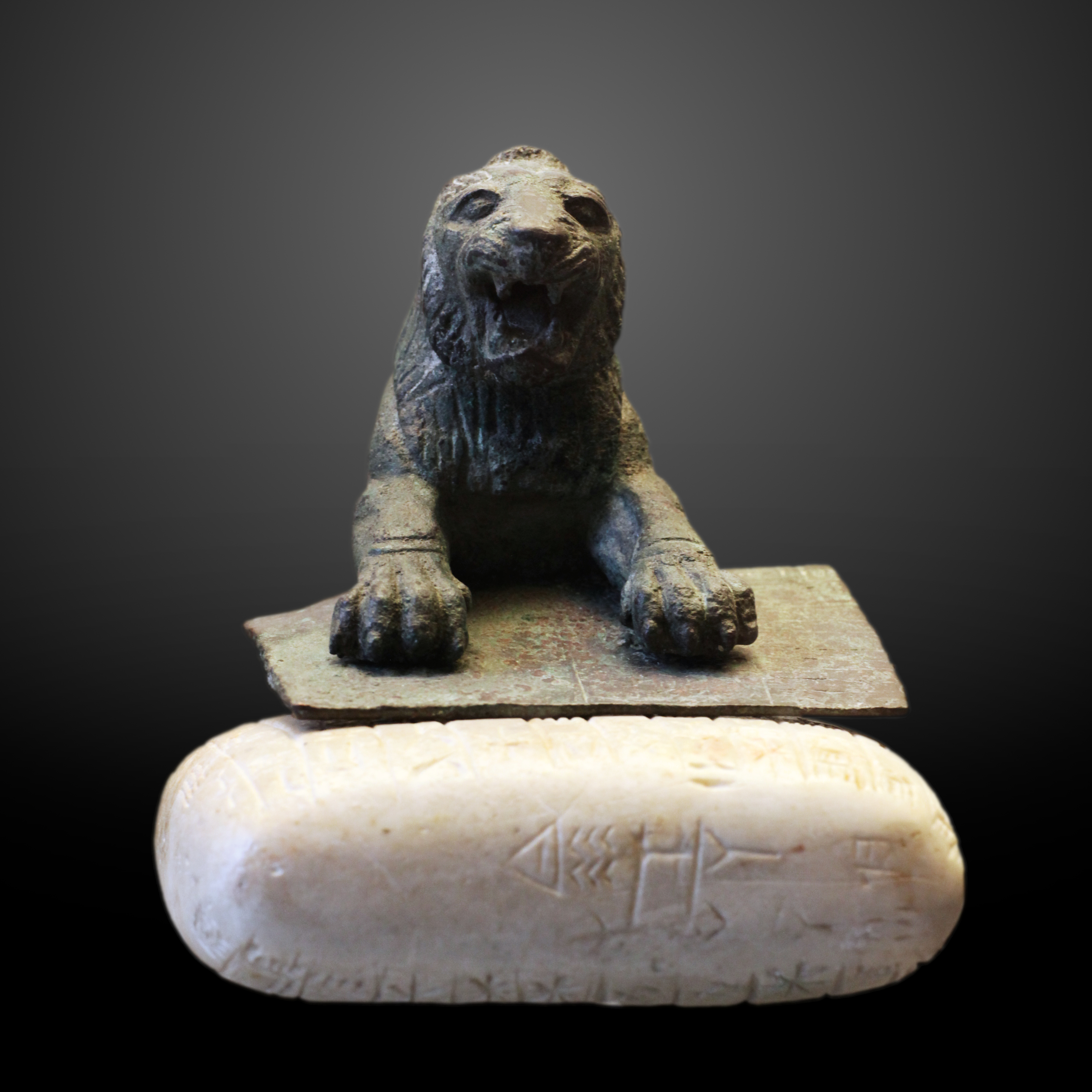
- The Louvre lion and accompanying stone tablet
- Material: Copper, limestone
- Size: Louvre lion: 12.2 cm × 8.5 cm (4.8 in × 3.3 in); Limestone tablet: 10 cm × 9 cm (3.9 in × 3.5 in); Met lion: 11.7 cm × 7.9 cm (4.6 in × 3.1 in)
- Writing: Cuneiform inscription in Hurrian
- Created: c. 2300 – c. 2159 BCE
- Period/culture: Akkadian/Hurrian
- Discovered: Unknown
- Place: Temple of Nergal, Urkesh, Syria
- Present location: Musée du Louvre, Paris; Metropolitan Museum of Art, New York
- Identification: Louvre lion: AO 19938; Louvre tablet: AO 19937; Met lion: 48.180

The Hurrian foundation pegs, also known as the Urkish lions, are twin copper foundation pegs each in the shape of a lion that probably came from the ancient city of Urkesh (modern Tell Mozan) in Syria. The pegs were placed at the foundation of the temple of Nergal in the city of Urkesh as mentioned in the cuneiform inscriptions on them. The inscription on the two pegs and the associated stone tablet is the oldest known text in the Hurrian language. One of the lions is now housed, along with its limestone tablet, in the Musée du Louvre in Paris. The second lion is on display at the Metropolitan Museum of Art in New York.

== Overview ==
The foundation pegs are dated to the Akkadian period c. 2300 – c. 2159 BCE. They were placed in the foundation of the temple of Nergal, the god of the underworld, during its construction. The pegs were deposited to protect and preserve the temple and the Hurrian prince of Urkesh, Tish-atal, who dedicated it. The upper part of the figurines depict a snarling lion with the forelegs stretched forward, while the lower part is a thick peg. The lion places its paws on a copper plaque with cuneiform inscriptions. The copper plate and the lion pegs were made separately and then attached together. The use of such lion figures for protection was commonplace in Ancient Mesopotamia, but the Urkish lions are unique in their use as foundation pegs.

=== Louvre lion and tablet ===
The Louvre lion measures 12.2 by 8.5 centimetres (4.8 by 3.3 in) while the attached plaque is 8.5 centimetres (3.3 in) wide. The inscription on the copper plaque is largely erased but the legible parts confirm that it is a copy of the cuneiform inscription found on the stone tablet. The white limestone tablet, which fits under the copper plate and measures 10 by 9 centimetres (3.9 by 3.5 in), bears the following inscription:

Tishatal, [Endan] king of Urkesh, has built a temple for the god Nergal. May the god Nubadag protect this temple. May Nubadag destroy whomsoever seeks to destroy [it]; may his god not listen to his prayers. May the Lady of Nagar, [the sun god] Shimiga, and the god of the storm [curse 10,000 times whomsoever might seek to destroy it].

The inscription is the earliest known text written in the Hurrian language. The stone tablet was buried along with the metal peg as evidenced by the imprints of the copper oxide on the tablet, and the reverse imprints of the tablet in the oxide of the copper plate.

=== Metropolitan Museum lion ===
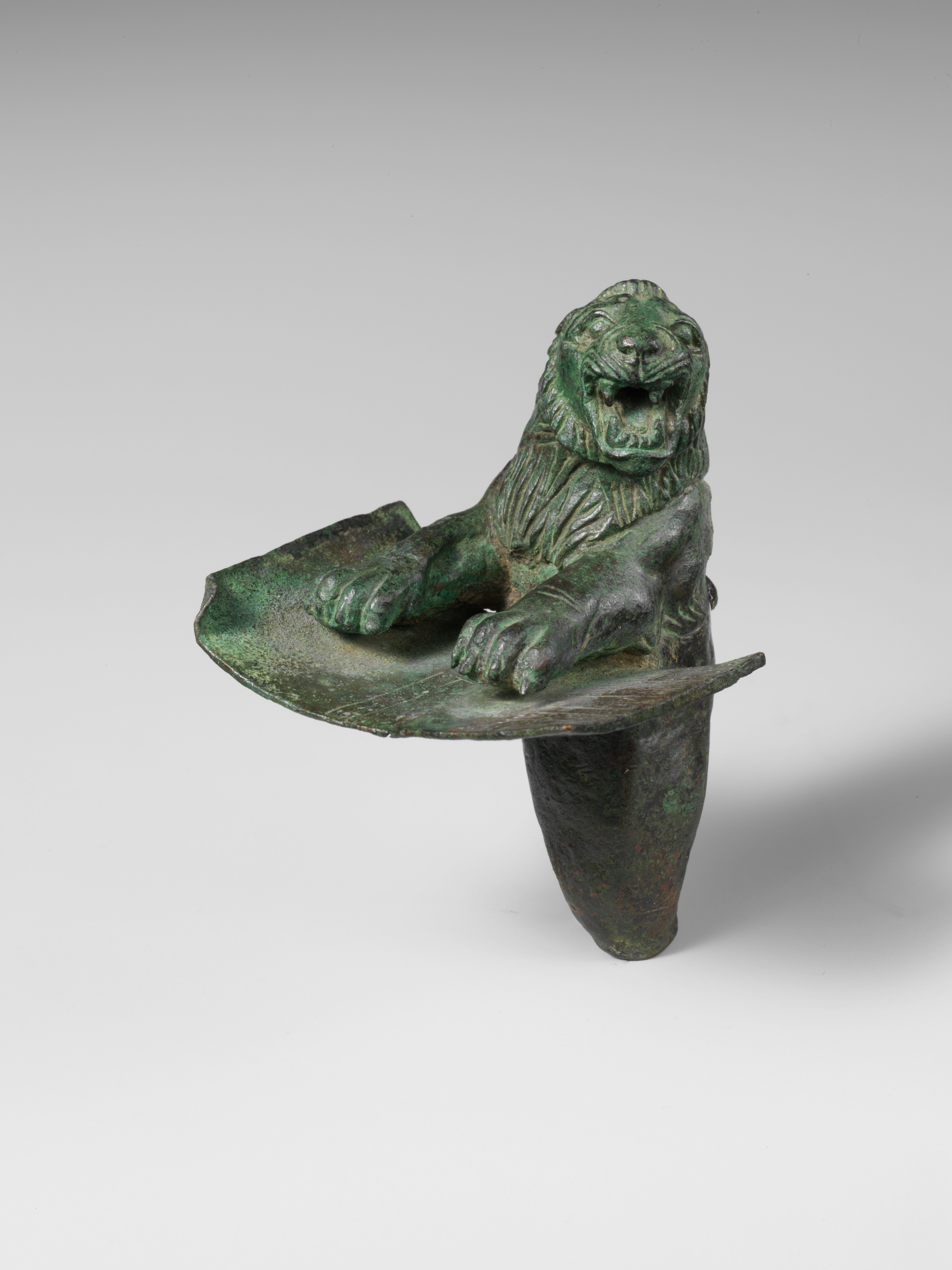
Foundation peg in the form of the forepart of a lion, Metropolitan Museum of Art

The Met lion measures 11.7 by 7.9 centimetres (4.6 by 3.1 in) and while it was made from a different mold to that of the Louvre, it is considered stylistically the same. The copper tablet still has legible traces of the cuneiform inscriptions. The inscriptions spanned fourteen lines. Lines 1–12 were incised vertically between the edge of the plate and the lion's left foreleg. Lines 13 and 14 were incised horizontally between the two stretched forelegs of the lion. The legible traces seem to confirm that the inscribed text is also a copy of the full inscription found on the Louvre stone tablet.

== Acquisition ==
Neither artefact has an archaeological record for its acquisition, and thus their original setting can not be confirmed. The Louvre lion and accompanying stone tablet were acquired in 1948 from a Parisian antiquities dealer. The Met lion was also purchased in 1948 from a New York antiquities dealer with funds from the Joseph Pulitzer bequest.

== See also ==
- Art of Mesopotamia
- Hurrian language
