= Razan =

City in Hamadan province, Iran

Razan Persian: رزن
- City
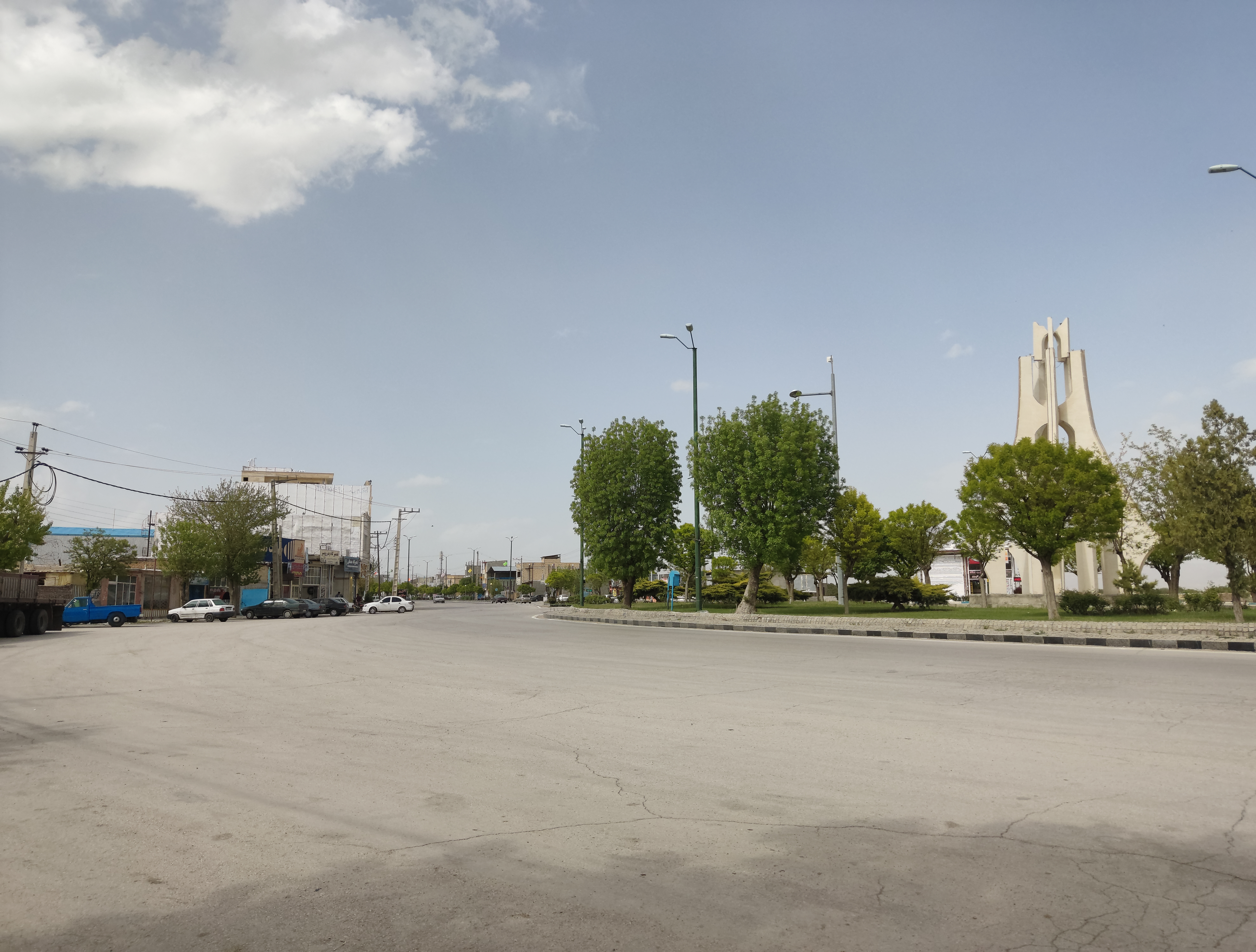
- Razan in 2022

- Location within Iran
- Coordinates: 35°23′33″N 49°01′59″E
- Country: Iran
- Province: Hamadan
- County: Razan
- District: Central

Population (2016)
  - Total: 14,275
- Time zone: UTC+3:30 (IRST)

Razan (Persian: رزن) is a city in the Central District of Razan County, Hamadan province, Iran, serving as capital of both the county and the district. It is also the administrative center for Razan Rural District.

== Demographics ==
=== Language ===
Linguistic composition of the city.

Razan, Iran linguistic composition
language	percent
Azerbaijani	60%
Persian	40%

=== Population ===
At the time of the 2006 National Census, the city's population was 11,390 in 2,871 households. The following census in 2011 counted 13,711 people in 3,650 households. The 2016 census measured the population of the city as 14,275 people in 4,082 households.
