= Urkesh =

Ancient City state (2700 BC - ?)

- Tell Mozan
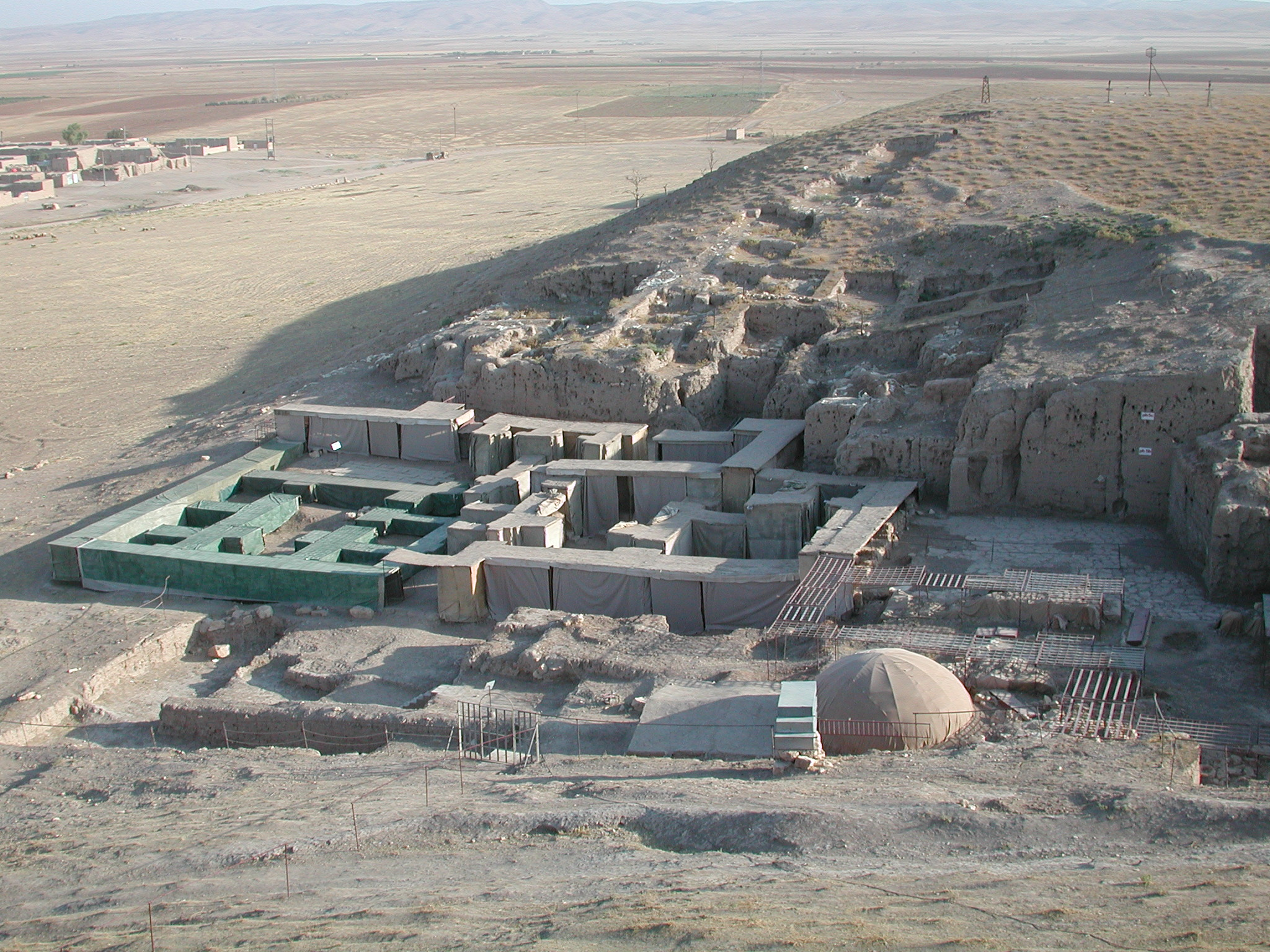
- General view of the Palace at Urkesh in 2000

- Location in Syria
- 37°3′25″N 40°59′50″E
- Type: Settlement
- Location: Hasakah, Syria

History
- Built: c. 2500 BC
- Abandoned: c. 1350 BC

Site notes
- Excavation dates: 1984-2010
- Archaeologists: Max Mallowan, Giorgio Buccellati, Marilyn Kelly-Buccellati, Peter Pfrilzner

Urkesh, also transliterated Urkish (Akkadian: 𒌨𒆧𒆠 UR.KIŠ^{KI}, 𒌨𒋙𒀭𒄲𒆠 UR.KEŠ_{3}^{KI}; modern Tell Mozan (also Tall Mozan); Arabic: تل موزان), is a tell, or settlement mound, located in the foothills of the Taurus Mountains in Hasakah, Syria. It was founded during the 3rd millennium BC, possibly by the Hurrians, on a site which appears to have been inhabited previously for a few centuries. The Hurrians likely formed an obscure kingdom centered around Urkesh, from where they would later traditionally trace their kingship. The city god of Urkesh was Kumarbi, father of Teshup. The site of Tell Shermola in the modern city of Amuda lies around 7 kilometers away and was where the Hurrian foundation pegs ("Urkish lions") were thought to have been sold into the antiquities market.

There are other contemporary ancient sites in this area of upper Khabur River basin. For example, Chagar Bazar is 22 km south of Mozan. Tell Arbid is located 45 km south of Tell Mozan. Tell Brak is around 50 km to the south.

Tell Leilan is located around 50 km to the east of Urkesh. Leilan, Brak and Urkesh were particularly prominent during the Akkadian period.

== History ==
Map of the Khabur Basin during the Bronze Age showing the location of Tell Mozan and Tell Brak

There is some evidence of minor occupation in the site during the Late Chalcolithic period based on pottery and burials.

=== Early Bronze Age ===
==== EB IVA: Akkadian period ====
Seal inscriptions give evidence for a city ruler with the presumably Hurrian name of Tupkish, and his queen with the name of Uqnitum (possibly Akkadian and id so meaning "lapis lazuli") as well as two of her servants, the cook Tuli and nurse Zamena. The queens seals were more numerous than those of the king and were used mainly to seal doors and containers. Tupkish, who ruled during the ascendancy of Akkad, assumed the title of "king of Urkesh and Nagar". The large palace of Tupkish, also occupied by the next two rulers before being abandoned, had a service wing and a residential wing, both with courtyards. At this time a city wall, with associated ditch, was built to encompass Urkesh, including the Lower Town. Seals of a daughter Tar'am-Agade of the Akkadian ruler Naram-Sin were found at the site. They read "(Of) Naram-Sin, the king of Akkad, Tar'am-Agade, his daughter". It is thought that she was either the head temple prietess at Urkesh, several other daughters of Naram-Sin having assumed that role in other empire cites, or was married to the king of Urkesh.

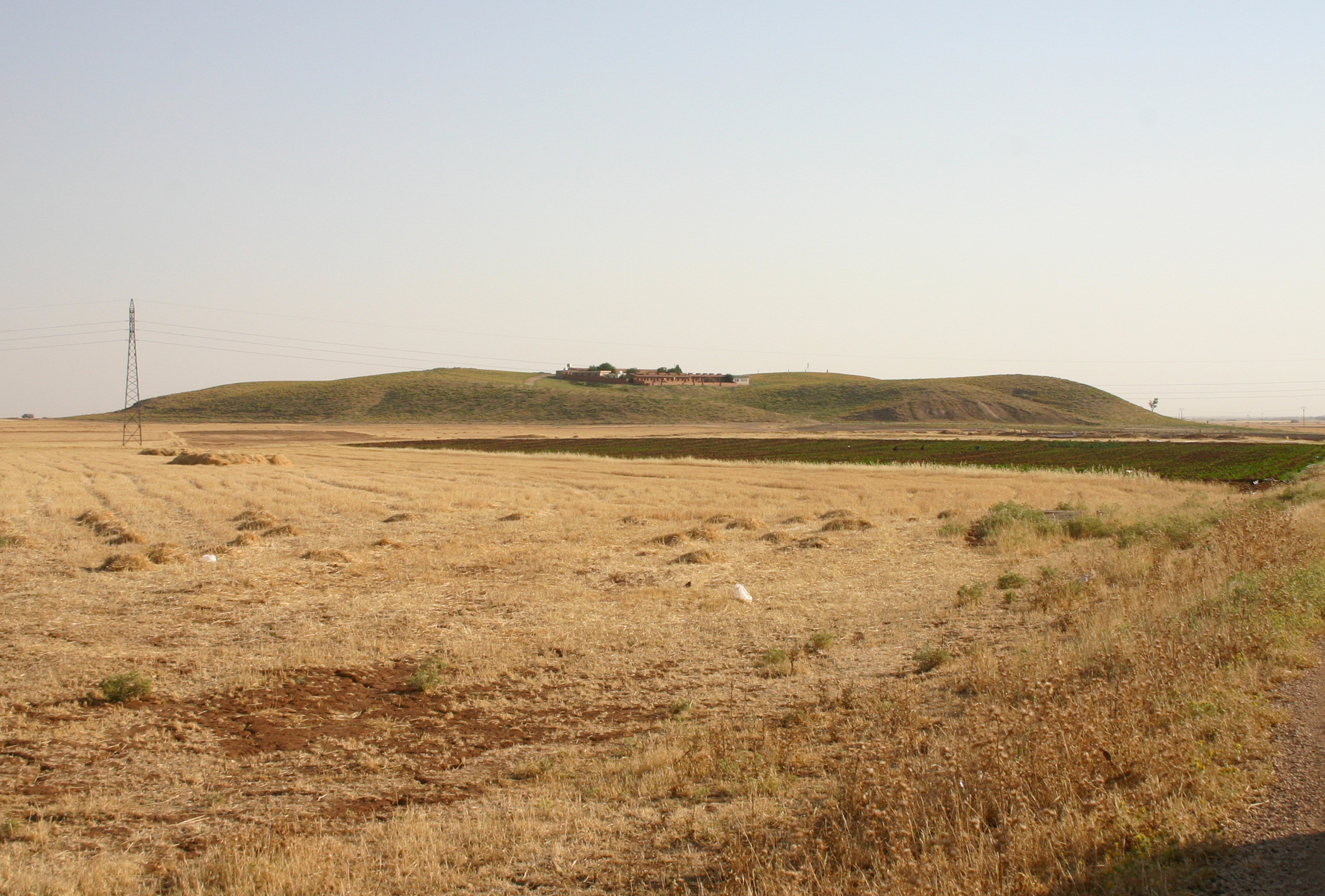
View of Tell Mozan from the north

Evidence for a significant Hurrian influence at Urkesh in the late 3rd millennium BC, unlike the early 2nd millennium BC, is relatively modest. Most of the inscriptions and texts are written in Akkadian or Sumerian. One text has been suggested as being in Hurrian. The Urkesh Lions were written in Hurrian but are of uncertain provenance, having been looted and entered into the antiquities market, and of uncertain, chronology of the ruler Tiš-atal being unknown, though likely later date. A few patronyms, including the ruler Tupkish, a Hapax legomenon, have been suggested as being Hurrian.

==== EB IVB: Ur III period ====
One small Ur III period cuneiform tablet was found.

=== Middle Bronze Age ===
During this period the abandoned palace of Tupkish was used as a graveyard with an area of around 1,860 square meters, built along the foundation walls. There were two periods of use, corresponding to the Isin-Larsa (MB I) and Old Babylonian periods (MB II), separated by a short period of abandonment. Burial tyoes were primarily pit and jar burials, though a few built tombs and one vaulted tomb were found. Grave goods were primarily pottery though they included bronze tools and jewellery.

During the early 2nd millennium BC, the city passed into the hands of the rulers of Mari, a city a few hundred miles to the south. The king of Urkesh became a vassal (and apparently an appointee) of Mari. The people of Urkesh evidently resented this, as the royal archives at Mari provide evidence of their strong resistance; in one letter, the king of Mari tells his Urkesh counterpart that "I did not know that the sons of your city hate you on my account. But you are mine, even if the city of Urkesh is not."

=== Late Bronze Age ===
==== Mitanni period ====
In the late 2nd millennium BC, Tell Mozan was the location of a Mitanni religious site.

As Suppiluliuma I of Hittite defeated Tushratta of Mitanni, and Tushratta was assassinated, Mitanni collapsed. The city appears to have been largely abandoned around 1350 BC, although the reason for this is unknown to archaeologists at this time. The region becomes contested by Hittite in the west regionally centered on Carchemish and Assyria in the east.

== Archaeology ==
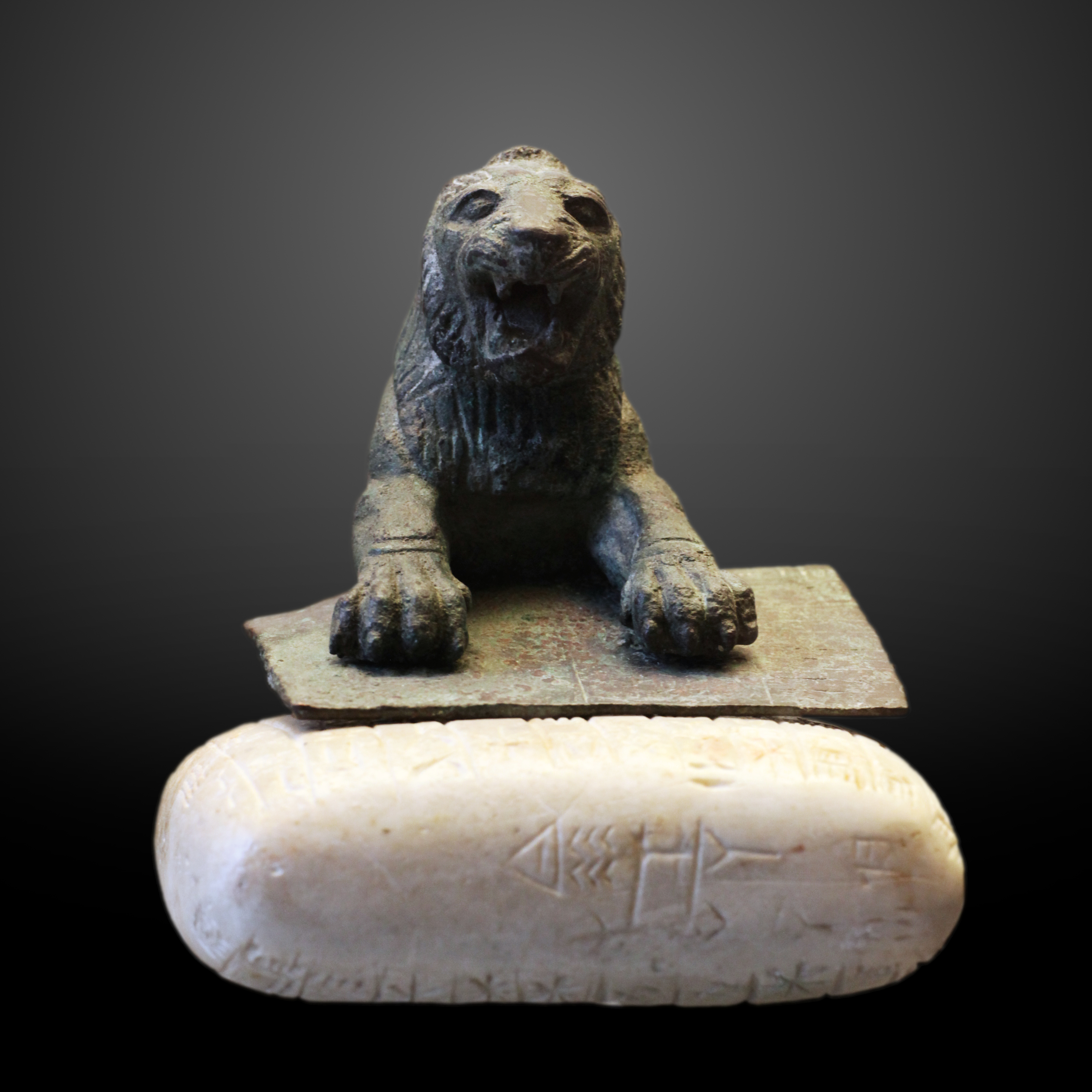
The Louvre lion and accompanying stone tablet bearing the earliest known text in Hurrian

The entire site covers around 135 hectares, mostly made up of the outer city. The high mound covers about 18 hectares (44 acres) and rises to a height of 25 meters, with 5 sub-mounds. The maximim area was reached in the 3rd millennium BC and on most of the site the 3rd millennium BC material lies just below the surface, without later occupational overburden. The high mound is surrounded by a mudbrick city wall that was roughly 8 meters wide and 7 meters high.

Soundings at the site were first made by Max Mallowan during his survey of the area. Agatha Christie, his wife, wrote that they chose not to continue at the site because it seemed to have Roman material. No trace of Roman occupation levels have been found in later excavations, however. Mallowan went on to excavate Chagar Bazar, another site to the south of Mozan/Urkesh.

Excavations at Urkesh began in 1984 and have been conducted for at least 17 seasons up to the present time. The work has been led by Giorgio Buccellati of UCLA and Marilyn Kelly-Buccellati of California State University, Los Angeles. The 2007 season was primarily dedicated to working on publication material, primarily excavation units A16, J1, J3 and J4. A small sounding was done in J1 to clarify the transition between Mittani and Khabur. From 1998 to 2001, the excavations were joined by Deutsche Orient-Gesellschaft (German Oriental Society) team directed by Peter Pfrilzner of the University of Tubingen.

Important excavated structures include the royal palace of Tupkish, an associated necromantic underground structure (Abi), a monumental temple terrace with a plaza in front and a temple at the top, residential areas, burial areas, and the inner and outer city walls.

The temple at Urkesh sits on a raised platform at the center of the mound. The platform has a stone revetment wall and a monumental staircase gives access from the surrounding plaza. It was begun roughly in the Early Dynastic III to Akkadian Empire period. The plaza, encompassed by another wall, during the Akkadian Empire period became the site of the large palace of Tupkish. The temple itself (Area BA) is of the standard "bent-axis" form and had four major building phases with the later phases more subject to erosion. Phase 1, the old and proposed to date to Early Dynastic III, was destroyed by fire. The limited nature of later phases make uncertain if the area was still being used as a temple. The deity worshiped in the temple is uncertain and both Nergal and Kumbari have been proposed. The palace had a service area and a residence area, the later being two meters higher.

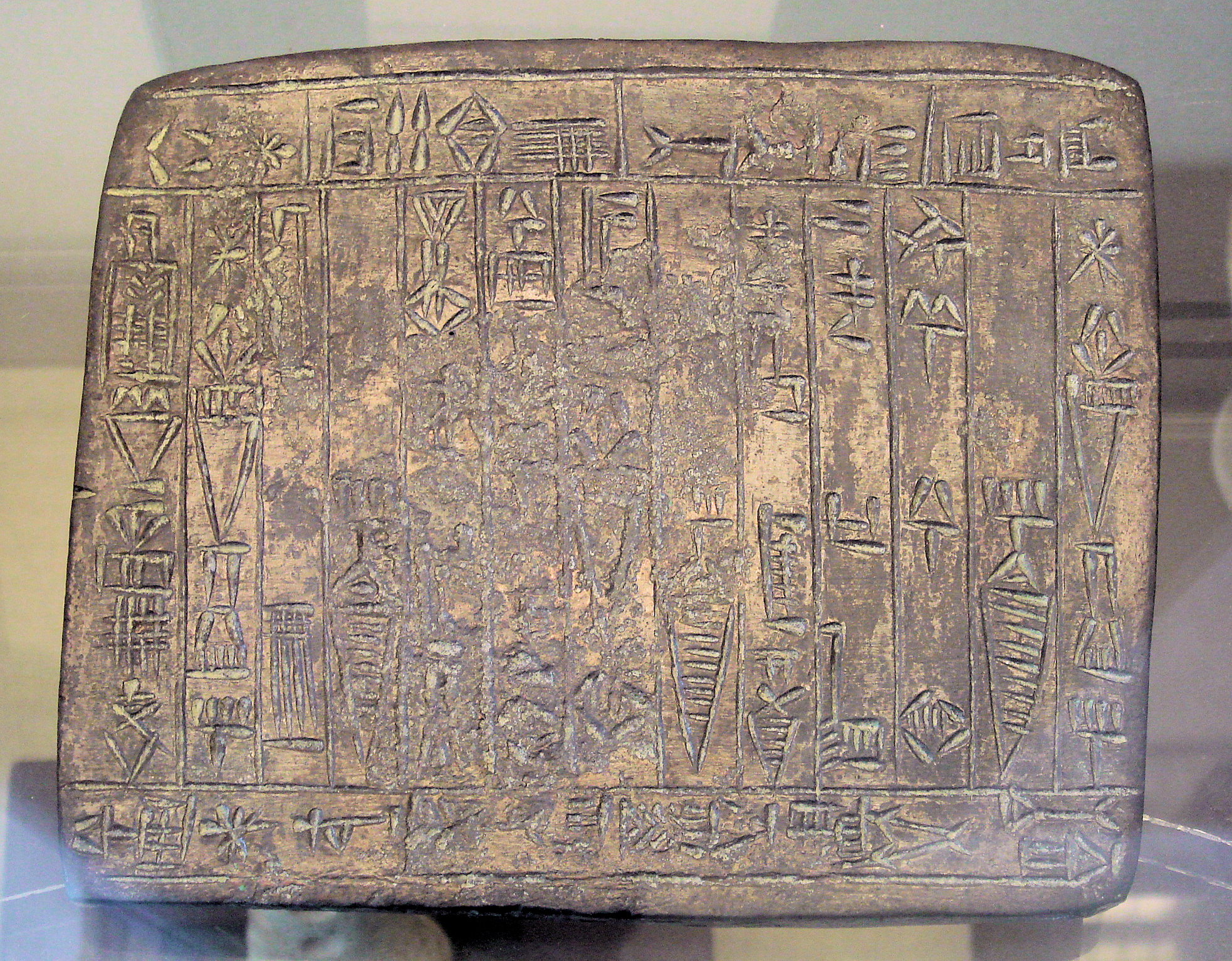
Foundation tablet. Dedication to God Nergal by Hurrian king Atalshen, king of Urkish and Nawar, Habur Bassin, around 2000 BC. Louvre Museum AO 5678. "Of Nergal the lord of Hawalum, Atal-shen, the caring shepherd, the king of Urkesh and Nawar, the son of Sadar-mat the king, is the builder of the temple of Nergal, the one who overcomes opposition. Let Shamash and Ishtar destroy the seeds of whoever removes this tablet. Shaum-shen is the craftsman."

One of the most important fixed points of reference for chronology are impressions on door sealings of the seal of Tar'am-Agade, the daughter of Naram-Sin, which because of stratigraphy can be firmly linked to phase 3 of the AP palace occupation.

Small finds included a number of terracotta animal figurines. Finds from the excavations at Tell Mozan are on display in the Deir ez-Zor Museum.

=== Syrian Civil War ===
Excavations are on hold during the Syrian Civil War since 2011. The site lies close to the Turkish border, and is protected by Kurdish troops and a team of local workers. Conservation activities continue at the site.

== Rulers ==
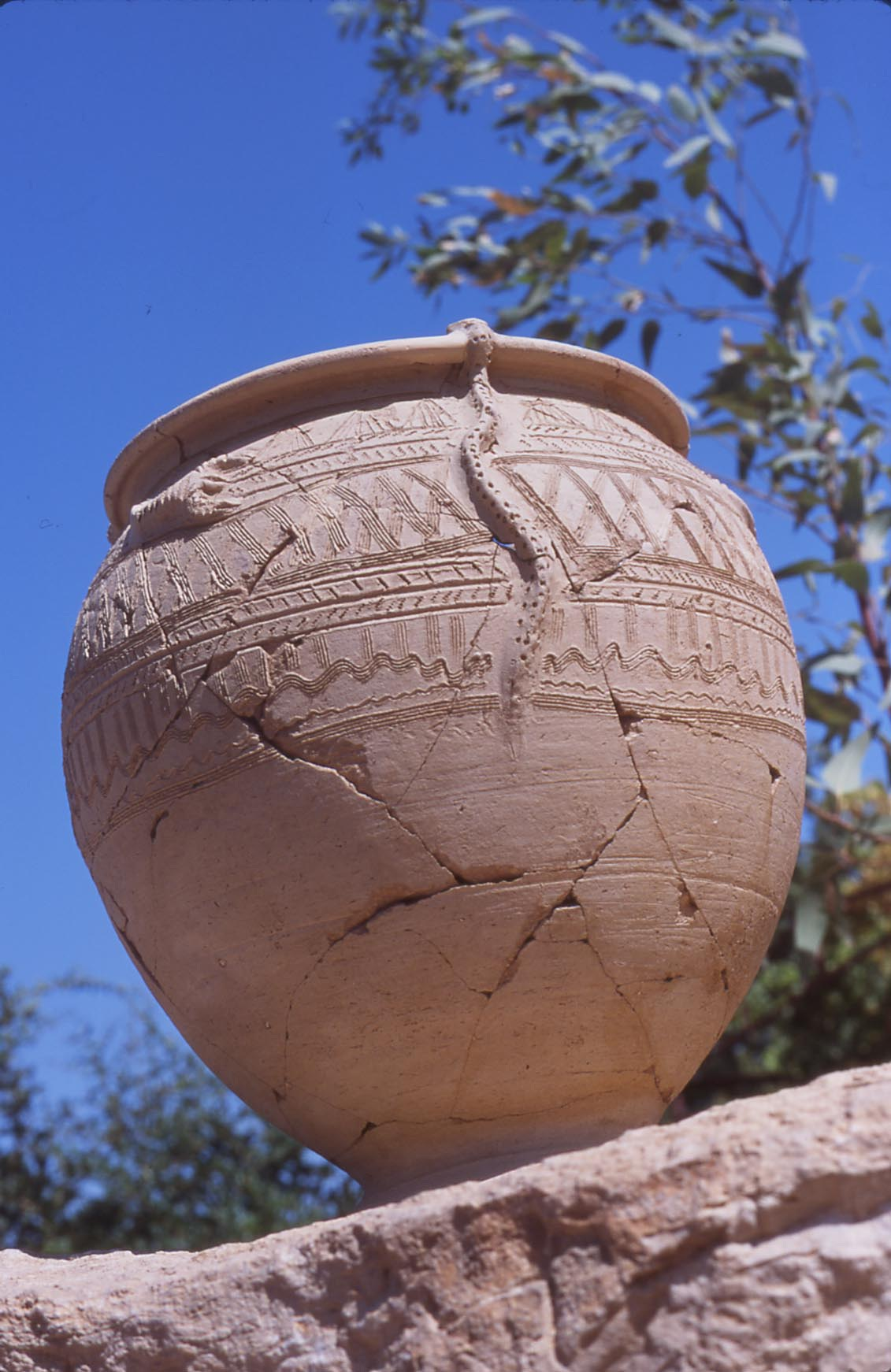
Large vessel from Urkesh, called 'altanni' in Hurrian

No year names of Urkesh rulers are known and only royal inscriptions of Tish-atal and Atal-sen are available. The known kings of Urkesh include:

Name	Reign	Comments
Tupkish	c. 2250 BC	One seal, "Tupkish, endan of Urkesh", is known
Tish-atal	c. 2000 BC	The Urkesh lions (and associated foundation tablets (AO 19938) carry the text "Tish-atal king of Urkesh the temple of NERGAL he built. the temple, this aforementioned one, Lubadag let him protect! ... let Lubadag destroy". The reading of Nergal is uncertain and the underlying cuneiform had been transliterated as "DINGIR=-KIŠ.GAL" or as "{d}pirig-gal" and there are also suggestions that this is an logogram representing a Hurrian god such as Kumarbi. Lubadag was a minor Hurrian god.
Atal-sen	c. 1800 BC	A text (AO 05678) whose provenance is uncertain but thought to be Samarra reads "Of Nergal the lord of Hawalum Atal-shen, the caring shepherd, the king of Urkesh and Nawar, the son of Sadar-mat the king, (is) the builder of the temple of Nergal ... Shamash and Ishtar his seed let them destroy". Again note that Nergal is transliterated "DINGIR=-KIS^.UNU.GAL" or "(d}nergal", that claims rulership of Urkesh and Nawar, and that that deities enforcing the text are Mesopotamian. It was not uncommon for rulers at this time to claim to have built when they were actually rebuilding.

The rulers Shatar-mat, Ishar-klnum, Te'irru, Ann-atal, and Haziran were also suggested.

== See also ==
- Cities of the ancient Near East
- List of Mesopotamian deities
- List of Mesopotamian dynasties
