= Navar, West Azerbaijan =

Navar ناور
- Village
- Location within Iran
- Coordinates: 38°56′10″N 44°13′52″E
- Country: Iran
- Province: West Azerbaijan
- County: Chaldoran
- Bakhsh: Central
- Rural District: Chaldoran-e Jonubi

Population (2006)
  - Total: 560
- Time zone: UTC+3:30 (IRST)
  - Summer (DST): UTC+4:30 (IRDT)

Navar (Persian: ناور, also Romanized as Nāvar, Nāver, and Nāvor) is a village in Chaldoran-e Jonubi Rural District, in the Central District of Chaldoran County, West Azerbaijan Province, Iran. At the 2006 census, its population was 560, in 108 families. According to Vladimir Minorsky, its name is derived from the Mongolian language and means "lake".
