= Garmak, Qazvin =

Garmak گرمك
- Village
- Location within Iran
- Coordinates: 36°33′12″N 50°19′31″E
- Country: Iran
- Province: Qazvin
- County: Qazvin
- Bakhsh: Alamut-e Gharbi
- Rural District: Rudbar-e Mohammad-e Zamani

Population (2006)
  - Total: 77
- Time zone: UTC+3:30 (IRST)
  - Summer (DST): UTC+4:30 (IRDT)

Garmak (Persian: گرمك) is a village in Rudbar-e Mohammad-e Zamani Rural District, Alamut-e Gharbi District, Qazvin County, Qazvin Province, Iran. At the 2006 census, its population was 77, in 20 families.
