= Navar, Hamadan =

Village in Hamadan province, Iran

Navar Persian: نوار
- Village
- Location within Iran
- Coordinates: 35°20′54″N 49°03′21″E
- Country: Iran
- Province: Hamadan
- County: Razan
- District: Central
- Rural District: Razan

Population (2016)
  - Total: 1,528
- Time zone: UTC+3:30 (IRST)

Navar (Persian: نوار) (Note: Also romanized as Navār; also known as Nuwar) is a village in Razan Rural District of the Central District in Razan County, Hamadan province, Iran.

The 14th-century author Hamdallah Mustawfi listed Navar as one of the main villages in the A‘lam district under Hamadan.

== Demographics ==
=== Population ===
At the time of the 2006 National Census, the village's population was 1,574 in 393 households. The following census in 2011 counted 1,797 people in 526 households. The 2016 census measured the population of the village as 1,528 people in 495 households.
