= Kharqan Rural District (Razan County) =

Rural district in Hamadan province, Iran

Kharqan Rural District Persian: دهستان خرقان
- Rural District
- Location within Iran
- Coordinates: 35°32′N 49°00′E
- Country: Iran
- Province: Hamadan
- County: Razan
- District: Central
- Established: 1987
- Capital: Surtajin

Population (2016)
  - Total: 4,776
- Time zone: UTC+3:30 (IRST)

Kharqan Rural District (Persian: دهستان خرقان) is in the Central District of Razan County, Hamadan province, Iran. Its capital is the village of Surtajin.

== Demographics ==
=== Population ===
At the time of the 2006 National Census, the rural district's population was 5,605 in 1,340 households. There were 5,263 inhabitants in 1,449 households at the following census of 2011. The 2016 census measured the population of the rural district as 4,776 in 1,545 households. The most populous of its 17 villages was Sarijlu, with 707 people.

=== Other villages in the rural district ===
- Amirabad
- Durnian
- Gavanlu
- Jerbanlu
- Laleh Dan
- Mahnian
