= Razan Rural District (Razan County) =

Rural district in Hamadan province, Iran

Razan Rural District Persian: دهستان رزن
- Rural District
- Location within Iran
- Coordinates: 35°21′N 48°59′E
- Country: Iran
- Province: Hamadan
- County: Razan
- District: Central
- Established: 1987
- Capital: Razan

Population (2016)
  - Total: 14,572
- Time zone: UTC+3:30 (IRST)

Razan Rural District (Persian: دهستان رزن) is in the Central District of Razan County, Hamadan province, Iran. It is administered from the city of Razan.

== Demographics ==
=== Population ===
At the time of the 2006 National Census, the rural district's population was 15,554 in 3,578 households. There were 16,587 inhabitants in 4,475 households at the following census of 2011. The 2016 census measured the population of the rural district as 14,572 in 4,343 households. The most populous of its 30 villages was Ommatlar, with 2,126 people.

=== Other villages in the rural district ===
- Ab Barik
- Farsejin
- Haryan
- Jamishlu
- Kahard
- Khomeygan
- Navar
- Varqestan
