= Central District (Razan County) =

District in Hamadan province, Iran

Central District (Razan County) Persian: بخش مرکزی شهرستان رزن
- District
- Location within Iran
- Coordinates: 35°26′N 49°00′E
- Country: Iran
- Province: Hamadan
- County: Razan
- Established: 1993
- Capital: Razan

Population (2016)
  - Total: 33,623
- Time zone: UTC+3:30 (IRST)

The Central District of Razan County (Persian: بخش مرکزی شهرستان رزن) is in Hamadan province, Iran. Its capital is the city of Razan.

== Demographics ==
=== Population ===
At the time of the 2006 National Census, the district's population was 32,549 in 7,789 households. The following census in 2011 counted 35,561 people in 9,574 households. The 2016 census measured the population of the district as 33,623 inhabitants in 9,970 households.

=== Administrative divisions ===
Central District (Razan County) Population
Administrative Divisions	2006	2011	2016
Kharqan RD	5,605	5,263	4,776
Razan RD	15,554	16,587	14,572
Razan (city)	11,390	13,711	14,275
Total	32,549	35,561	33,623
RD = Rural District
