= Deaths in May 1992 =

The following is a list of notable deaths in May 1992.

Entries for each day are listed alphabetically by surname. A typical entry lists information in the following sequence:

- Name, age, country of citizenship at birth, subsequent country of citizenship (if applicable), reason for notability, cause of death (if known), and reference.

== May 1992 ==
=== 1 ===
- Ahmet Aytar, 69-70, Turkish Olympic long-distance runner (1952).
- Agustin Cueva, 54, Ecuadorian writer, cancer.
- Hella Hammid, 70, German-American photographer.
- Sharon Redd, 46, American singer, pneumonia caused by AIDS.
- Justin Stein, 80, American baseball player.
- Celerino Sánchez, 48, Mexican baseball player (New York Yankees).
- Justin Stein, 80, American baseball player (Philadelphia Phillies, Cincinnati Reds).

=== 2 ===
- Cannonball Berry, 80, American baseball player.
- Stefano D'Arrigo, 72, Italian writer.
- Trevor Hatherton, 67, New Zealand geophysicist, scientific administrator and Antarctic scientist.
- Mike Karakas, 80, American ice hockey player (Chicago Black Hawks).
- Stefan Kieniewicz, 84, Polish historian.
- Wilbur Daigh Mills, 82, American politician, member of the U.S. House of Representatives (1939–1977).
- Kel Tremain, 54, New Zealand rugby player.
- Margarete Wallmann, 87-90, Austrian opera director and ballerina.

=== 3 ===
- Alummoodan, 59, Indian actor.
- Vilma Degischer, 80, Austrian theatre and film actress.
- Silvino Ferreira, 77, Brazilian Olympic sports shooter (1948).
- Godman Irvine, 82, Canadian-British politician.
- George Murphy, 89, American politician and actor, member of the U.S. Senate (1965–1971), leukemia.
- Kevin O'Donovan, 70, Irish Olympic basketball player (1992).

=== 4 ===
- Harry Bisbey, 60, American Olympic water polo player, (1952).
- Shane Curry, 24, American football player (Indianapolis Colts), shot.
- August Hellemans, 84, Belgian football player and Olympian (1928).
- Michael Howlett, 77, American politician, kidney failure.
- Ronnie Knox, 57, Canadian football player.
- Gregor Mackenzie, 64, British politician.
- Lyn Marshall, 47, British yoga teacher, ballerina, and actress, brain cancer.
- Thomas O. Paine, 70, American engineer and scientist, cancer.

=== 5 ===
- Adriana Admiraal-Meijerink, 98, Dutch Olympic fencer (1924, 1928).
- Yunis Aliyev, 33, Azerbaijani soldier and war hero, killed in action.
- Del M. Clawson, 78, American politician, member of the U.S. House of Representatives (1963–1978).
- Fikret Hajiyev, 27, Azerbaijani soldier and war hero, killed in action.
- Kerim Kerimov, 20, Azerbaijani soldier, killed in battle.
- Sarkhan Ojaqverdiyev, 24, Azerbaijani soldier and war hero, killed in action.
- Jean-Claude Pascal, 64, French actor, stomach cancer.
- Jean Vauthier, 81, French playwright.
- Dick Yarmy, 59, American actor (Get Smart, Mork & Mindy, Emergency!), lung cancer.

=== 6 ===
- Marlene Dietrich, 90, German-American actress (Morocco, Touch of Evil, Judgment at Nuremberg), kidney failure.
- Malcolm A. MacIntyre, 84, American lawyer and hall of fame lacrosse player.
- Gaston Reiff, 71, Belgian Olympic runner (1948, 1952).
- Jilly Rizzo, 75, American restaurateur and actor, traffic collision.
- Tatyana Yesenina, 73, Soviet writer.

=== 7 ===
- Nachhatar Chhatta, 32, Indian singer, alcohol intoxication.
- Kiril Hristov, 42, Bulgarian football player and Olympian (1968).
- Soerip, 70, Indonesian singer and film actress.
- Tiny Timbrell, 75, Canadian musician.

=== 8 ===
- Albert Agarunov, 23, Azerbaijani soldier and war hero, killed in action.
- Addeke Hendrik Boerma, 80, Dutch civil servant.
- Richard Derr, 74, American actor (When Worlds Collide, American Gigolo, Firefox), pancreatic cancer.
- Gul Mohammad, 70, Pakistani cricketer, liver cancer.
- Sergey Obraztsov, 90, Russian puppeteer.
- Otto Šimánek, 67, Czechoslovak actor.
- Ted Smith, 63, American Olympic cyclist (1948).

=== 9 ===
- Hernán Bolaños, 80, Nicaraguan-Costa Rican football player.
- Keith Bissell, 80, Canadian composer.
- Tom Chessell, 78, Australian rower and Olympic medalist (1952).
- Otto Kohn, 84, German Olympic long-distance runner (1928).
- Carmine Lombardozzi, 79, American mobster and member of the Gambino crime family.
- Helmi Moustafa, 80, Egyptian Olympic footballer (1936).
- Fred Nimz, 78, American basketball player.
- Mehman Sayadov, 19, Azerbaijani soldier and war hero, killed in action.

=== 10 ===
- Fawzi Chaaban, 61, Egyptian Olympic athlete (1952).
- Egil Endresen, 72, Norwegian judge and politician.
- John Lund, 81, American actor (A Foreign Affair, To Each His Own, The Perils of Pauline).
- Werner Nilsen, 88, Norwegian-American soccer player.
- K. G. Ramanathan, 71, Indian mathematician.
- Jerzy Schindler, 69, Polish Olympic alpine skier (1948).
- Tom Seats, 81, American baseball player (Detroit Tigers, Brooklyn Dodgers).
- Sylvia Syms, 74, American singer, heart attack.
- Willard Long Thorp, 92, American economist.

=== 11 ===
- Judith Brown, 60, American dancer and sculptor.
- Adolf Fehr, 88, Swiss Olympic field hockey player (1928, 1936).
- René Guajardo, 59, Mexican professional wrestler, liver cancer.
- Loretta Cessor Manggrum, 95, American pianist and composer of sacred music.
- William A. Mueller, 91, American sound engineer.
- Curtis D. Summers, 62, American engineer and roller coaster designer.
- Prince Tsuneyoshi Takeda, 83, Japanese member of the imperial family, heart attack.

=== 12 ===
- Joe Burke, 68, American baseball executive, lymphatic cancer.
- Nikos Gatsos, 80, Greek poet, translator and lyricist.
- Jacqueline Maillan, 69, French actress, heart attack.
- Hector McIvor, 91, Australian politician.
- Bob Mizer, 70, American photographer and filmmaker.
- Lenny Montana, 66, American actor (The Godfather, Fingers), professional wrestler (GCW) and mobster, heart attack.
- Les Pabst, 75, Australian rules footballer.
- Robert Reed, 59, American actor (The Brady Bunch, The Defenders, Roots), colon cancer.
- Paul Sokody, 77, American basketball player.
- Win Williams, 69, American football player.

=== 13 ===
- Patrick Angus, 38, American painter, AIDS.
- Bob Burkard, 70, American Olympic soccer player (1952).
- Gisela Elsner, 55, German novelist, suicide by jumping.
- Stan Hugill, 85, British folk music performer.
- Dawon Kahng, 61, Korean-American electrical engineer and inventor.
- Leon Klatzkin, 77, American music arranger, composer, and conductor.
- F. E. McWilliam, 83, Northern Irish sculptor, cancer.
- Valentino Pellarini, 72, Italian Olympic basketball player (1948).
- Wanda Rutkiewicz, 49, Polish mountain climber, climbing accident.
- Bart Zoet, 49, Dutch Olympic cyclist (1964), heart attack.

=== 14 ===
- Lyle Alzado, 43, American football player (Denver Broncos, Cleveland Browns, Los Angeles Raiders), brain cancer.
- Helge Helgesen, 79, Norwegian footballer.
- Robert Howie, 93, Scottish rugby player.
- Frank M. Karsten, 79, American politician, member of the U.S. House of Representatives (1947–1969).
- Nie Rongzhen, 92, Chinese general.

=== 15 ===
- Tommy Colella, 73, American gridiron football player (Detroit Lions, Cleveland Rams, Cleveland Browns).
- Ladislav Demšar, 63, Yugoslav basketball player and coach.
- Jovy Marcelo, 27, Filipino racing driver, racing accident.
- Bartlett Mullins, 87, British actor.
- Robert Morris Page, 88, American physicist, heart failure.
- Gino Rossetti, 87, Italian football manager, player, and Olympian (1928).
- Jalil Safarov, 30, Azerbaijani soldier, killed in battle.
- Parviz Samedov, 22, Azerbaijani soldier, killed in battle.

=== 16 ===
- Joe Healey, 81, American Olympic hurdler (1932).
- Preacher Henry, 81, American baseball player.
- Leon Jensz, 76, Polish Olympic sailor (1936).
- Marisa Mell, 53, Austrian actress, throat cancer.
- Eric James, Baron James of Rusholme, 83, British educator.
- Chalino Sánchez, 31, Mexican singer-songwriter, murdered.
- Jaap Stenger, 84, Dutch Olympic rower (1928).
- Robert Grainger Ker Thompson, 76, British military officer and counter-insurgency expert.

=== 17 ===
- Robert Blanc, 47, French footballer.
- Luigi Consonni, 86, Italian Olympic cyclist (1932).
- George Hurrell, 87, American photographer, bladder cancer.
- William Ivey, 72, American painter, cancer.
- Len Ortman, 66, Canadian football player (Saskatchewan Roughriders).
- Leopold Schädler, 66, Liechtensteiner Olympic alpine skier (1948, 1956).
- Želimir Vidović, 38, Bosnian football player, murdered.
- Lawrence Welk, 89, American musician and television personality (The Lawrence Welk Show), pneumonia.

=== 18 ===
- Margaret Birtwistle, 66, British Olympic track and field athlete (1948).
- Brownlow Eve, 87, Bermudian Olympic sailor (1956, 1960).
- Rudolf Klupsch, 86, German Olympic sprinter (1936).
- Jake Leicht, 72, American gridiron football player.
- Giuliani G. De Negri, 71, Italian film producer and screenwriter.
- Jasper K. Smith, 86, American attorney and politician.
- Skip Stephenson, 52, American comedian, heart attack.
- Marshall Thompson, 66, American actor, heart failure.

=== 19 ===
- Esther Averill, 89, American author.
- Miguel Camberos, 86, Mexican Olympic javelin thrower (1932).
- Olavi Heinonen, 70, Finnish Olympic diver (1952).
- Alfred McClung Lee, 85, American sociologist.
- Claude Roussel, 50, French Olympic bobsledder (1968).
- Jock Turner, 48, Scottish rugby player.
- Hans Vogt, 81, German composer.

=== 20 ===
- Roger Keith Coleman, 33, American convicted murderer, execution by electric chair.
- Giovanni Colombo, 89, Italian Cardinal of the Roman Catholic Church.
- Leela Sumant Moolgaokar, 75, Indian social worker.
- James Tully, 76, Irish politician.
- Alicia Vergel, 64, Filipina actress.

=== 21 ===
- Ulric Cole, 86, American pianist, editor, music educator and composer.
- T. B. Ilangaratne, 79, Sri Lankan politician, author, dramatist, and theater actor.
- Åke Lindblom, 73, Swedish Olympic sports shooter (1956).
- Mugs Stump, 42, American mountaineer, mountaineering accident.

=== 22 ===
- Tony Accardo, 86, American mobster and Chicago Outfit boss, cardiopulmonary failure.
- Roy Childs, 43, American political essayist, fall.
- Elizabeth David, 78, British cookery writer, stroke.
- Dan Enright, 74, American television producer, cancer.
- Zellig S. Harris, 82, American linguist.
- Frank Hurley, 76, Australian rugby league footballer.
- Abraham Moles, 71, French information scientist.
- György Ránki, 84, Hungarian composer.
- Iosif Varga, 50, Romanian football player.
- Lee Yang-ji, 37, Japanese novelist, myocarditis.

=== 23 ===
- James Blair, 82, American rower and Olympic champion (1932).
- Kostas Davourlis, 44, Greek footballer, heart attack.
- Giovanni Falcone, 53, Italian magistrate, assassinated, car bomb.
- John Gates, 78, American communist politician.
- William Keene, 76, American actor.
- Charley Malone, 81, American gridiron football player (Boston/Washington Redskins).
- Francesca Morvillo, 46, Italian magistrate, assassinated, car bomb.
- Paul Moukila, 41, Congolese football player, malaria.
- Henry George Pearce, 74, Australian politician.
- Ernst Plischke, 88, Austrian-New Zealand architect, town planner and furniture designer.
- Ľudovít Rado, 77, Slovak footballer.
- Jack Webb, 86, Australian rules footballer.
- Atahualpa Yupanqui, 84, Argentine musician.

=== 24 ===
- Jean Aberbach, 81, Austrian-American music publisher.
- Francis Thomas Bacon, 87, English engineer.
- Luiz Eça, 56, Brazilian samba and bossa nova pianist.
- Adolf Hoch, 81, Austrian architect.
- Ken Hogan, 40, Australian rules footballer.
- Joan Sanderson, 79, British actress.

=== 25 ===
- Danny Biasone, 83, Italian-American sports executive.
- Tulio Demicheli, 77, Argentine filmmaker, cancer.
- Otto Denning, 79, American baseball player (Cleveland Indians).
- Sari Dienes, 93, Hungarian-American artist.
- Viktor Grishin, 77, Soviet politician, heart attack.
- Philip Habib, 72, American diplomat, cardiac arrhythmia.
- Gitta Mallasz, 84, Hungarian artist.
- Harvey Murphy, 76, American football player (Cleveland Rams).
- Ruben Zakharian, 90, Russian painter.

=== 26 ===
- Edmund Beloin, 82, American writer of radio, film, and television.
- Terence Clarke, 88, British Army officer and politician.
- Joe Davis, 72, American football player.
- Dorota Horzonkówna, 58, Polish Olympic gymnast (1952, 1956).
- Wally Miller, 74, Australian rules footballer.
- George Morrow, 66, American jazz bassist.
- Geneva Sayre, 80, American bryologist and bibliographer.

=== 27 ===
- Machiko Hasegawa, 72, Japanese manga artist.
- Peter Jenkins, 58, British journalist, respiratory failure.
- Karl Leyser, 71, German-British historian.
- John Myhers, 70, American actor (How to Succeed in Business Without Really Trying, 1776, History of the World, Part I), pneumonia.
- Delilah Pierce, 88, American artist, curator and educator.
- Thomas Reddy, 62, Irish Olympic boxer (1952).
- Donald K. Ross, 81, American naval officer, heart attack.
- Franz Rupp, 91, German-American pianist.
- Jone Salinas, 74, Italian actress.
- Michael Talbot, 38, American quantum mystic, lymphoid leukemia.

=== 28 ===
- Ricardo Caminos, 75-76, Argentine egyptologist.
- Fumio Fujimura, 75, Japanese baseball player.
- Bai Hong, 72, Chinese singer.
- Godefroid Munongo, 66, Congolese politician.
- Charley Schanz, 72, American baseball player (Philadelphia Phillies, Boston Red Sox).
- Lorenzo Tañada, 93, Filipino lawyer, civil rights advocate and politician.

=== 29 ===
- Joe Dell, 76, Australian rules footballer.
- Sinforiano García, 67, Paraguayan footballer.
- Ollie Halsall, 43, English guitarist, drug-induced heart attack.
- Yoshitoshi Mori, 93, Japanese artist.
- Sel Murray, 74, Australian rules footballer.
- Albert Ndongmo, 65, Cameroonian prelate of the Catholic Church.
- Nils-Åke Sandell, 65, Swedish football player, manager and Olympian (1952).
- Ken Suesens, 75, American basketball coach.
- Petro Udovychenko, 78, Ukrainian politician and diplomat.

=== 30 ===
- Karl Carstens, 77, German politician, President of West Germany (1979–1984).
- Larry Craig, 75, American football player (Green Bay Packers).
- Craig Ellwood, 70, Los Angeles-based modernist architect.
- Mitsuharu Inoue, 66, Japanese writer, colorectal cancer.
- James Lamy, 64, American bobsledder and Olympic medalist (1956, 1964).
- Elly Yunara, 68, Indonesian film actress and producer.
- Antoni Zygmund, 91, Polish mathematician.

=== 31 ===
- Eugene A. Chappie, 72, American politician, member of the U.S. House of Representatives (1981–1987).
- Henri Moreau de Melen, 89, Belgian politician.
- Walter Neugebauer, 71, Croatian comic book artist and animator.
- Lillian Powell, 96, Canadian-American dancer.
- Dieter Puschel, 52, German cyclist.
- Karl Schnell, 92, American baseball player (Cincinnati Reds).
- Lutz Stavenhagen, 52, German politician, pneumonia.
