= Abarsal =

Abarsal ((aBAR.SAL_{4}^{ki})) was a city-state of Mesopotamia in the area of the Euphrates. The city was contested by the greater powers of Mari and Ebla in the Early Bronze Age. Its location is unknown.

== Location ==
The site of Tell Chuera has been suggested. In the area north of Carchemish and at the site of Til Barsip have also been proposed. More recently Tall Bazi has been suggested. Additionally, Kazane Höyük has been proposed.

== History ==
Very little is known of the history of the town.

=== Early Bronze IIIB ===
Around 2420 BC, Iblul-Il was called King of Mari Abarsal. Under Ebla ruler Irkab-Damu, Vizier of Ebla Ibrium (24th-century BC) campaigned against the city of Abarsal during the time of vizier Arrukum. A document from the reign of Lrkab-Damu reports giving clothes to the messenger reporting the defeat of Armi and to the messenger reporting the defeat of Abarsal "Da-wi-du; clothes: his representative(s), (who brought) the news of the defeat of Abarsal.

=== Early Bronze IVA ===
The Treaty between Ebla and Abarsal has been discovered in Ebla archives. The treaty appears to define a vassalage for Abarsal to Ebla. The treaty introduction lists the cities under the control of Ebla. The treaty obligates Abarsal to denounce any conspiracy against the ruler of Ebla A number of the sections of the treaty cover matters of crime and punishment. For example, "the penalty for the killing in a fight of a person from Ebla or from Abarsal is the payment of fifty sheep".
