= Dugurasu =

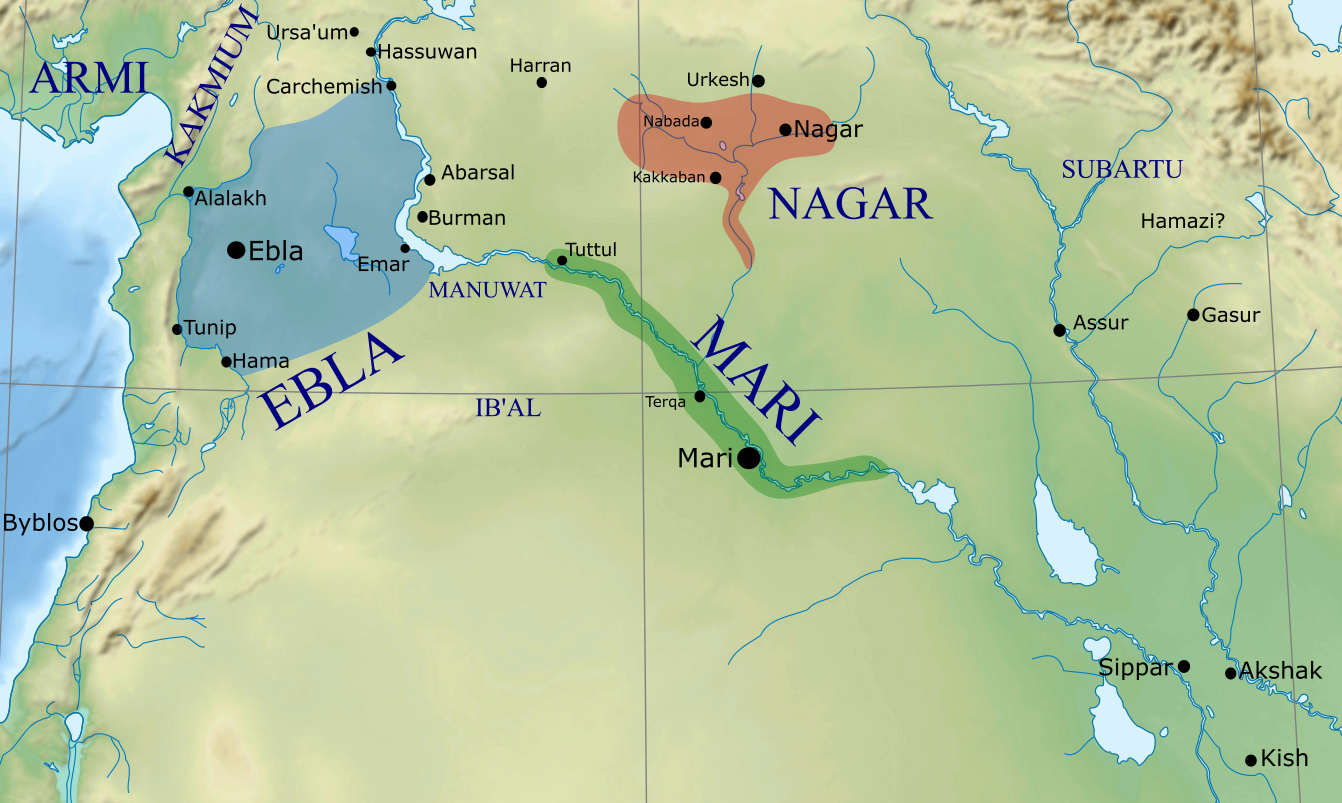
Ebla in the third Millenium

The polity of Dugurasu (Du-gú-ra-su^{ki}, rarely Du-gú-ra-zu^{ki}"), whether city or region is unclear, was a major trading party of the 3rd millennium BC city of Ebla, mentioned 51 times in extant texts, most from the time of Ebla ruler Išar-Damu (c. 2300 BC). Its location is unknown with most proposals favoring south in the area of Egypt but far to the east toward Elam also was suggested at one point. In this period Ebla had a wide trading network extending through Syria and northern Mesopotamia. The most common materials sent to Dugurasu were silver, tin, and gemstones like lapis lazuli. It is known that Dugurasu was a supplier of gold to Ebla, though in volume after Armi, Gablul, and Dub. The gold, coming largely in years 9-11 of Ebla vizier Ibrium during the reign of Išar-Damu, was mostly in unprocessed form. Elephant and hippopotamus ivory, copper, bronze, and linen textiles were also sent to Ebla. Most of the commerce between Ebla and Dugurasu was handled by traders from IB.MAH and Kakmiʾum (Kak-mi-um^{ki}). Both of those polities are unlocated though seminomadic pastoralists living in the steppes south of Ebla has been suggested for the former and the coastal area north of Ebla for the later. Little is known of Kakmi'um despite it being the 3rd largest trading partner of Ebbla, after Mari and Armi. Envoys of Ebla and Dugurasu traveled back and forth, conveyed along with trading parties, and official gifts were given.

Most of the trade between Dugurasu and Ebla came through the polity of DUlu (Du-lu^{ki}) to the south, known to be a tributary of Ebla at that time. It is known that DUlu merchants made trips to Dugurasu independently as well. Egypt had a long history of trading with Byblos with its large harbor. Current consensus identifies DUlu with Byblos or possibly another intermediate trading center to the south. In any case, determining at least the areal location of DUlu is important in determining the location of Dugurasu.

== Sources ==
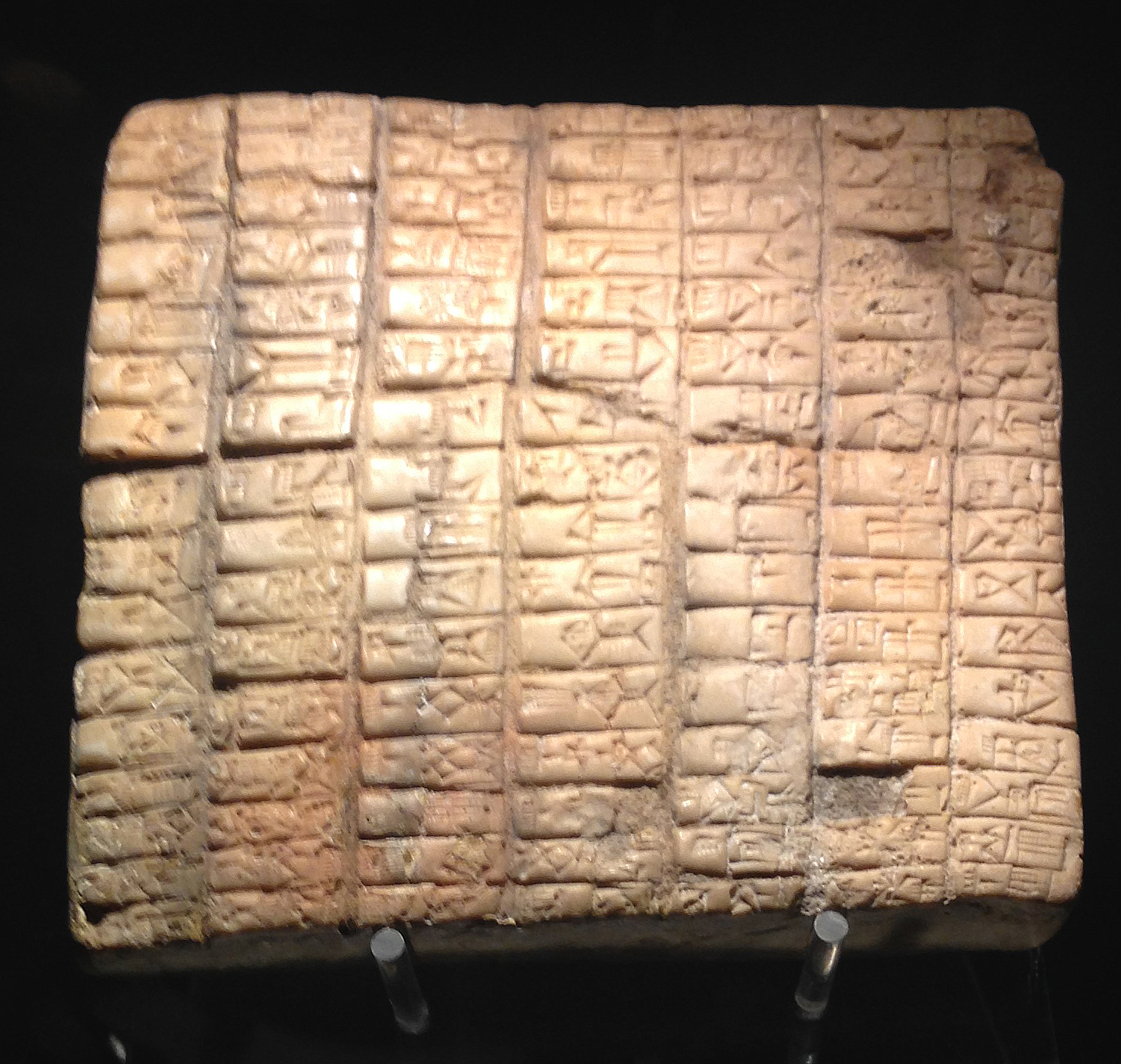
Cuneiform tablet from the archives of the Royal Palace of Ebla

Known textual mentions of Dugurasu began during the time of Arrukum, minister of King Irkab-Damu, 40 years before the fall of Ebla but most come from the final 10 years of the First Kingdom of Ebla (c. 2400-2300 BC) leading up to its destruction, presumably by Naram-Sin of Akkad. Most delegations from Dugurasu were led by a ʾA_{3}-wa (alternate spellings ꜢAwa, A-wa, A-ʾa_{3}-wa, A-a-wa, and Ur-wa), accompanied by his son. Two other natives of Dugurasu, A_{3}-ti-bu_{3} and Gur-ša-NE, are mentioned in texts. One of the relevant traders of Kakmi'um is known by name, I_{3}-lum-BALA, later replaced by his son, Ru_{12}-zi-ma-lik. From DUlu the name of a trader Ar-ra-ti-lu and a king Gi-dar-du-lum are known. A trader from IB.MAH was named Za-na-ga and two men of DUlu, Lušaradu and Iddin-Kamiš—DUlu, are also mentioned. The current thinking was that in one trade route IB.MAH handled the traditional overland route to Egypt while DUlu worked the known sea route to Egypt. The other trade path was overland to Kakmi'um then by sea to Dugurasu, possibly with a stop at DUlu (coasting was the standard for sea travel in that period) with trade from Dugurasu taking the return path.

Ancient Orient around 2400 BC

An example of an official gift to Dugurasu came in Ibriham year 10 (a mina is about half a kilogram):

"2 mina of silver, 2 minas of tin, 2 minas of lapis lazuli: gift (for) the king of Dugurasu"

and in another text (am is usually considered to be elephant):

"... 5 horns of am ... gift for the king (of Ebla) from the king of Dugurasu"

Most trade was in metals, linens, and decorative materials like lapis lazuli, typically given to a trader intermediary, who is remunerated. An example (mar-tu taken as Amorite, type of dagger):

"10 shekels of tin to be alloyed with 70 shekels of refined copper for making 3 daggers mar-tu (for) a chief of Ibal who went (to) Dugurasu to hand over (these items); 20 shekels of silver: his travel provisions"

== Location ==
=== Egypt region ===
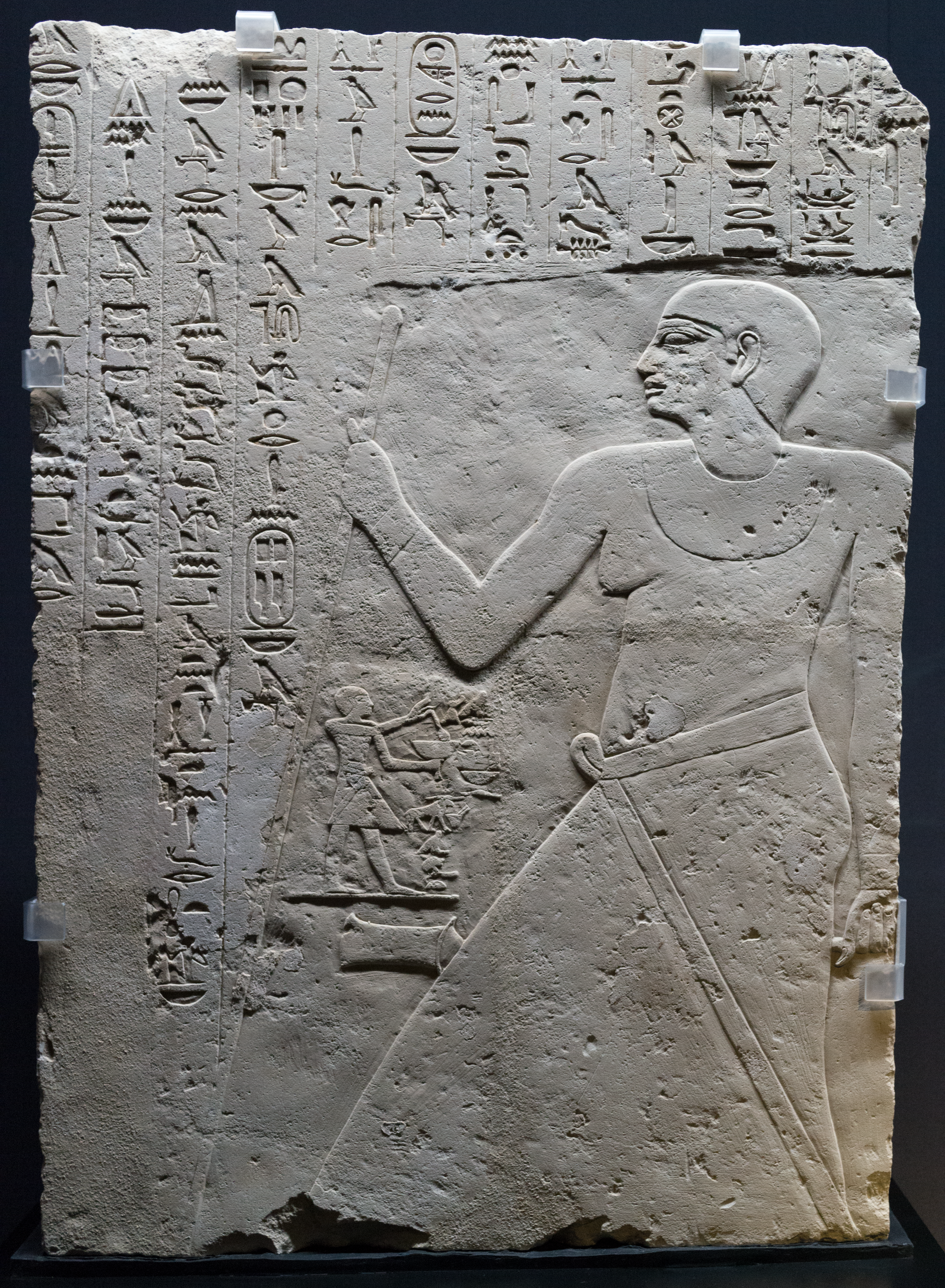
Tomb Relief of Iny, Excavated at Saqqara, Egypt - Limestone, Old Kingdom, 6th dynasty, 23rd century BC

The country of Egypt itself as well as Kerma, at that time under the control of the Kingdom of Kush have been suggested as the location of Dugurasu. The delta of Egypt had a history of trade with the eastern Mediterranean at least back to the beginning of the 3rd millennium BC at sites like Tell el-Farkha. The possibility has also been raised that Dugurasu is some intermediary trading polity between Ebla and Egypt. Egyptian stone vessels from Dynasty 5 and 6, some inscribed, were found at Ebla. There is no accepted reference to Ebla in texts Egypt. It was proposed that Dugurasu was rendered phonetically as "rʾ.w-ḥꜢ.wt", a known toponym in Egypt though this has gained little support. It is known that trade with the eastern Mediterranean was occurring during this period with Egypt. A stone built chapel of Iny, an official of pharaoh Pepi I Meryre, reported journeys to the region holding Ebla. The chapel was looted and dismantled, ending up on the antiquities market. In one passage Iny reports

"... I was sent to Byblos by the Person of my lord Mernerê. I brought three Byblos ships and made the big Palace boats. I brought lapis lazuli, tin, silver, bitumen and every gift that his ka wished, so that I was praised therefore in the Palace and treasures were given to me. I went down to Byblos from R-ḥȝt and came back ..."

=== Well to the east ===
At one point it was suggested that Dugurasu was located well off to the east, possibly in Tukriš in Iranian Kurdistan. In general this proposal does not align with the textual sources for Eblan trade.

== See also ==
- Chronology of the ancient Near East
- Cities of the ancient Near East
- List of Mesopotamian dynasties
