= Vizier (Ebla) =

Title in the Syrian first Eblaite kingdom

Vizier (/vɪˈzɪər/ or /ˈvɪzɪər/), is the title used by modern scholars to indicate the head of the administration in the first Eblaite kingdom. The title holder held the highest position after the king and controlled the army. During the reign of king Isar-Damu, the office of vizier became hereditary.

== Title and responsibilities ==
Vizier is a rendering presented by Alfonso Archi to indicate the second in command official of Ebla, whose native title was probably "head of the administration" (lugal sa-za). Eblaite viziers' authority was of such importance that they were thought of as kings during the earliest stages of deciphering the tablets of Ebla, as the names of actual monarchs rarely appeared in administrative tablets. Aside from heading the administration, the vizier was in command of the kingdom's trade, army and acted as the head of provincial governors.

== History ==
The title was not created until after the period of king Igrish-Halam (fl c. 2360 BC), but high officials were already prominent during his reign, most importantly Darmiya and Tir (whose name appear on an important agreement named the Treaty between Ebla and Abarsal). The first vizier was Arrukum and he was appointed by king Irkab-Damu. He was followed by Ibrium who kept his office for 20 years, and managed to establish a parallel dynasty of viziers next to the royal family, being succeeded by his son Ibbi-Sipish.

=== Eblaite viziers ===
Vizier	Term	King	Comments
Arrukum	c. 2347 – c. 2342 BC	Irkab-Damu	Kept his office for five years, and had his son Ruzi-Malik marry princess Iti-Mut, the daughter of the king
Ibrium	c. 2342 – c. 2322 BC	Irkab-Damu, Isar-Damu	Served his first two years under Irkab-Damu
Ibbi-Sipish	c. 2322 – c. 2305 BC	Isar-Damu	Collaborated with his son Dubuhu-Ada, who was prevented from assuming his father's office by the destruction of Ebla.

== See also ==
- Vizier
