= Treaty between Ebla and Abarsal =

The Treaty between Ebla and Abarsal is a diplomatic treaty that was concluded between the Early Bronze Age city-states of Ebla and Abarsal. It was signed around 2350 BC, and may be the earliest recorded diplomatic treaty in human history. While the geographical location of Ebla is clear, the historians have so far not been able to identify the exact location of Abarsal. Among several hypotheses, Giovanni Pettinato prefers to see Abarsal as the future city of Assur, the capital of Assyria. However, the text indicates that it is a state bordering or close to Ebla with which it shares a common border. The site of Tell Chuera has also been proposed.

== Dating and chronology ==
The tablet containing the treaty was found in the archives of Ebla that survived the fire of the royal palace. Despite the difficulties encountered during the restoration of the cuneiform tablets, it was possible to date this treaty around the year 2350 BC, thanks to prosopographic studies of its writing.

The tablet has museum designation TM.75.G.2420 and Cuneiform Digital Library Initiative artifact number P241971.

This treaty was probably written at the time of King Irkab-Damu and his vizier Ibrium.

== Purpose of the treaty ==
The treaty regulates the relations between the states of Ebla and Abarsal, located along a river in Upper Mesopotamia. It mentions the transport of goods, including olive oil and wine, by river boat, and overland by donkey caravans.

The text of the Treaty addresses the following issues.

- Division of areas of influence between Ebla and Abarsal. It is significant that the areas of influence of Ebla are delimited, but not those of Abarsal. This may indicate that in the treaty that was signed, Ebla was the dominant state.
- Issues related to taxes, payments and tributes.
- Information regarding the officials, and administrative positions such as the functions of the Prefect of the Palace.
- Issues related to cattle farming.
- Issues related to trade. Special attention is paid to this aspect. It is said that Lu'atim must be a border city where trade between both countries takes place and therefore this city must be close to the border. The city seems to be in the territory of Ebla, which would reinforce the idea that Ebla was the power that benefited the most from the treaty. In this city there was an official, called TIR, who was in charge of supervising the commercial activities.
- There are also regulations on water and oil consumption as well as the issue of commercial invoicing.

Also other issues mentioned were relating to the manumission of slaves, and to water use.

== Proposed locations ==
Abarsal was apparently an important city located near a navigable river. Archi proposed that it may have been on the left bank of Euphrates. According to Astour, this could have been the location of Tell Ahmar, later known as Til-Barsip, with its important Euphrates crossing.

Scholars also point to the names of two villages, Zurigi and Abala, that are mentioned in an old cuneiform text in connection with "the superintendent of the city of Abarsal". These two place names seem to correspond to the modern villages of Zarqah and Billi in this area; these two villages are located 7km northeast of Tell Ahmar.

== See also ==
- Diplomacy in the Ancient Near East

== Bibliography ==
- (in German) D.O. Edzard, “Der Vertrag von Ebla mit A-Bar-QA”, in P. Fronzaroli (ed.), Literature and Literacy Language at Ebla, Florence, 1992, p. 187-217
