= Orthmann =

Orthmann is a surname. Notable people with the surname include:

- Ernst Gottlob Orthmann (1859–1922), German gynecologist
- Hanna Orthmann (born 1998), German volleyball player
- Hans-Jürgen Orthmann (born 1954), German long-distance runner
- Walter Orthmann (1922–2024), Brazilian textile worker
- Wilhelm Orthmann (1901–1945), German physicist
- Winfried Orthmann (born 1935), German archaeologist specializing in the Near East

== See also ==
- Ortmann
