= Ortman =

Ortman is a surname. Notable people with the surname include:

- George Earl Ortman (1926–2015), American painter, printmaker, constructionist and sculptor
- Julianne Ortman (born 1962), American politician
- Len Ortman (1926–1992), Canadian football player

== See also ==
- Ortmann, a surname
