= Corinne Mitchell =

American artist

- Born: Corinne Mildred Howard; 1914; Baskerville, Virginia
- Died: April 21, 1993 (aged 78–79); Washington, D.C.
- Known for: Artist, Educator

Corinne Mitchell (1914 - 21 April 1993) was an American painter and educator. She was the first African American to have a solo exhibit at the National Museum of Women in the Arts.

== Biography ==
Mitchell née Howard was born on March 10, 1914, in Baskerville, Virginia, the eleventh of eighteen children. She had shown artistic talent at an very young age. In the middle of doing chores, Mitchell would sketch whatever she could. With her parents noticing her talents, they encouraged her to pursue her talents. So when Mitchell turned 18, she left home to receive formal training.

She attended St Paul's College earning an associate degree in 1935, Virginia State College earning a B.A in 1951, and George Washington University earning an MA in 1965.

In 1938 she married William E. Mitchell. The couple located in Washington, D.C. in 1956. Mitchell went on to teach at Montgomery County Schools until 1982. She began to have trouble with the Administration of the schools due to harassment and discrimination. Through her civil rights activities Mitchell was acquainted with fellow Washington-area artists Loïs Mailou Jones, Delilah Pierce, and Alma Thomas.

In 1992 the National Museum of Women in the Arts held a solo exhibition Glimpse of Joy, which was NMWA's first solo exhibition of an African American woman's art. In 1993 the Charles Sumner School held a retrospective show of 29 of her paintings. Her work is in The Johnson Collection, Spartanburg, South Carolina.

Mitchell died April 21, 1993, in Washington, D.C.
