= Kevin O'Donovan =

Kevin O'Donovan may refer to:

- Kevin O'Donovan (Gaelic footballer)
- Kevin O'Donovan (basketball)
