= Ortmann =

Ortmann is the surname of the following persons:

- Andreas Ortmann (born 1953), German-born economist
- Anton Ortmann (1801–1861), Bohemian-Austrian botanist, with the botanical authority abbreviation Ortmann
- Arnold Edward Ortmann (1863–1927), German zoologist and botanist, with the botanical authority abbreviation A.E.Ortmann
- Chuck Ortmann (1929–2018), American football player
- Günther Ortmann (1916–2002), German handball player
- Oliver Ortmann (born 1967), German pool billiard player
- Siegfried Ortmann (1937–2023), German archer

== Other variants ==
- Ortman
- Orthmann
- Artner
