= Isar-Damu =

King of Ebla
- Tenure: c. 2340 - c. 2305 BC
- Predecessor: Irkab-Damu
- Successor: Possibly Ir'ak-Damu
- Died: c. 2305 BC
- Spouse: Tabur-Damu
- Issue: Ir'ak-Damu; Tagris-Damu
- Father: Irkab-Damu
- Mother: Dusigu

Isar-Damu (died c. 2305 BC), was the king (Malikum) of the first Eblaite kingdom. Isar-Damu fought a long war with Mari which ended in Eblaite victory; he was probably the last king of the first kingdom.

== Reign ==
Isar-Damu succeeded his father Irkab-Damu as a young child; his mother, Dusigu, seems to have taken advantage of her position as her husbands favorite wife and her probable familial relation to the powerful vizier Ibrium in order to elevate her son to the throne, despite him being one of Irkab-Damu's youngest sons.

The first years of Isar-Damu's reign were dominated by his mother and the vizier; texts from Ebla show that Isar-Damu's name appeared on official documents after that of his mother. Ibrium was the commander of the army and he conducted multiple campaigns against rebellious vassal-rulers or neighboring kingdoms.

Isar-Damu concluded an alliance with Nagar and the relations progressed toward a dynastic marriage between princess Tagrish-Damu, Isar-Damu's daughter, and prince Ultum-Huhu, Nagar's monarch's son. In year seven of Ibrium's term, Nagar was defeated by Mari, causing the blockage of trade routes between Ebla and southern Mesopotamia via upper Mesopotamia.

Ibrium became vizier two years prior to Isar-Damu's reign and kept his office for 20 years, dying in Isar-Damu's 18th regnal year; three years later, queen mother Dusigu died. Following Ibrium's death, an Eblaite campaign was sent against Alalakh. Isar-Damu concluded an alliance with Nagar and Kish against Mari, and the campaign was headed by the Eblaite vizier Ibbi-Sipish, Ibrium's son, who led the combined armies to victory in a battle near Terqa. Afterwards, the alliance attacked the rebellious Eblaite vassal city of Armi.

== Succession ==
Isar-Damu ruled 35 years, and his main wife was Tabur-Damu but his crown prince Ir'ak-Damu was his son by an earlier consort whose name is unknown. Although Isar-Damu is generally considered Ebla's first kingdom last monarch, his son Ir'ak-Damu, who was married to Za'ase, Ibbi-Sipish's daughter, might have succeeded him for a short period.

King Isar-Damu of Ebla
Regnal titles
Preceded by Irkab-Damu	King of Ebla c. 2340 - c. 2305 BC	Succeeded by Possibly Ir'ak-Damu

== See also ==
- Ebla tablets
- Cities of the ancient Near East
- Eblaite-Mariote war
