= DC Waterfront, Maine Avenue =

1957 painting by Delilah Pierce

- Artist: Delilah Pierce
- Year: 1957
- Medium: Oil on board
- Dimensions: 45 cm × 59.8 cm (18 in × 23.5 in)
- Location: Smithsonian American Art Museum, Washington, D.C.

DC Waterfront, Maine Avenue is a painting by Delilah Pierce, a native Washingtonian. It is in the collection of the Smithsonian American Art Museum in Washington, D.C. in the United States.

Pierce used oil paint on board, in 1957, to depict Maine Avenue along the Southwest Waterfront in Washington, D.C. The painting depicts multiple buildings in the background, one with umbrellas in front of it. In the foreground, Pierce painted boats in the Potomac River, dockside. The influence of European impressionism and post-impressionism has been noted in this painting, which is one of several works by Pierce that explore urban life.

DC Waterfront, Maine Avenue was purchased by the Smithsonian in 2009 using Deaccession Funds.

The artwork was included in the 2005 exhibit, Delilah W. Pierce: Natural Perspective, at the University of Maryland University College.
