= Diplomacy in the ancient Near East =

The greater ancient Near East (including Egypt) offers some of the oldest evidence of the existence of international relations, since it was there that states first developed (the city-states and empires of Mesopotamia, the Levant, and Egypt) around the 4th millennium B.C.E. Almost 3000 years of the evolution of diplomatic relations are thus visible in sources from the ancient Near East. However, because only certain periods are well documented within that timespan, there remain many gaps in the modern study of diplomacy in this era.

== Evolution of diplomatic relations ==
The diplomatic relations of the ancient Near East are known only in a fragmented fashion. A limited number of texts allow us to understand relatively well the contemporary diplomatic practices of certain decades, spread out across more than two millennia and large geographical distances. Long periods with little or no documentation are broken up by brief periods of abundant documentation. However, this does not prevent us from understanding the broad threads and general trends in the evolution of international relations, for it follows the evolution of politics itself, which is known in general terms.

=== Ancient states period ===
Diplomatic relations have existed for as long as human communities have been organized into political units, which precedes the period of this study. The first Near Eastern states formed during the 4th millennium B.C.E., but international relations during this era are unknown due to a lack of documentation.

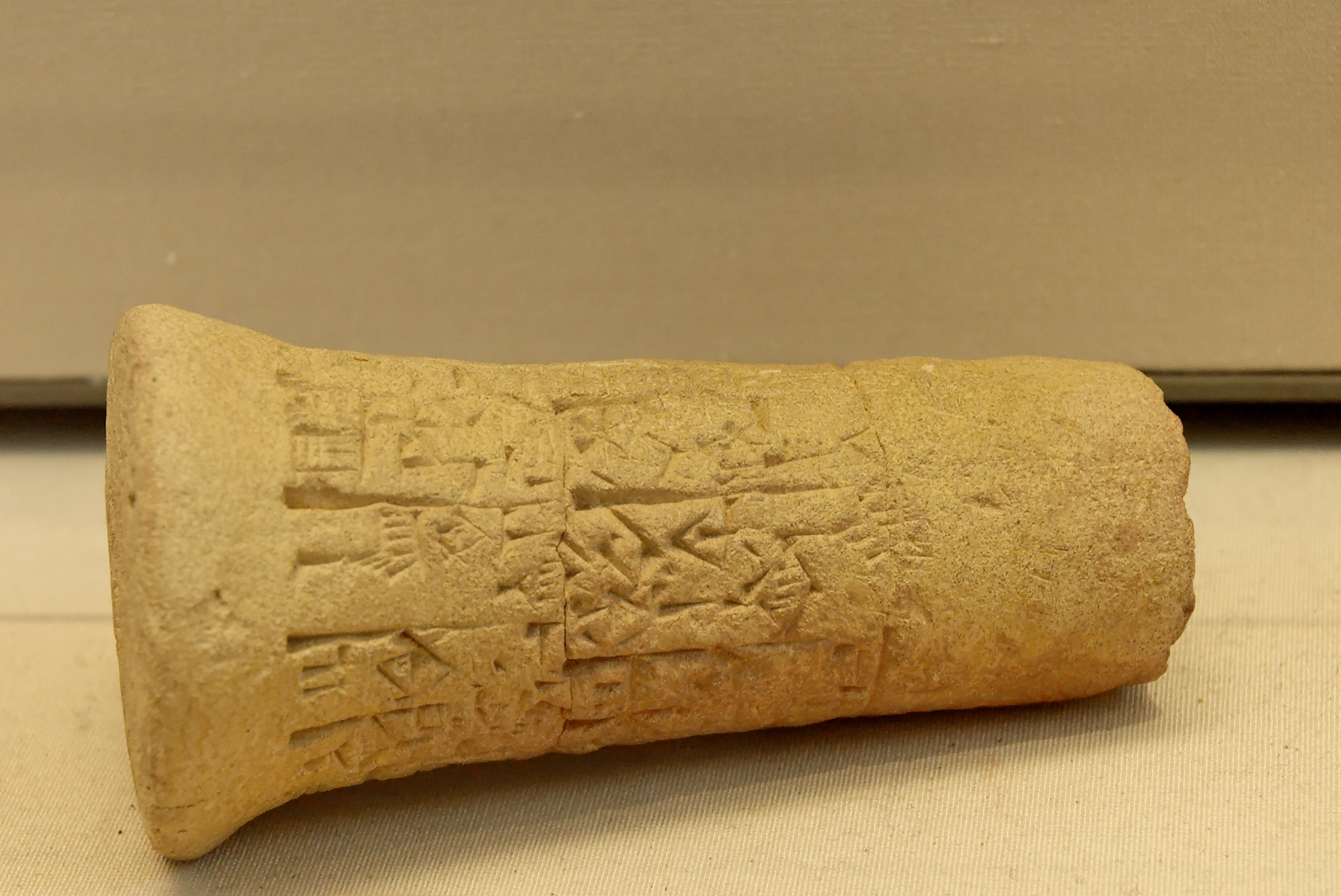
Foundation nail commemorating the peace treaty concluded between Entemena of Lagash and Lugal-kinishe-dudu of Uruk

The first surviving documents on the subject of international relations appear towards the end of the Early Dynastic period of ancient Mesopotamia (2600-2340 B.C.E.). They relate to the Sumerian city-state of Lagash. Among them is the oldest known treaty, concluded between the king of Lagash (En-metena) and the king of Uruk. However, the richest of the records concern the series of conflicts between Lagash and its neighbor Umma between 2600 and 2350 B.C.E. The documents about these wars are primarily about the military aspects of the war, with little about the diplomatic side. They display the constant rivalries between the cities of southern Mesopotamia. These also appear in the epic stories of the kings of Uruk (Lugalbanda, Enmerkar, and Gilgamesh), which may describe real events. They show the antagonisms pushing Lagash against its rivals, Kish and Aratta. The city of Kish seemed to assert a hegemonic position at certain points— its king, Mesalim, intervened around 2600 to arbitrate in the conflict between Lagash and Umma, and the title of "King of Kish" was also assumed by kings of other cities as a sign of superiority.

The site which offers the most important diplomatic archives from this period are those from Ebla, in Syria. The kings of Ebla had contacts with neighboring kings, notably the powerful sovereigns of Mari and Nagar, but also with the kings of more distant regions, like Kish in Mesopotamia and Hamazi in western Iran. Excavations at Ebla have uncovered the oldest example of a written peace treaty, the Treaty between Ebla and Abarsal, as well as proof of matrimonial alliances between the local kings and certain of their allies.

=== The first empires ===
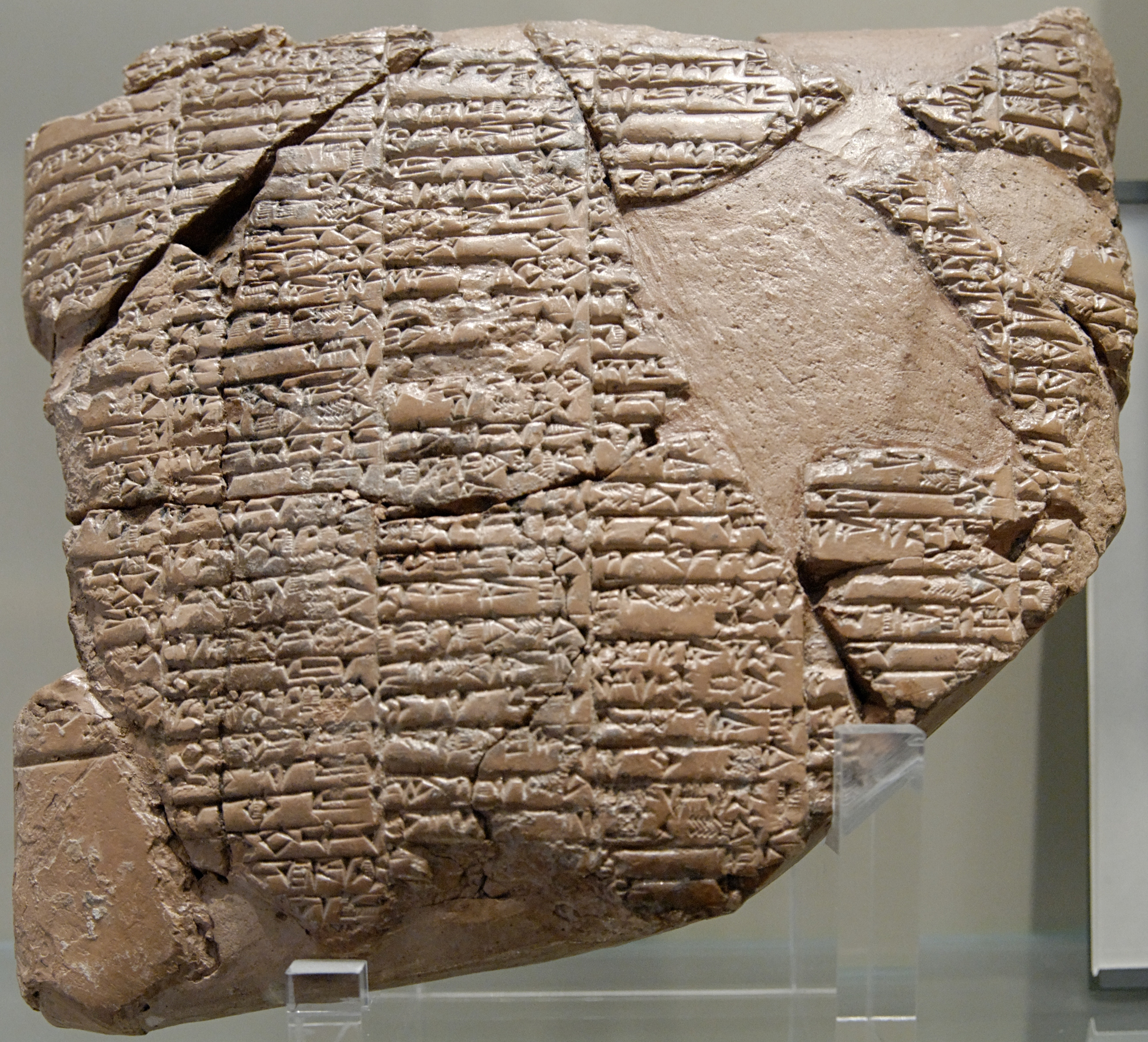
Treaty between Naram-Sin of Akkad and a sovereign of Awan, perhaps Khita, c. 2250 B.C.E., Musée de Louvre

Gradually, certain states in southern Mesopotamia were able to exercise hegemony over their neighbors for longer and longer, like Uruk under Enshakushana and above all Umma under Lugal-zagesi. This evolution was completed by Sargon of Akkad, who founded the first empire in 2340, comprising all of the Mesopotamian city-states, up to those of eastern Syria. The diplomatic relations of this period are not well known. There is a tablet which is inscribed with a peace treaty concluded between Naram-Sin of Akkad (Sargon's grandson) and the king of Awan, in southwest Iran, who was his vassal. This complete hegemony endured until the second half of the 22nd century B.C.E., when the Akkadian Empire collapsed. This vacuum was filled several decades later by the kings of the Third Dynasty of Ur, who founded in their turn the Neo-Sumerian Empire. These sovereigns were in communication with their neighboring kingdoms, and they regularly received embassies, and sent their own messengers. Their diplomatic service was controlled by a dignitary named SUKKAL.MAH. They combined their military expeditions onto the Iranian plateau with matrimonial politics, marrying their daughters to the kings of the regions (Anshan, Zabshali) in order to win their loyalty and solidify their own legitimacy. However, their empire ended in disintegration, and began a long period without a hegemonic empire, under the Amorite dynasties.

=== The second millennium: the balance of powers ===
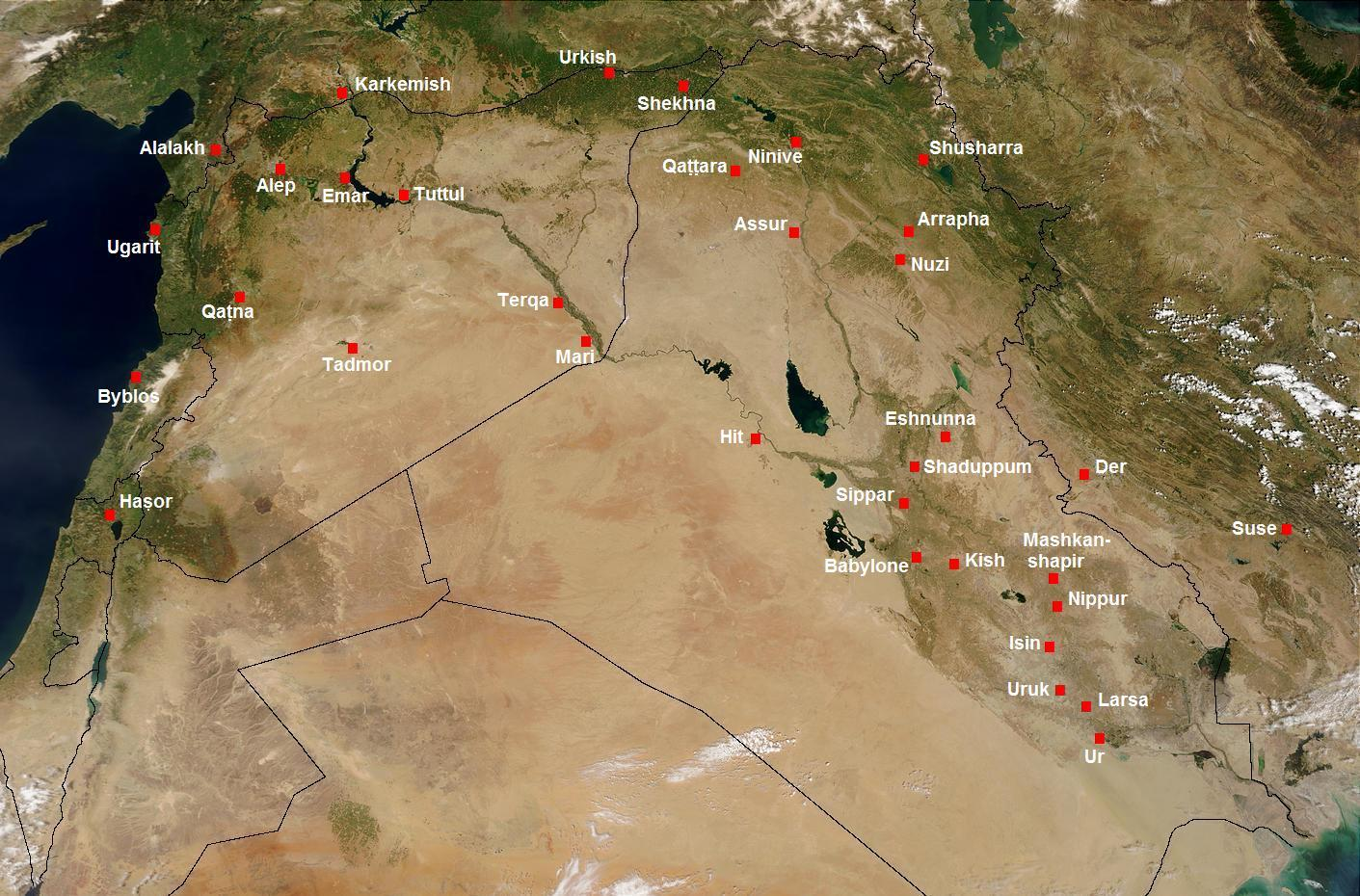
The Near East in the Old Babylonian epoch

The 2nd millennium was a period during which a relative power equilibrium was reached— no kingdom was able to exert power over its neighbors in a durable fashion. This allowed the gradual formation of more and more powerful and stable states, which dominated the international stage, and controlled a certain number of vassals, which tended to reduce over time. These vassals were the object of many rivalries between the dominant kingdoms, which sometimes resulted in overt conflict.

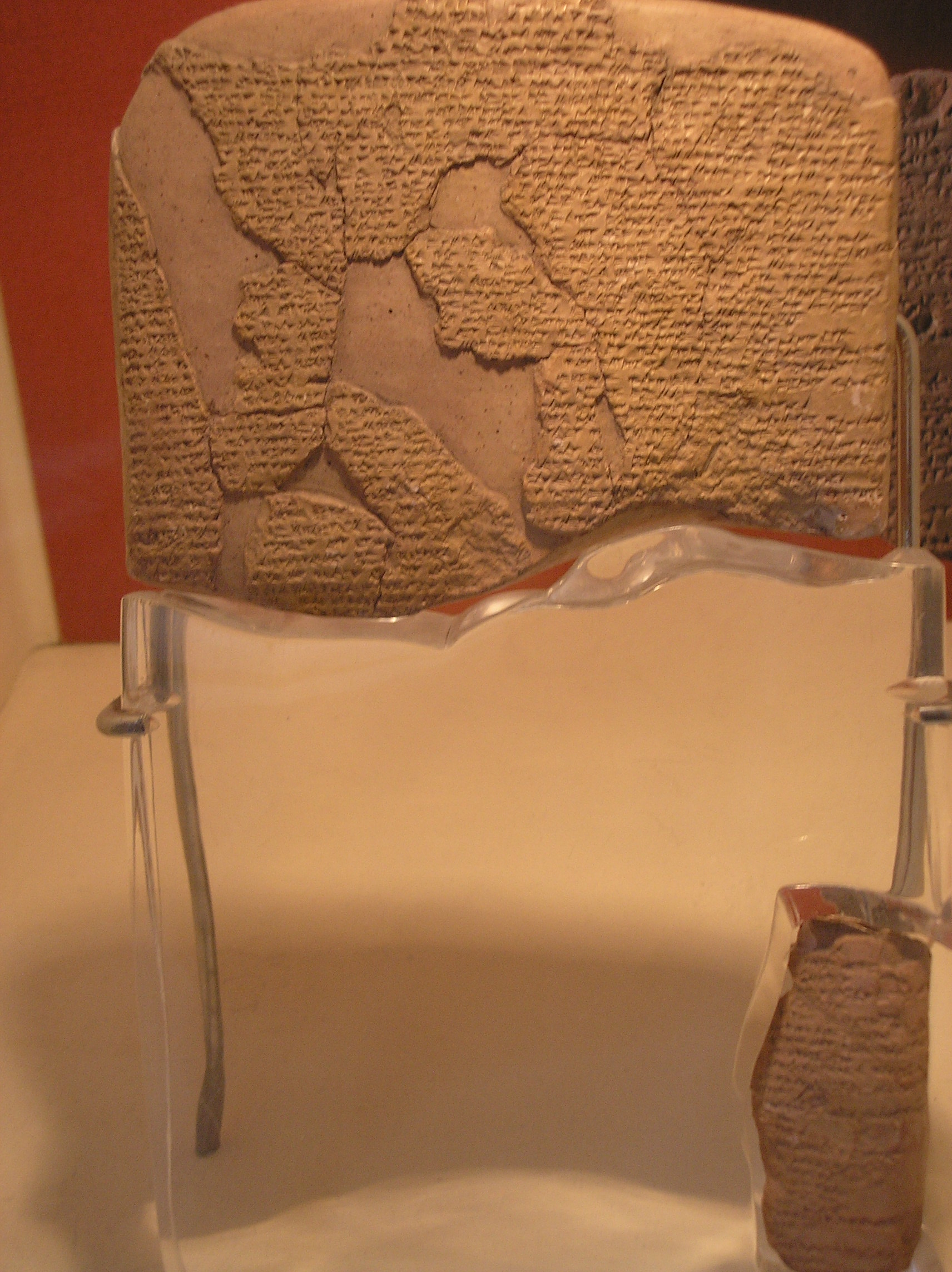
Copy of the Hittite version of the Egyptian–Hittite peace treaty between Ḫattušili III and Ramesses II, written in Akkadian and found at Hattusa (Istanbul Archaeology Museums)

The first half of the millennium was the era of the Amorite Kingdoms (2004-1595 B.C.E.), which formed a kind of koiné of political practices, similar from the Mediterranean to the Zagros foothills. Mesopotamia and Syria were dominated successively by many kingdoms— first by Isin and Larsa, who took the succession of Ur, but finally by Babylon, which imposed its hegemony under Hammurabi (1792–1750) and his successors, just as Elam failed to impose its power over Mesopotamia. In Syria, the dominant kingdom was that of Yamkhad (Aleppo), which profited from the dissipation of its neighbors Mari and Qatna (its greatest rival) over the course of the 18th and 17th centuries. The diplomatic practices of this era were documented mainly by the exceptional royal archives of Mari, dating from the first half of the 18th century (diplomatic correspondence, political accords, historical records), but also supplemented by the more minor archives of Tell Leilan, Tell Rimah, Kültepe, and others.

The end of the Amorite period was marked by the destruction of its two great kingdoms by the Hittites, who had reunited the kingdoms of eastern Anatolia in the last decades of the 17th century. At the same time, the Hurrians began to found increasingly powerful political entities, culminating in the formation of the kingdom of Mitanni. To these two were added Egypt. After the 18th dynasty had driven out the Hyksos, they invaded several decades later the Levant, expanding their empire their, bordering Mitanni. This marked a new era, with larger, more powerful, and more culturally diverse kingdoms. Most of the ancient Amorite kingdoms became vassals of the new rulers, with the exception of Babylon, which remained an important power under the Kassites (1595–1155). The sovereigns of these dominant kingdoms were considered as "great kings", equal among each other. Beginning in the 14th century, Assyria replaced Mitanni in this group. Elam could also be considered one of the great kingdoms of this period, at least in the 13th and 12th centuries. The diplomatic practices of this period are known thanks to several collections of exceptional importance: those of Hattusa, the Hittite capital (letters, diplomatic accords, historical chronicles), the letters of Amarna, in Egypt (international correspondence of the pharaohs Amenhotep III and Akhenaton), and the royal archives of Ugarit, a minor Syrian kingdom controlled first by Egypt and later by the Hittites. It is during this period that international relations are documented by the most abundant and geographically diverse sources.

The situation in the Middle East at the beginning of the period covered by the Amarna Letters. First half of the 14th century (left), and 13th century after the expansion of the Hittites and Assyrians (right).

=== The empires of the first millennium ===
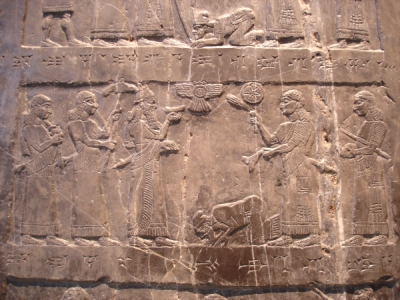
Bas-relief showing King Jehu of Judea prostrating himself before the Assyrian king Shalmaneser III, with the list of tributes given listed below.

The period of the "great kings" ended around 1200, with the arrival of great political changes, notably the successive migrations of the Sea Peoples and the Arameans, the collapse of the dominant kingdoms' power, and the creation of many smaller kingdoms in Syria, the Levant, and Anatolia, which were not under the control of any larger power. This transformation is known as the Late Bronze Age Collapse. The Books of the Prophets of the Hebrew Bible allow us to observe the relations of two of these states (Israel and Judea) with their neighbors.

Assyria was the only one of these great kingdoms to preserve its power and political stability enough to rebuild an empire starting at the end of the 10th century. In a little more than two centuries, Assyria imposed its control over most of the Near Eastern kingdoms around it. Only Babylon, Urartu, Elam, and Egypt were able to resist their domination, but they were eventually conquered as well. This period marked the beginning of great hegemonic empires in the Middle East. Because of this, Assyria did not seek to develop very strong diplomatic relations, opting instead to dominate its neighbors. Its relations with other kingdoms were mostly unequal. The foreign relations of the Assyrians, above all those with their vassals, are known from the archives of the Assyrian capitals (mainly Nineveh), complemented by sources from outside the core of the empire (notably the Hebrew Bible).

Between 614 and 609, Assyria was destroyed by an alliance between the Babylonians and the Medes, but the empire of the former did not last even a full century, since their real power did not compare with that of the Medes— the Achaemenid Persians. Under the leadership of Cyrus II, Cambyses, and Darius, they created a lasting empire, which outlasted the Assyrian and Babylonian empires. They did not tolerate any kingdom which purported to be their equal. This empire fell to the invasion of Alexander the Great between 333 and 330, who proved incapable of utilizing the Achaemenid heritage to his advantage, and at his death in 323 his generals divided up the empire. This was the beginning of the Hellenistic period, during which the Mediterranean and the Middle East were divided between several rival great kingdoms.

== Diplomatic practices ==
The different practices utilized in diplomatic relations in the ancient Near East are essentially known through the royal archives of the 2nd millennium, coming largely from four archaeological sites (Mari, Hattusa, Tell el-Amarna, and Ugarit), complemented by less numerous sources from the preceding millennium (Lagash, Ebla) and the following (Nineveh, Hebrew Bible). There seems to be a relative homogeneity and continuity in practices. However, this article mainly concerns the 2nd millennium, because of the available sources and because the international context at that time was more conducive to developments in international relations.

=== One big family ===
The kings of the 2nd millennium resembled one large family. The suzerains were the "fathers" (In Akkadian, abu(m)) of their vassals, who were called their "sons" (māru(m)). Between sovereigns of equal rank (great kings, or else vassals of the same king or of a king of equal rank), rulers were considered "brothers" (ahu(m)). The relationship between suzerain and vassal was also marked by the usage of the terms "master" and "servant" (bēlu(m) et (w)ardu(m)). The familial metaphor reflects the nature of the relationships, or at least the ideal relationships, between these sovereigns— they must have affection for one another, a father must protect his son, but on the other hand the latter must obey, respect, remain loyal, and offer a regular tribute. Equals must work to ensure they are always on equal footing, with reciprocity in their relations, with the principle of gift and counter-gift. Gradually, kings who didn't have suzerains (besides the gods) acquired a place apart, and in the second half of the second millennium they began to take the title of "great king" (šarru rābu), and formed a sort of very close "club" (to use the expression of H. Tadmor, reused by M. Liverani), which determined who could enter, as a function of their political successes. It was this that allowed Assur-uballit I of Assyria to take the place of Mitanni, after defeating them, but at the same place not Tarundaradu of Arzawa (in eastern Anatolia), who did not defeat the Hittites. Each king thus sought relations with their peers.

"'Tell the king of Egypt, my brother': thus spoke Assur-uballit, king of Assyria. 'For you, your house, for your country, your chariots and your soldiers, that all goes well. I am sending my messenger to see you and your country. Until now, my predecessors have not written; today I write to you. I have sent you a beautiful chariot, two horses, and a date of authentic lapis-lazuli, as a gift to you. Do not delay the messenger I have sent you, to visit you and return to me. So that he may see how you are and how your country is, so that he may return to me.'"

— The Assyrian king joins the "Great Powers' Club" (Amarna letter EA 15)

=== The agents of diplomacy: the messengers ===
The agents who conducted relations between royal courts were the messengers (Akkadian mār šipri(m)), empowered by the royal palaces. Sometimes they called on merchants traveling on their own business, or perhaps dignitaries of the realm, often accompanied by other dignitaries or by servants. These messengers were the key actors in diplomacy: they carried messages, gifts sent by their king, but were also empowered to negotiate potential political accords or future marriages between royal courts. Their autonomy varied according to circumstances— some were merely letter-carriers, but other were charged with a mission and could negotiate; other had the full power of their king by proxy (often those close to the king). It all depended on the degree of confidence which they inspired in their master.

These messengers traveled on foot, on donkeys, on chariots, or even ships. They were welcomed upon their arrival in their destination country, and were lodged in designated buildings by their hosts, rarely in their palace. Their daily needs were paid for. They could also have audiences before the sovereign, who received them, and deliver him presents on behalf of their sovereign. These audiences were public, and foreign envoys could attend them (even if they were enemies of those being given an audience). They frequently had to adjust diplomatic protocol between different hosts, knowing that the stakes were very high, with very serious consequences. The term of the visit was fixed by the host: certain messengers might have stayed for many months, or even one or two years, as in certain cases known from the letters of Amarna. A returning messenger was generally accompanied by a messenger of the host country, to ensure safe passage and to vouch for the information they carried.

"Say to my Master (Zimri-Lim of Mari): thus spoke La'um, your servant:

We have arrived for the feast before Hammurabi. We have entered the court of the palace. Zimri-Addu, myself, and Yarim-Addu, we three alone, they have clothed us, and the Yamkhadians who entered with us, they have clothed them all. As they have clothed all the Yamkhadians, while not having done so for the secretaries, servants of my master, I told Sin-bel-aplim (Babylonian official) on their behalf:

'Why this segregation on your part towards us, as if we were the sons of swine? We, of whom we are the servants and secretaries, of whom [are they]? We are all servants of a first-rank king. Why do you put foreigners the right with the left?'"

Protocol disputes between the ambassadors of Mari and Yamkhad at the court of Babylon in the reign of Hammurabi

There were no permanent ambassadors present in foreign courts, but certain dignitaries could specialize in relations with a specific court where they had residences and connections. An example of this was the Egyptian Mane, who traveled many times to the court of the Mitanni king Tushratta, in the era of Amarna. There were also specialists in international relations. These messengers in theory had an immunity, and when one was subjected to difficulties, or killed at the direction of the sovereign, there would be an outcry from the other kings. Two examples of laissez-passer reserved for these messengers have been found, at Mari and at Tell el-Amarna. Courts where foreign messengers passed without being received in audience were still obliged to house them: at Mari, they were referred to as being messengers "in passage" (ētiqum).

=== Royal Correspondence ===
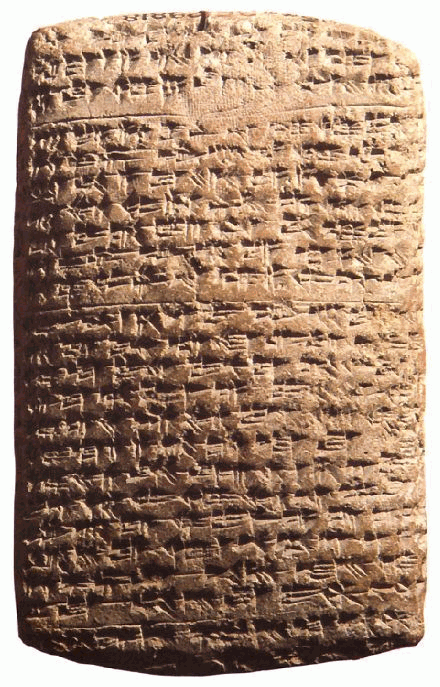
One of the tablets of the diplomatic correspondence found at Tell el-Amarna.

In order to allow the existence of proper relations between kings, without interpretive bias, written diplomatic tablets were required, of which many examples have been found at numerous archaeological sites. These messages were generally written in Babylonian Akkadian, the international language dating from the beginning of the 2nd millennium B.C.E., and begin in a very simple manner, with an introductory address naming the sender and the recipient (according to the common Akkadian formula ana X qibī-ma umma Y-ma: "to X say: ... thus spoke Y". During the second half of the 2nd millennium, these diplomatic messages contained very elaborate greetings, in which a great king would wish the happiness and prosperity of one of his peers and his house, or if he was a vassal, would reiterate the extent to which he submitted to him (for example, following the formula "I prostrate myself at your feet seven times and seven times more").

=== Exchange of gifts ===
"Say to Ishme-Dagan: thus spoke Ishkhi-Addu, your brother:

Here is an affair which one must not speak of but of which, in reality, I must speak and relieve my heart. You are acting like a sovereign king, you! You have reclaimed the two horses which you wanted and I sent them to you. So it is 20 minas of tin which you brought me. You must not have any desire without telling me of it! However, you have brought me very little tin! If at least you did not bring me anything! I swear by the god of my father how my heart was offended- the price of these horses now, here in Qatna, is 600 shekels- and you have given me 20 minas of tin. He who taught you, what would he say? Would he not mock us? This house is your house. What is lacking in yours? Does a brother not give a brother what he desires? If at least you had not sent me the tin would not have been offended! You are not the sovereign king! Why have you done this? This house here is your house!"

Letter from King Ishkhi-Addu of Qatna to Ishme-Dagan of Ekallatum

"12 baskets of dates, 3 baskets of pitted dates, 1 linen u-LAL(-garment), 2 linen bardul(-garments), 120 minas of copper by the standard <weight>, the queen of the land of Tilmun has sent for the queen of Lagaš."

Extract from a letter listing the presents sent by the queen of Tilmun to the queen Baranamtarra of Lagash (c. 2400 B.C.E.)

"Say to Nibhurrereya (Tutankhamun?), king of Egypt, my brother: thus spoke Burna-Buriash, king of Karduniash (Babylon), your brother.

All goes well for me. (I hope) for you, your house, your wives, your sons, your country, your Grands, your horses, your chariots, that all goes well!

Since my ancestors and yours proclaimed their mutual friendship, they have sent sumptuous presents, and never refused a request however magnificent. My brother has sent me two minas of gold as a gift. Now, if gold is abundant, sent me what your ancestors did, but if it is lacking, send me half that. Why have you sent me two minas of gold? Presently I am working on a very costly temple, and I am having problems bringing it to completion. Send me lots of gold. And on your side, whatever you want for your country, write me and tell me how I can bring it to you."

Exchange of gifts between the Babylonian and Egyptian kings, in an Amarna Letter (EA 9).

Royal envoys going to foreign courts were often charged with delivering presents to their hosts. A sovereign could extract a tribute from his vassal, regularly but also at a whim. These relations were thus asymmetric. But in the case of relations between two equals, the relationship had to be symmetrical: a present received had to be reciprocated by a present of the same value. It was a system of gifts and contra-gifts (šūbultum and šūrubtum in the Amorite period). This paradigm is summarized in a letter discovered at Mari, in which the king of Qatna complains to his counterpart in Ekallatum, because the latter had not sent him gifts of the same value as those which he had sent previously. The king of Qatna explains that this type of protest must not normally be made (the rules being unspoken etiquette), but that in this case he was almost inclined to take it as an affront, and that other sovereigns, upon learning of the incident, would think that he had come away from the exchange weaker than before. It was thus an affair of prestige, which was taken very seriously. In the era of Amarna, quarrels over the sending of gifts were common.

The goods exchanged often mirrored those one found in international commerce: Elam in the Amorrite period thus made presents of tin from the mines of the Iranian Plateau, as the king of Egypt in the Amarna era sent gold from Nubia, and that of Alashiya (without a doubt Cyprus) offered copper. These prized metals were the object of veritable negotiations in the Amarna letters, and kings negotiated fiercely over what was being sent, which seems to indicate a certain dependence with regard to these exchanges. Manufactured products— vases, jewels, jewelry, thrones, or chariots— were also found. Some believe that it amounted to disguised commerce, the contra-gift being the "price" paid for the gift, but this is debatable to the extent to which the desire for reciprocity remained present and dominant in these negotiations. The economic and symbolic aspects remain difficult to dissociate. Exchanges of diplomatic presents could concern other objects, notably artisanal works, but also exotic animals, or of course fine horses.

In specific cases, one could also send people to other courts. A vassal could be summoned to send servants to the court of his suzerain as tribute. Ramses II sent one of his doctors to the Hittite court of Hattusili III. In the era of Amarna, Tushratta of Mitanni sent the statue of the goddess Ishtar from Nineveh to Egypt, possibly to appease the pharaoh Amenhotep III. It seems thus that this consisted of services rendered between allied courts (allied by dynastic marriages), and not exchanges following the gift/contra-gift principle.

=== Alliances and International Treaties ===
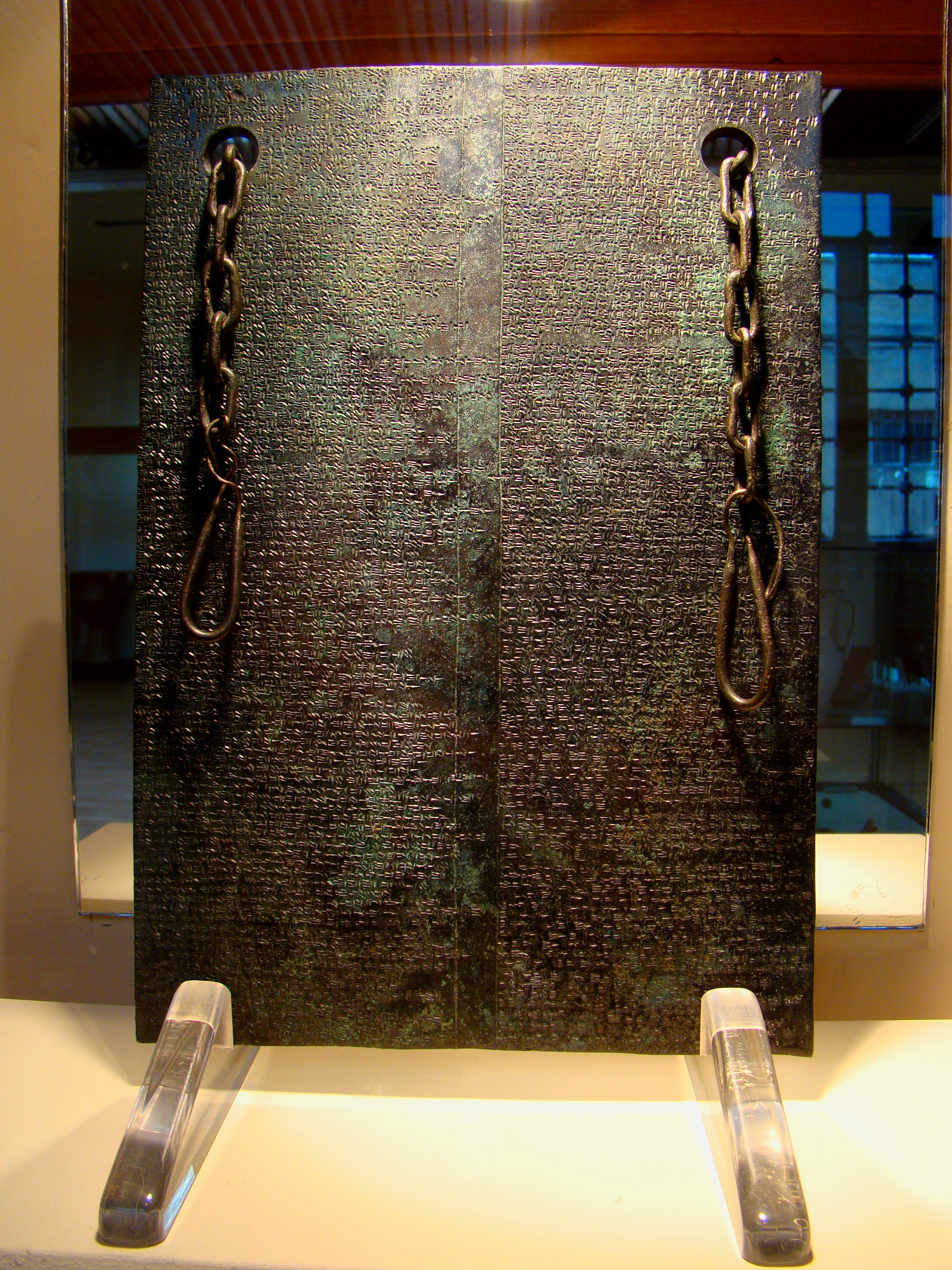
Bronze tablet on which is inscribed the peace treaty between the Hittite king Tudhaliya IV and Kurunta of Tarhuntassa, 13th century, the only example of a treaty inscribed on a metal tablet which has been found. It was discovered at Hattusa.

At particular times, states could conclude diplomatic accords, of which the names varied (for example, in Akkadian niš ili(m), riksu(m), māmītu(m), or adê in the neo-Assyrian era; lingaiš- or išhiul- in Hittite; bêrit in Hebrew). These generally followed periods of war, and were intended to end them. These treaties were not necessarily written down, but written treaties appeared relatively early— the earliest known example dates to the 24th century, and concerns the cities of Ebla and Abarsal, the latter of which involved Naram-Sin of Akkad and an Elamite king. In the Amorrite period, many tablets detailing the protocols of oaths of alliance between kings were unearthed at Mari, Tell Leilan, and Kültepe, or are of unknown provenance (accords between Shadlash and Nerebtum and Eshnunna, Larsa and Uruk). And the texts of treaties date to the following period, found at Alalakh, Ugarit, and above all Hattusa, the Hittite capital, the treaty between Hittite king Hattusili III and Egyptian king Ramses II being additionally known by its Egyptian copy inscribed in hieroglyphs, the only time copies of a treaty have been found at sites of both parties. Concerning the neo-Assyrian period, international treaties were exhumed at Nineveh; another is linked by an Aramaic inscription to Sfire.

"(Clauses of the accord:) [As] in your country there is a cord and picket (within your borders), no Assyrian must suffer a loss (of merchandise). If there is a loss in your country, you must find it and return it to us. If blood is spilled in your country, you must give us the murderers and we will kill them. You must not allow Akkadians to enter, if they come towards your country, you must give them to us and we will kill them. You must not reclaim anything from us. Even from your father, you will pre-levy 12 shekels of tin from each entering caravan. In leaving, even from your father, you will benefit from 1 1/4 shekels of silver per donkey. You will not receive anything more. If there must be a war or if no caravan can enter, we will send you 5 minas of tin from Hahhum.

(Oath ritual) By the god Assur, the God of the Storm, the Earth, and the spirits of our ancestors, he has raised his hand. He straddles his table and his seat. He has filled a cauldron and his cup and has emptied them. The princes has said this: '(unintelligible)'. They have responded thus: 'If we renounce your oath, that our blood may be spilled as this cup!'"

Summary of an accord between the merchants of Assur and an Anatolian sovereign, found at Kültepe (Kanesh), detailing the protection of Assyrian merchants, a commercial monopoly to their benefit, as well the raising of tariffs that they must pay.

"Swears by Shamash of the skies, swears by Addu of the skies, by these gods, Hammurabi, son of Sin-muballit king of Babylon!

From this day forth, for my entire life, I will be at war with Siwepalarhuhpak. I will not allow my servants, as messengers, to travel with his servants and aid them. I will not make peace with Siwepalarhuhpak, without the permission of Zimri-Lim, king of Mari and of the Bedouin country. If I propose peace with Siwepalarhuhpak, I promise to deliberate with Zimri-Lim king of Mari and the Bedouin country to know whether or not to make peace. I swear that it is together that we will make peace with Siwepalarhuhpak!

It is will good sentiments and complete sincerity that I make this oath before my gods, Shahmush and Addu, who is sworn to Zimri-Lim son of Yahdun-Lim king of Mari and the Bedouin country and that I meet him."

Treaty of alliance between the kings Hammurabi of Babylon and Zimri-Lim of Mari against Siwe-Palar-Khuppak of Elam.

"Ramses, Great King, King of Egypt, is in good peace and good amity with [Hattusili], Great King of the Hittites. The sons of Ramses-beloved-of-Amun, King of Egypt, will be in peace [and fraternity with] the sons of Hattusili, Great King, King of the Hittites, forever. And they will remain in the same relations of fraternity [and peace] as us, thus Egypt and the Hittites will remain in peace and fraternity like us forever. Ramses-beloved-of-Amun, Great King, King of Egypt, will not in the future open hostilities against the Hittites to take there what he may, and Hattusili, Great King, King of the Hittites, will not in the future open hostilities against Egypt to take there what he may."

Extract from the treaty of amity between Ramses II, of Egypt, and Hattusili III, of the Hittites, version of Ramses II found at Hattusa

"Treaty of Assarhaddon, king of Assyria, son of Sennacherib, king of Assyria, with Baal, king of Tyre, [... his sons, his other sons, his grandsons, with all Tyrians, young and old]

(Clauses: ) If a ship of Baal or the people of Tyre shipwrecks in the country of Palestine, or in Assyria, that which is in the ship belongs to Assarhaddon, king of Assyria. No harm must come to the people on the ship, they will be returned to their country. These are the ports and routes which Assarhaddon, king of Assyria, confides in Baal, his servant: from Acre, Dor, all the country of the Philistines, and all the Assyrian towns close to the sea, and Byblos, the country of Lebanon, and all the towns in the mountains. All these towns belong to Assarhaddon, king of Assyria. Baal [may enter these] towns. Tyre, conforming to that which Assarhaddon, king of Assyria, has permitted, [will remain] in their ships, and if they enter the towns of [...], their towns, their villages, their ports which [...] to pay, and their environs, as in the past [...]

(Curses: ) That the great gods of sky and earth, the gods of Assyria, the gods of Akkad and the gods of Eber-nari damn you with an everlasting curse. That Baal Shamain, Baal Malage, and Baal Saphon raise a wind against your ships, to free their moorings and fell their masts; that a powerful wave strikes them in the sea and a violent tide rises against you. That Melqart and Eshmun bring your country to destruction and your people to deportation, that they take you from your country, lacking food for your mouth, clothes for your body, oil to anoint you. That Astarte breaks your arc in heavy combat, that she submits you to your enemy, that your enemy shares in your goods."

Treaty between Assarhaddon of Assyria and Baal of Tyre

.

A written version was not necessarily recorded at the conclusion of a diplomatic accord. What mattered was the oath taken by witness of the gods, engaging each of the parties. "Treaties" from the Amorrite period are actually protocols for these oaths; they were often reinforced by rituals: a sacrifice following a banquet if both parties could be present for the conclusion of the accord, or a ritual called "throat touching" (lipit napištim) if it was impossible to meet in person. No ritual of this type is known from other periods. The Hittites paid more attention to the tablets on which treaties were recorded; the clauses of certain treaties stipulated that many copies were to be produced, and stored in specified locations, chiefly the temples of the gods bearing witness to the accord. They also recorded treaties on metal tablets, a single example of which has been found in Hattusa. Treaties in general seem to have concerned only the parties themselves, and not their descendants, who would have to renew the accord upon ascending to the throne. The Hittites, though, seem to have considered treaties to engage the parties' descendants as well.

The texts of treaties generally consisted of: presentation of the parties concerned, the clauses of the accord, the list of divinities guaranteeing the accord, and eventually the curses which would afflict those who broke the contract. The Hittites also included a section detailing the historical situation which led to the treaty's existence. Clauses usually concerned the conditions of peace between parties (the circulation of people between kingdoms, the repatriation of prisoners, and eventually the expulsion of political refugees), or even an alliance (following the formula "to be friends with the friends and enemies with the enemies" of the other). The hierarchy of kings was respected in the clauses: they were symmetrical if they concerned two rulers of equal rank, but unequal if they concerned a suzerain and his vassal. The treaties of vassalhood (above all attested in the Hittite and Assyrian spheres) regulated the conditions of the submission of one kingdom to another: the vassal could not maintain an independent foreign policy, had to pay a tribute, lend military aid to the suzerain when needed, and sometimes to allow the suzerain's garrisons on their soil. In the case of the treaties passed by the merchant city of Assur in the 19th century, clauses relating to economic activities are found (taxation, security of merchants).

=== Matrimonial Alliances ===
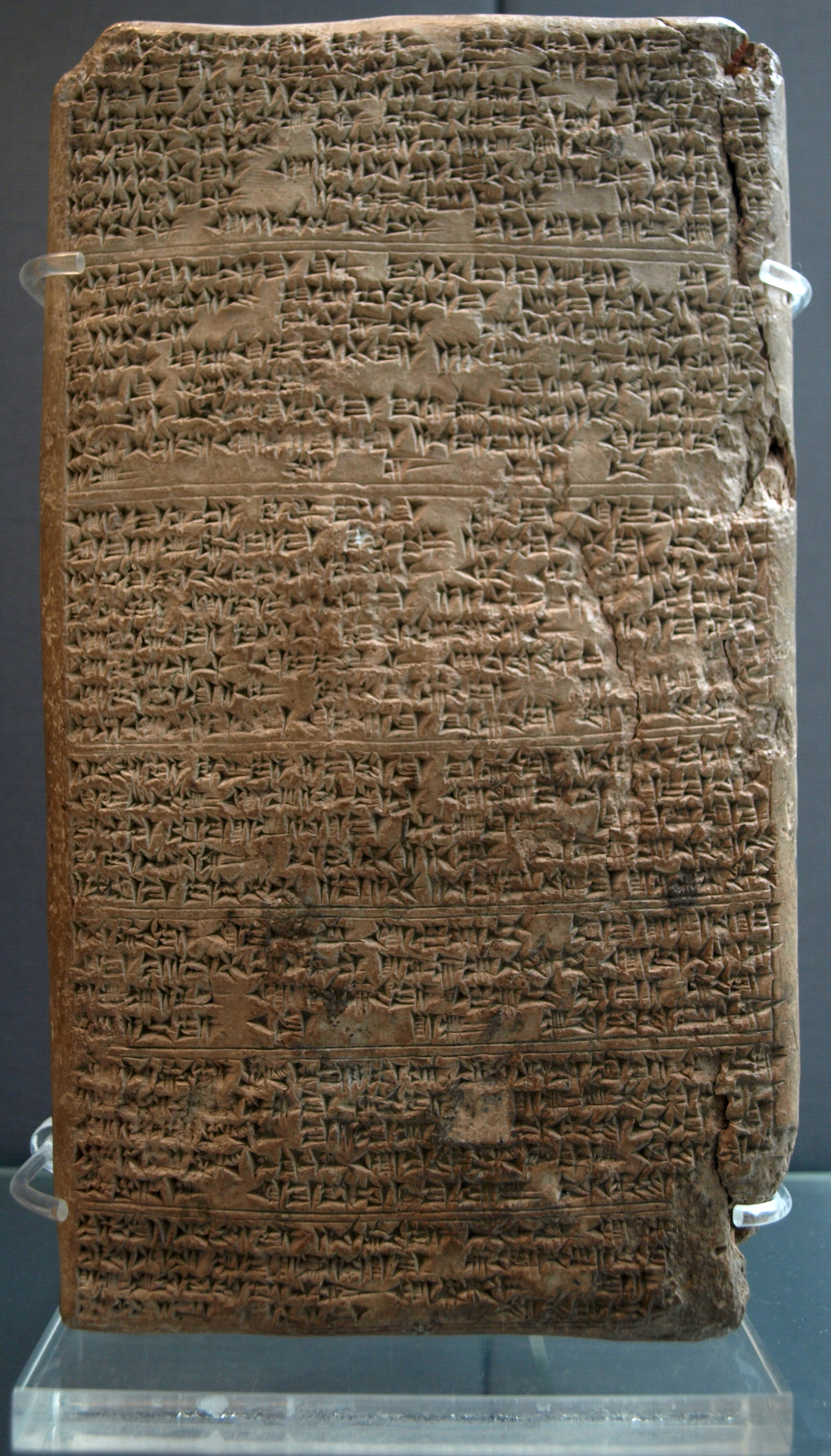
Amarna Letter on the negotiations for the marriage of Amenhotep III and Tadu-hepa, the daughter of the Mitanni king Tushratta.

Dynastic marriages were a very common diplomatic practice in the history of the ancient Near East, attested from the archives of Ebla in the archaic period, but above all documented in the 2nd millennium. It was a means of creating or deepening links between two royal families. Sovereigns were polygamous, so they could contract marriages with many daughters or sisters of other kings. It was always the woman who left her court to join that of her fiancé. Marriages could be between kingdoms of the same rank, or between those of different ranks, when a suzerain promised a woman to a vassal, or even a vassal promised a woman to a suzerain. They would thus join the harem of their new spouse. Great kings generally ensured that their daughters would play main roles at the courts they went to, and often imposed that they would be the principal wife so that they could eventually play a political role. The Hebrew Bible presents the case of Jezabel, daughter of the king of Tyre, as an examples of this; she married King Ahab of Judea and exercised great influence over him. But such a success was not systematic, and a study of the destinies of the daughters of king Zimri-Lim of Mari, who were married to daughters of other Syrian Amorrite kings, shows that some fared better than others. In principle, every sovereign must play the game of matrimonial exchanges, but the Egyptian kings of the recent Bronze Age make an exception. They refused to marry their daughters to foreign kings, even their equals, but still consented to marry foreign princesses themselves; they did not respect the rules of parity in this case.

The process of arranging dynastic marriages is known thanks to many well-documented records, found at Mari, Tell el-Amarna, and Hattusa (in the case of marriages between kingdoms of equal rank. First, the marriage had to be negotiated, in particular the choice of spouse. The initiative was generally taken by the future father-in-law, but sometimes by the future husband. Negotiations were conducted by correspondence, and through the most trusted messenger/ambassadors available. In the case of the marriage between Ramses II and the daughter of Hattusili III, the Hittite queen Puduhepa negotiated directly with the Egyptian queen. But generally, it was the business of men. Envoys had to negotiate the dowry, but also to see the bride and assure the groom's family that she was beautiful, which was the main quality sought after in her. The dowry (nidittum in paleo-Babylonian, given by the bride's family to the groom's) was the object of negotiations which could be fierce, and called equally for a counter-dowry (terhatum in paleo-Babylonian, given by the groom's family to the bride's). Lists of dowries and counter-dowries have been exhumed at Mari and Tell el-Amarna. Once the arrangements had been made, the princess left her home court for good in order to integrate into her husband's. She made the journey with her entourage, representatives of her home court, and those of her fiancé's court. The marital ceremony was generally held after she arrived. She could then keep in contact with her family through letters, or through envoys sent by them. Her family would have anxiously awaited news that she bore children (preferably male) for her husband.

== See also ==
- Ebla
- Mari, Syria
- Amarna letters

== General Bibliography ==
- Lafont, Bertrand (2001). "Diplomatie". In Joannès, Francis (ed.). Dictionnaire de la civilisation mésopotamienne (in French). Paris: Robert Laffont. pp. 235–239.
- Lafont, Bertrand (2001). "International Relations in the Ancient Near East: The Birth of a Complete Diplomatic System". Diplomacy & Statecraft. 12: 39–60. doi:10.1080/09592290108406187.
- Liverani, Mario (2001). International Relations in the Ancient Near East, 1600-1100 B.C. Houndmills et New York: Palgrave.
- Podany, Amanda H. (2010). Brotherhood of Kings: How International Relations Shaped the Ancient Near East. Oxford et New York: Oxford University Press.
- Charpin, Dominique (2019). "Tu es de mon sang !" Les alliances dans le Proche-Orient ancien (in French). Paris: Les Belles Lettres - Collège de France.
