= Ibbi-Sipish =

Vizier of Ebla
- Tenure: c. 2322 – c. 2305 BC
- Predecessor: Ibrium
- King: Isar-Damu
- Died: c. 2300 BC
- Issue: Dubuhu-Ada
- Father: Ibrium

Ibbi-Sipish or Ibbi-Zikir (died c. 2300 BC) was the vizier of Ebla for king Ishar-Damu for 17 years. He was the son of his predecessor, Ibrium, who had been Ishar-Damu's vizier for 15 years.

Ibbi-Sipish visited cities abroad, such as Kish. He also concluded a treaty with Armi. It is further known from one tablet that Ibbi-Sipish vanquished king Hida'ar of Mari, Ebla's main rival in the region, in the 32nd year of Ishar-Damu's reign. However, Ebla's destruction was to come only three years later, presumably at the hands of the Akkadian ruler Sargon the Great.

Until 1985, the consensus of scholars had been that Ibbi-Sipish, Ibrium, and Ibrium's predecessor Ar-ennum, had all been reigning monarchs in Ebla; consequently, it was assumed that they had ruled after Ishar-Damu, and before the destruction of Ebla. This discarded reconstruction continues to be found still in many less informed sources. In 1985, Ebla researchers first revealed that these three figures did not appear to be reigning kings, and further cuneiform studies have since allowed for a more precise portrayal of the actual situation in Ebla at the time.
