= Artner =

Artner is a surname. Notable people with the surname include:

- Peter Artner (born 1966), Austrian footballer
- Tamás Artner (born 1970), Hungarian football manager
- Therese von Artner (1772–1829), German-language author
