= Irkab-Damu =

King of Ebla
- Reign: c. 2351 - c. 2340 BC
- Predecessor: Igrish-Halam
- Successor: Isar-Damu
- Spouse: Dusigu
- Issue: Isar-Damu; Iti-Mut; Tarib-Damu; Tiste-Damu; Tinib-Dulum
- Father: Igrish-Halam
- Mother: Kesdut

Irkab-Damu (fl. c. 2340 BC) was king (Malikum) of the first Eblaite kingdom, whose era saw Ebla's turning into the dominant power in the Levant.

During his reign, the vizier started to acquire an important role in running the affair of the state and the military. Irkab-Damu's reign is also noted for the wide diplomatic relations between Ebla and the surrounding kingdoms.

== Reign ==
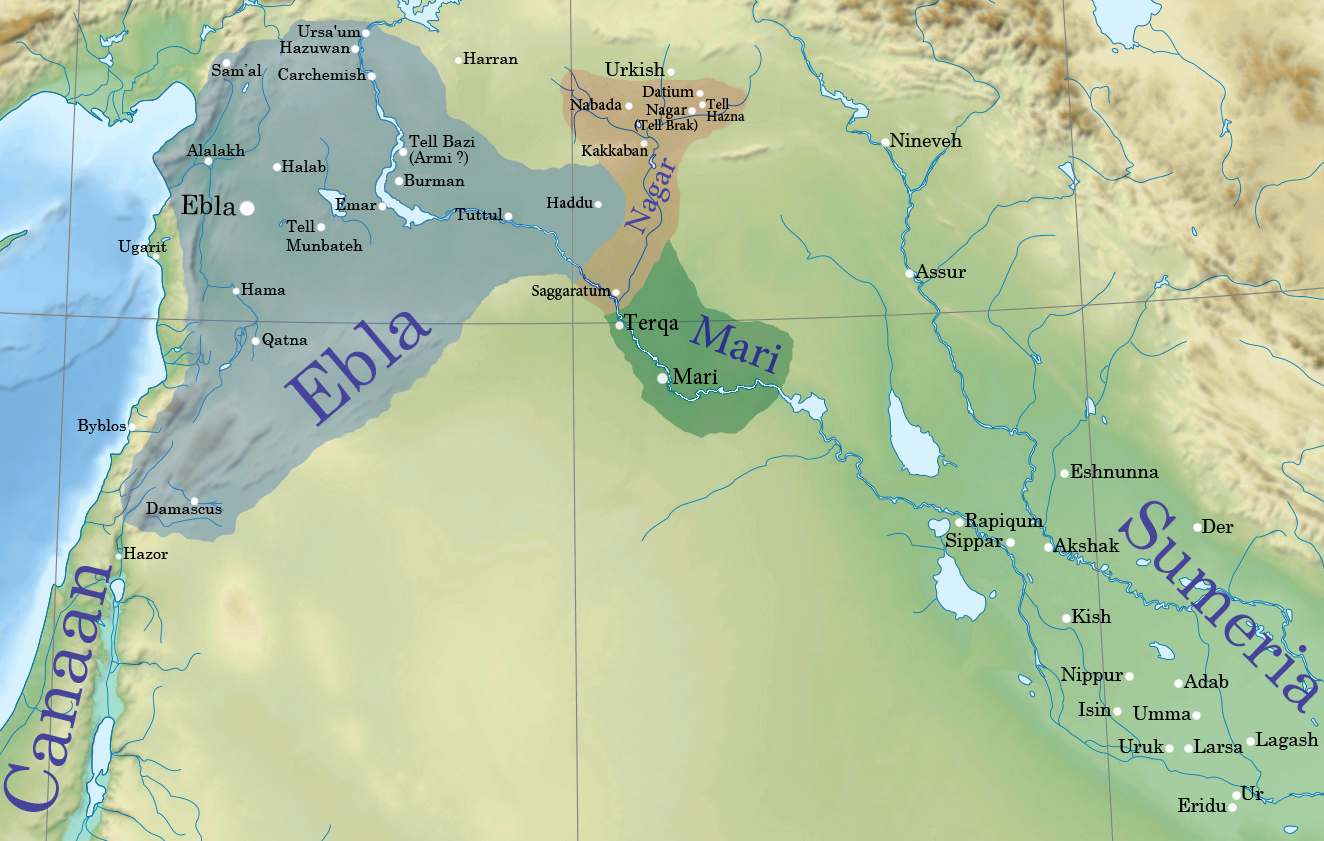
Ebla at the end of Irkab-Damu's reign

Irkab-Damu succeeded king Igrish-Halam, whose reign was characterized by an Eblaite weakness, and tribute paying to the kingdom of Mari with whom Ebla fought a long war. Irkab-Damu started his reign by concluding a peace and trading treaty with Abarsal (probably located along the Euphrates river east of Ebla), one of the first recorded treaties in history. Ebla paid tribute to Mari during Irkab-Damu's first years on the throne. A letter from king Enna-Dagan of Mari was discovered at Ebla, and was used by the Mariote monarch as a tool to assert Mari's authority, as it contained a historic telling of the victories won by Enna-Dagans's predecessors over Ebla.

=== Expansion ===
Irkab-Damu launched a successful counteroffensive against Mari, and ended the tribute. He expanded the borders of Ebla to its greatest extent, and controlled an area roughly half the size of modern Syria, half of which was under the direct control of the king and administered by governors, while the rest consisted of vassal kingdoms paying tribute and supplying military assistance to Ebla. A tablet from Ebla mention an Eblaite victory over Nagar, most probably during Irakb-Damu's reign. The same tablet mention the concluding of a treaty with Enna-Dagan. Irkab-Damu appointed Arrukum as the first vizier of Ebla, who kept his office for five years, and had his son Ruzi-Malik marrying princess Iti-Mut, the daughter of the king.

Diplomacy was an important part of Irkab-Damu's policy, a clay tablet found in the archives at Ebla, bears a copy of a diplomatic message sent from Ebla to king Zizi of Hamazi, along with a large quantity of wood, hailing him as a brother, and requesting him to send mercenaries in exchange. Gifts from Ancient Egypt were discovered in the royal palace, indicating the far reaching relations of Ebla, which is described by Karl Moore as the history first world power.

== Succession and family ==
Irkab-Damu was the son of Igrish-Halam and his queen Kesdut. He ruled for eleven years, and married Dusigu in his fifth year on the throne. Irkab-Damu's last two years saw the rise of vizier Ibrium, who campaigned against Abarsal during Arrukum's term, and became Ebla's strongest official during the reign of Irkab-Damu's son and successor Isar-Damu.

King Irkab-Damu of Ebla
Regnal titles
Preceded by Igrish-Halam	King of Ebla c. 2351 - c. 2340 BC	Succeeded by Isar-Damu

== See also ==
- Ebla tablets
- Cities of the ancient Near East
- Eblaite-Mariote war
