= Therese von Artner =

Hungarian German-language poet (b. 1772, d. 1829)

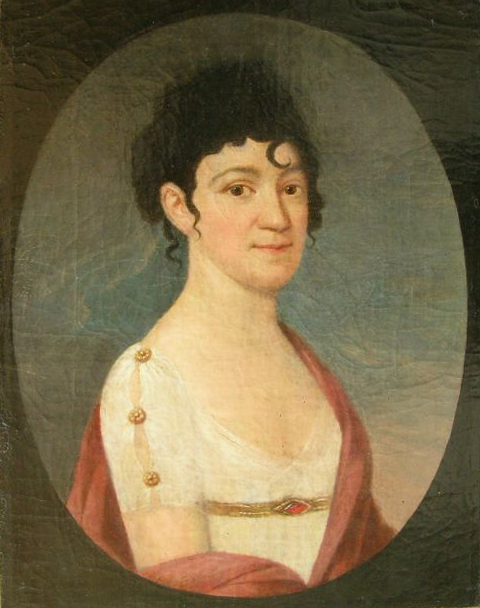
- Born: 1772; Schintau, Hungary
- Died: 1829 (aged 56–57); Agram (Croatia), Croatia
- Other name: Theone
- Occupations: Lyrical poems, pastel portrait artist

Therese von Artner (1772 – 1829) was a German-language author who published lyric poems under the pseudonym Theone.

== Biography ==
Maria Therese von Artner was born in Schintau, Hungary, in 1772. Her father was an officer in the Austrian military. She began writing poetry at a young age, publishing poems under the pseudonym Theone. Artner may have chosen her pseudonym based on the poem Teone by Friedrich Gottlieb Klopstock, who she cited as an early influence.

During her lifetime, Artner's most successful works were her poems, published in three collections: Feldblumen auf Ungarns Fluren gesammelt von Minna und Theone (1800), Neuere Gedichte von Theone (1806), and Gedichte (1818).

From 1814 to 1829, Artner would spend time each summer with friends Karoline Pichler, Marianne von Neumann Meissenthal, and Marie Gräfin von Zay to read and critique each other's writing. Artner wrote two poems about Pichler, "The Rescue" and "To Caroline Pichler," while Pichler responded with the poem "To My Friend Theone."

In 1817, Artner wrote the drama Die That (The Deed), a tragedy in five acts which imagined the events taking place before the plot of Adolf Müllner's play Die Schuld (The Guilt). The play is written in trochaic tetrameter. In 1824, she wrote Stille Größe (Quiet Greatness).

In addition to her written work, Artner has also been cited as an accomplished pastel portrait artist.

Artner died in Agram, Croatia, in 1829.
