= Tell Chuera =

- Harbe
- Location within Syria
- 36°38′44.88″N 39°29′53.88″E
- Type: settlement
- Location: Raqqa Governorate, Syria
- Region: Northern Mesopotamia

Site notes
- Excavation dates: 1958–1960s 1973–1977 1982–2011
- Archaeologists: A. Moortgat, U. Moortgat-Correns, W. Orthmann, J.-W. Meyer

Tell Chuera (also Tell Ḫuera and Tall Ḥuwaira and Tall Chuera and Tell Khuēra) is an ancient Near Eastern tell site in Raqqa Governorate, northern Syria about 6 kilometers south of the Syria/Turkey border. It lies between the Balikh and Khabur rivers. Originally occupied during the 5th millennium BC, Tell Chuera became a major site in the 3rd millennium during the Early Dynastic period and was then abandoned until a small Mitanni and Middle Assyrian settlement sprung up in the mid-2nd millennium BC.

== History ==
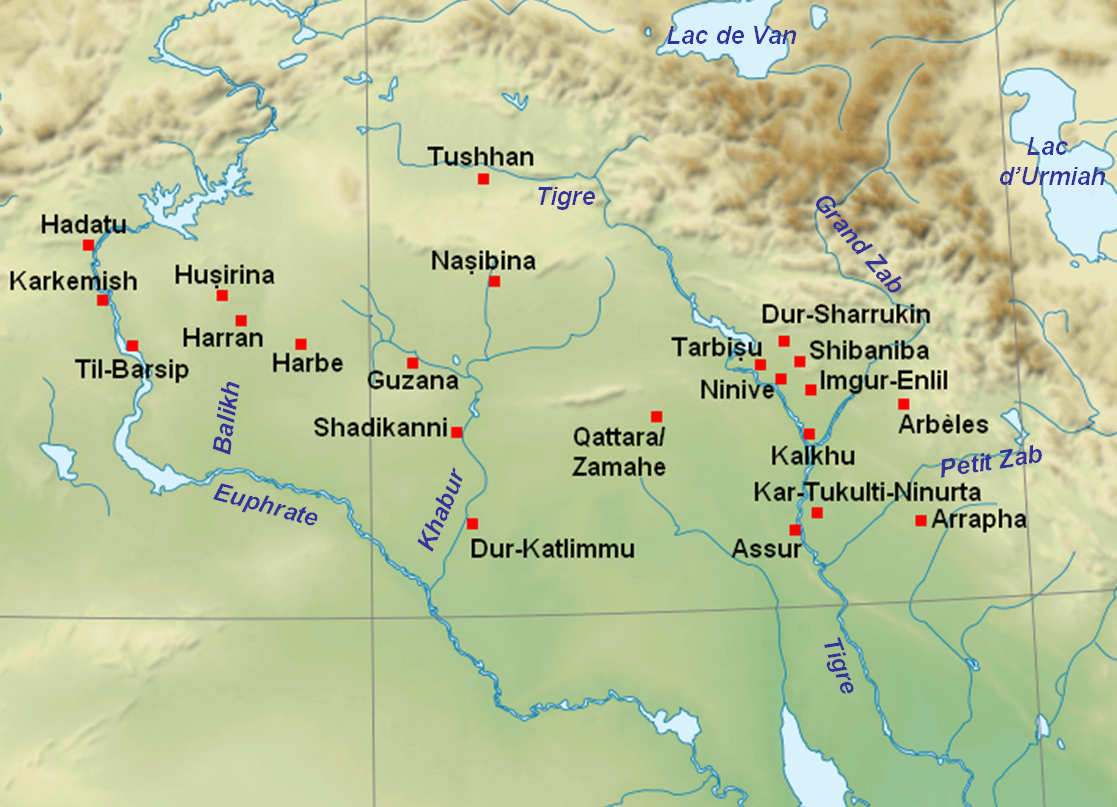
Map of area in Middle Assyrian times

A small occupation in the 5th millennium BC Halaf period is known only from the presence of surface shards.

=== Early Bronze ===
The main upper town settlement began late in the 4th millenium BC (Tell Chuera IA c. 3100 BC) and covered around 50 hectares. That level was fortified with a wall. In Tell Chuera IB, c. 2700 BC (Early Bronze Age II) a second fortication was added much increasing the settlement area with the inner wall slowly then being absorbed into construction. The final 3rd millennium BC level (Tell Chuera ID c. 2450) was a planned settlement. The settlement had a central axis which ran through the city with major public buildings, a sacred district in the south-east section of the town, a central square with adjoining temple, and a palace in the north-western section. It reached its peak around 2350 BC and was then abandoned for reasons as yet unknown.

In the Early Bronze IVB, the site was active during the Ur III period (c. 2112–2004 BC).

=== Late Bronze ===
A small settlement was built on the location by the Mittani during the middle 2nd millennium BC followed by the Assyrians. Equid bones from that period have been identified as horses. During Middle Assyrian times it was known as Harbe. It has been proposed that in earlier times its name was Abarsal.

== Archaeology ==
The site of Tell Chuera is roughly one kilometer in diameter and 18 meters high. It is of a type referred to as a Kranzhügel or "cup-and-saucer" tell in archaeology, similar to Tell Beydar and Mari. The site was first described by Max von Oppenheim in 1913. Excavations were begun in 1958 by a team from the Free University of Berlin led by Anton Moortgat. These efforts continued until the late 1960s. Mittani period structures (Knicksachstempel and Mittani-Bau) were uncovered. With a new co-leader, Ursula Moortgat-Correns, digs occurred in 1973, 1974 and 1976. At the top of the mound three buildings of undressed stone were found (Steinbau I, II, and III) and in the center a mudbrick temple building (Kleiner Antentempe - Smaller Antentemple) all raised on a platform. In Steinbau I, which had 6 building phases, decorated bronze vessels and bent copper pins with ball heads and flattened perforated shanks (similar to those in the royal cemetery at Ur) from the Early Dynastic period were found. Some clay sealings, sealed with typical ED cylinder seals, were also recovered. The temple had a processional way "lined with rough, megalithic stone stelai" between 2 and 3 meters in height. In an adjacent area were found a number of alabaster statue fragments of votive statues representing males with long wigs, square-cut beards and garments with fleecy fringes, the tallest being 35 centimeters.

After a 5 year hiatus caused by the death of Anton Moortgat in 1977 work resumed in 1982 and continued until 2011. Two teams worked at the site, one under the direction of Winfried Orthmann of the University of Halle and the other under Ursula Moortgat-Correns, until 1998. Excavation then was taken up by a team from the Goethe University Frankfurt, under the direction of Professor Jan-Waalke Meyer from 1998 to 2005.

A number of Middle Assyrian period cuneiform tablets and fragments dated to the reign of Tukulti-Ninurta I (c. 1244-1208), some with envelopes, were found.

== See also ==
- Cities of the ancient Near East
- Kazane Höyük
- Tell Beydar
- Tell Brak
- Tell Khoshi
