= Kazane Höyük =

Archaeological site in Turkey

- Location within Turkey
- 37°7′11″N 38°50′46″E
- Type: settlement
- Location: Şanlıurfa Province, Turkey

Site notes
- Excavation dates: 1992, 1994-2004
- Archaeologists: Patricia Wattenmaker, Adnan Mısır, Susan Pollock, Reinhard Bernbeck
- Condition: Ruined
- Owner: Public
- Public access: Yes

Kazane Höyük is located 600 meters south of the Kazane Village (now named Konuklu) on the Harran Plain of Şanlıurfa Province, southeastern Turkey. It lies 3 kilometers south of modern Sanlıurfa. It has been suggested as the location of the ancient city of Uršu and also Abarsal.

== Archaeology ==
Urfa museum Vase from Kazane Höyük - Chalcolithic

The site covers an area of about 100 hectares with a 20 meter high 12 hectare Upper Town and a Lower Town. A large channel was cut into the base of the mound as part of the Urfa irrigation project. It was excavated, beginning with a surface survey in 1992 including a systematic surface collection over the site, by a University of Virginia team led by Patricia Wattenmaker & Adnan Mısır because it was under threat of destruction by the Southeastern Anatolia Project. Several soundings were made in the Lower Town finding three Middle Bronze building levels about a Early Bronze IIIa level at 2 meters. A monumental building complex was found just beneath the surface on the Upper Town area. A number of clay sealings were found in the Early Bronze levels. While the focus was on the Early Bronze Age, Halaf remains were also found including a child burial in the Lower Town southeast section. On the eastern Lower Town terrace a monumental building was uncovered with 5 meter wide stone foundation walls.

From 1996 until 1998 excavations resumed under the direction of Susan Pollock and Reinhard Bernbeck under the overall lead of Patricia Wattenmaker, focused on the Chalcolithic, Halaf period and Middle Brinze areas of the site in the Lower Town. Several tholos structures were found. A cache of 57 cattle astragal were found on the Halaf level, on the floor of Tholos 2. It has been proposed that they were used for gaming or divination. Sixth millennium BC stamp seals and sealings wer also found as well as a number of chipped stone jetons. On the eastern Lower Town terrace the Early Bronze III monumental building was further explored, extending the 1 meter high foundation of the enclosure wall and finding a 13 meter wide gate with projecting towers. Work continued until 2004 foucusing on Lower Town areas being disturbed by agricultural irrigation ditches. A Middle Bronze tomb with bronze pins, a carnelian bead, and an obsidian knife was uncovered.

Villagers gave three cuneiform tablets, two of them fragmentary and damaged, to the excavators indicating they had been found at the site. Both of the latter (said to have been found in the southwest area of the site where surface finds of 2nd millennium BC pottery had been made) were from the Old Babylonian period and one read "Sixteen shekels of silver, which (was given) for the trip of Ubburi, when to the city of Mi-[...] he went. In accordance with the instructions Išme-Dagan ...". This Išme-Dagan is thought to be the ruler of the Kingdom of Upper Mesopotamia and son of Šamši-Adad I. The other, said to have been found in the Lower Town area, is compete, ruled into squares, and completely covered on the obverse with cuneiform wedges which form no intelligible symbols.

== History ==
The site was occupied during the Pottery Neolithic (c. 6000 BC) and Halaf period (c. 5000 BC). The settlement diminished in size during the Late Chalcolithic/Uruk Period (4th millennium BC) and Early Bronze Age I and was restricted to the Upper Mound. The settlement grew in the Early Bronze II-IV period and continued, on a more modest scale, through the Early Middle Bronze period (2100–1750 BC) before being abandoned. In the late 3rd Millennium BC, Early Bronze III period, the city reached its peak covered an area of about 100 hectares including both the Upper Town and Lower Town. It and Haran were the only major cities on the Harran plain at that time. At this point a large fortification wall was built around the Lower Town.

== See also ==
- Cities of the ancient Near East
- List of Mesopotamian deities
- List of Mesopotamian dynasties
