= Wally Miller =

Australian rules footballer, born 1917

Personal information
- Full name: Walter Hensen Miller
- Born: 21 October 1917; Footscray, Victoria
- Died: 26 May 1992 (aged 74); Maroochydore, Queensland
- Original team: Preston
- Height: 165 cm (5 ft 5 in)
- Weight: 66 kg (146 lb)

Playing career^{1}
Years	Club	Games (Goals)
1939–1940	Preston (VFA)	24 (42)
1943–1945	Fitzroy	36 (33)
- ^{1} Playing statistics correct to the end of 1945.

Walter Hensen Miller (21 October 1917 – 26 May 1992) was an Australian rules footballer who played with the Fitzroy Football Club in the Victorian Football League (VFL).
