= Nachhatar Chhatta =

Nachhatar Singh Chhatta (18 June 1959 – 6 May 1992), commonly known by his stage name Nachhatar Chhatta (ਨਛੱਤਰ ਛੱਤਾ), was a popular Punjabi singer.

His music was heavily influenced by Punjabi rural life, which he was surrounded by while growing up. He was famous for his well-known sad hits, but the song, ''Rut Peyar Di'' was one of his most notable hits. His best-known hits include, ''Fikka Rang Ajj Di Dupehr Da'' - '' Tenu Bhuleya Ni Janda'' - 'Tu Pardes'

== Early life and career ==
Nachhatar Chhatta was born on June 18, 1959, in Adampura, a village in the Bathinda district of Punjab, India. He was born into a poor Scheduled caste family. The elder child of Sudagar Singh (ਸੁਦਾਗਰ ਸਿੰਘ) who was a laborer and Amar Kaur (ਅਮਰ ਕੌਰ), he used to sing when he grazed cattle in his childhood. Because of poverty, he did not have a proper education. He acted as Pooran Bhagat in plays, like another Punjabi music legend Amar Singh Chamkila, however he would listen to Muhammad Sadiq more than others in his childhood.

== Rise to Fame ==
In the Burj Rajgarh Tournament, he sang his first song ''Chaar Din Zindgi de Rakhi Saamb Ke'' (‘ਚਾਰ ਦਿਨ ਜ਼ਿੰਦਗੀ ਦੇ ਰੱਖੀਂ ਸਾਂਭ ਕੇ’) on stage. After that, he became a popular local songwriter and singer. After listening to that song, Master Gurbaksh Singh Albela became Chhatta's key to success in the Punjabi music industry.

Along with Lok Sangeet Mandli Bhadaur, he recorded his first two songs in a collaborated album of thirteen songs.

Including Master Gurbaksh Singh Albela, he sang many cover songs, such as "Keval Bhadaur", "Geeta Deyalpuria", and "Balwant Khana" in his career.

In 1987, he achieved a major hit with his album Rut Peyar Di (‘ਰੁੱਤ ਪਿਆਰ ਦੀ) with the label of Payal Company. He became very popular with the youth of 1980s Punjab. His songs were usually played everywhere in Punjab in that era, and he was known as the star of Punjabi music.

== Legacy ==
Once Punjabi Legend King of Kaliyaan, Kuldeep Manak gives his gold chain to Nachhatar Chhatta in Prof. Mohan Singh Mela because of he Sung at higher Scale than Legend Kuldeep Manak Ji. Badshah (King) of Kaliyaan said that one more Manak is born today in Bathinda.

== Death ==
He died from alcohol intoxication on May 6, 1992.
