= Igrish-Halam =

King of Ebla
- Reign: c. 2360 BC
- Predecessor: Possibly Adub-Damu
- Successor: Irkab-Damu
- Spouse: Kesdut
- Issue: Irkab-Damu

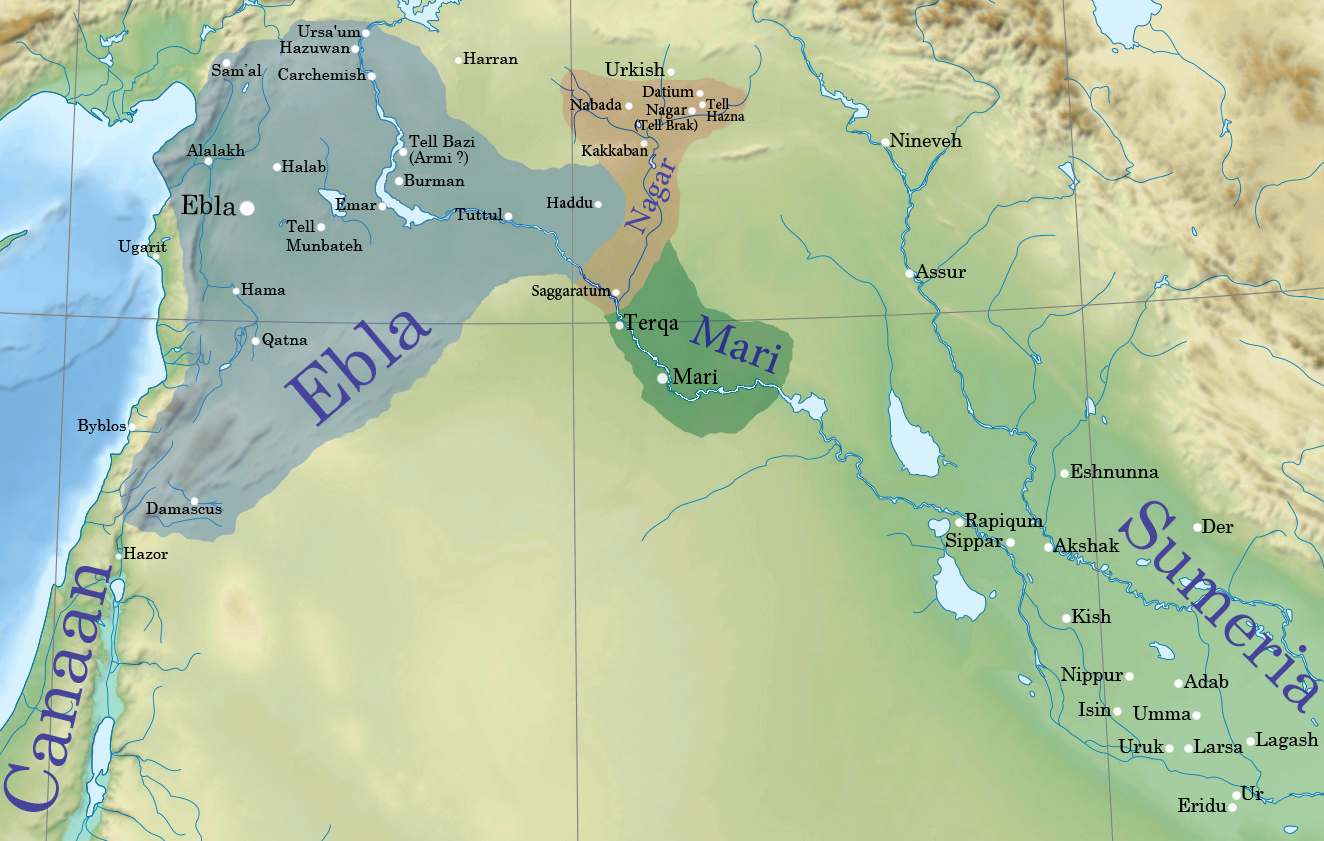
First Eblaite Empire

Igrish-Halam or Igriš-Halab (fl. c. 2360 BC) was a king of the ancient city state of Ebla. His name means "(The god of) Halab has driven away (the opponent)", hence, the name might be a commemoration of an Eblaite victory that led to the incorporation of lands beyond the city of Halab.

== Reign ==
He ruled for 12 years and was succeeded by his son Irkab-Damu who was a more vigorous ruler.

=== Conflict with Mari ===
His reign was characterized by an Eblaite weakness, and tribute paying to the kingdom of Mari, with whom Ebla fought a long war. His battle with Iblul-Il of Mari at Sahiri was instrumental in this tribute payment.
