= Joe Dell =

Australian rules footballer, born 1916

Personal information
- Full name: Joe Dell
- Born: 22 February 1916
- Died: 29 May 1992 (aged 76)
- Original team: Kilcunda
- Height: 180 cm (5 ft 11 in)
- Weight: 73 kg (161 lb)

Playing career^{1}
Years	Club	Games (Goals)
1937	St Kilda	2 (2)
- ^{1} Playing statistics correct to the end of 1937.

Joe Dell (22 February 1916 – 29 May 1992) was an Australian rules footballer who played with St Kilda in the Victorian Football League (VFL).
