= Les Pabst =

Australian rules footballer, born 1917

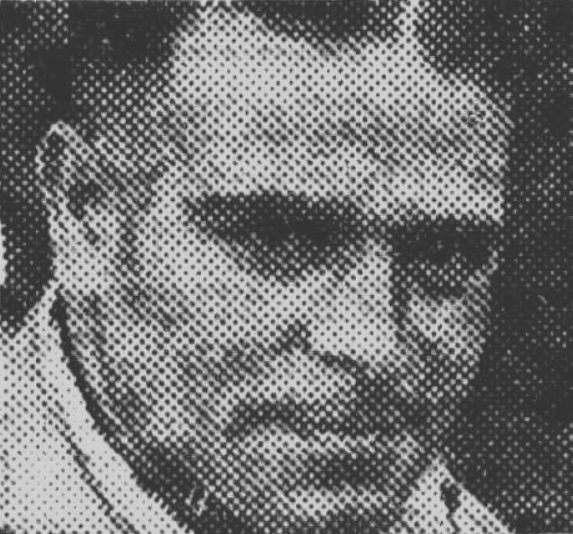

Personal information
- Full name: John Leslie Pabst
- Born: 28 March 1917; Footscray, Victoria
- Died: 12 May 1992 (aged 75)
- Original team: Malvern Amateurs
- Height: 173 cm (5 ft 8 in)
- Weight: 73 kg (161 lb)
- Position: Wing

Playing career^{1}
Years	Club	Games (Goals)
1939–41, 1944–48	Hawthorn	94 (12)
- ^{1} Playing statistics correct to the end of 1948.

John Leslie Pabst (28 March 1917 – 12 May 1992) was an Australian rules footballer who played with Hawthorn in the Victorian Football League (VFL). Between his two stints in the VFL, he served in the Australian Army during World War II.

== Honours and achievements ==
Individual

- Hawthorn life member
