= Ken Hogan (footballer) =

Australian rules footballer

Personal information
- Full name: Ken R. Hogan
- Born: 24 July 1951
- Died: 24 May 1992 (aged 40)
- Original team: Ivanhoe Grammar
- Height: 175 cm (5 ft 9 in)
- Weight: 73 kg (161 lb)
- Position: Rover

Playing career^{1}
Years	Club	Games (Goals)
1971–72	Essendon	18 (9)
- ^{1} Playing statistics correct to the end of 1972.

Ken Hogan (24 July 1951 – 24 May 1992) was an Australian rules footballer who played with Essendon in the Victorian Football League (VFL). Hogan later played for Sandy Bay in Tasmania, Brunswick in the Victorian Football Association (VFA), and coached Old Ivanhoe Grammarians in the Victorian Amateur Football Association (VAFA).
