= Winfried Orthmann =

German archaeologist (1935–2024)

- Born: 16 August 1935; Berlin, Germany
- Died: 1 February 2024 (aged 88); Volklingen, Saarland, Germany
- Education: Free University of Berlin (D)

Winfried Orthmann (16 August 1935 – 1 February 2024) was a German archaeologist who specialised in the Near East regions.

== Life and career ==
Winfried Orthmann was born in Berlin on 16 August 1935. He studied the ancient history of the Middle East, classical archaeology and Assyriology from 1954 to 1961 at universities in Munich, Berlin, and Ankara. He received his doctoral degree in 1961 at the Free University of Berlin (thesis title: Keramik der Frühen Bronzezeit aus Inneranatolien). After his studies, he was an instructor at the German Archaeological Institute in Istanbul. From 1966 to 1969, he received a scholarship from the German Research Foundation (DFG) to support his habilitation, which took place in 1969 at Saarland University with his publication of Untersuchungen zur späthethitischen Kunst (Investigations of Late Hittite Art). In 1971, he was appointed a scientific advisor and professor at Saarland University, where he remained from 1971 to 1994 as a professor for Near Eastern archaeology. From 1994 to 2000, Orthmann was a professor and dean for art, classical and ancient studies at Martin Luther University of Halle-Wittenberg. He became a professor emeritus at the end of the summer semester in 2000 and remained professionally active until his death. His research focus includes Hittite Archaeology, Syrian archaeology from the third to first millennium BCE and the archaeology of the southern Caucasus region in the early and middle Bronze Age.

Orthmann died in Völklingen on 1 February 2024, at the age of 88.

== Work and projects ==
Travels in near eastern countries and excavation campaigns in Ilica (Turkey) and in Mumbaqat (Syria) since 1973-1974 supported his work as a specialist in archaeology, particularly in the area of Hittite culture.

After the death of Anton Moortgat in 1977, who was a professor of near eastern archaeology at the Free University of Berlin, Orthmann continued the excavations of the ancient settlement at Tell Chuera (in northeast Syria) from 1982 to 1983 together with Ursula Moortgat-Correns of Berlin. As of 1986, he assumed sole responsibility for the excavations. The project was relocated to the Martin Luther University of Halle-Wittenberg in 1994. During the 1996 campaign, his team excavated parts of a large temple complex in the southeastern part of the city and parts of a palace in the west of the city in strata dated to the third millennium BCE. A larger building complex from the middle Assyrian period (13th century BCE) was also excavated. Until 1997 Orthmann was also responsible for work in the Alazani valley in eastern Georgia on behalf of the German Research Foundation (DFG) with the objective of completely excavating a large grave mound (kurgan) originating in the last third of the third millennium BCE near the Alazani River. Excavations were also performed under his direction by an expedition from Saarland University at Halawa (Syria) in the Euphrates Valley from 1975 to 1986.

Orthmann was a full member of the German Archaeological Institute (DAI).

== Publications ==
- Die Keramik der Frühen Bronzezeit aus Inneranatolien. Berlin 1963.
- Der Alte Orient. Berlin 1975 (Propyläen-Kunstgeschichte 14).
- Untersuchungen zur späthethitischen Kunst. Bonn 1971.
- with other contributors: Halawa 1977–1979. Bonn 1981
- with I. Kampschulte: Gräber des 3. Jahrtausends im syrischen Euphrattal I. Ausgrabungen bei Tawi 1975 und 1978. Bonn 1984.
- Halawa 1980–1986. Bonn 1989.
- with H. Klein, Friedrich Lüth: Tell Chuera in Nordost-Syrien 1982–1983. Berlin 1986.
- with E. Rova: Gräber des 3. Jahrtausends im syrischen Euphrattal II. Das Gräberfeld von Wreide. Saarbrücken 1991.
- with Abd el-Mesih Baghdo, Lutz Martin und Mirko Novák: Ausgrabungen auf dem Tell Halaf in Nordost-Syrien. Vorbericht über die erste und zweite Grabungskampagne, Harrasowitz, Wiesbaden 2009. ISBN 978-3-447-06068-4
- with Harald Klein, Friedrich Lüth: Tell Chuera in Nordost-Syrien. Vorläufiger Bericht über die neunte und zehnte Grabungskampagne 1982 und 1983, Berlin 1986.
- L'architecture religieuse de Tell Chuera, Akkadica 69 (1990) 1-18.
- Tell Chuera. Ausgrabungen der Max Freiherr von Oppenheim-Stiftung in Nordost-Syrien, Damaskus und Tartous 1990.
- Chuera, in: Harvey Weiss, Archaeology in Syria, American Journal of Archaeology 98 (1994) 120-122.
- with other contributors: Ausgrabungen in Tell Chuera in Nordost-Syrien I. Bericht über die Grabungskampagnen 1986 bis 1992, Saarbrücken 1995.
- with other contributors: Ausgrabungen in Tell Chuera in Nordost-Syrien I (Vorderasiatische Forschungen der Max-Freiherr v. Oppenheim-Stiftung, Volume 2), Saarbrücken: Saarbrücker Druckerei und Verlag, 1995
