= Jack Webb (footballer) =

Australian rules footballer (1905–1992)

Personal information
- Full name: Jack Webb
- Born: 27 May 1905
- Died: 23 May 1992 (aged 86)
- Original team: Granya
- Height: 182 cm (6 ft 0 in)

Playing career^{1}
Years	Club	Games (Goals)
1929	Footscray	2 (0)
1932	North Melbourne	1 (0)
Total		3 (0)
- ^{1} Playing statistics correct to the end of 1932.

Jack Webb (27 May 1905 – 23 May 1992) was a former Australian rules footballer who played with Footscray and North Melbourne in the Victorian Football League (VFL).
