= Ibrium =

Vizier of Ebla
- Tenure: c. 2342 – c. 2322 BC
- Predecessor: Arrukum
- Successor: Ibbi-Sipish
- King: Irkab-Damu; Isar-Damu
- Died: c. 2322 BC
- Issue: Ibbi-Sipish

Ibrium (died c. 2322 BC), also spelled Ebrium, was the vizier of Ebla for king Irkab-Damu and his successor Isar-Damu.

Ibrium is attested to have campaigned against the city of Abarsal during the time of vizier Arrukum. He took office after Arrukum during the last two years of Irkab-Damu's reign and continued to hold office during the reign of Isar-Damu. Ibrium kept his position for around 20 years and was succeeded by his son Ibbi-Sipish, thus establishing a parallel dynasty of viziers next to the royal family.

Ibrium waged a war against Armi in his ninth year as vizier. The Ebla tablets mention that the battle happened near a town called Batin (a location possibly located in modern northeastern Aleppo), and that a messenger arrived in Ebla with news about the defeating of Armi. He also conducted several campaigns against rebellious vassals and concluded a peace and trading treaty with Abarsal.

== See also ==
- Abraham (disambiguation)
- Eber
- Shu-Enlil
