= Delilah Pierce =

African American painter

Delilah W. Pierce
- Born: March 3, 1904; Washington, District of Columbia, United States
- Died: May 27, 1992 (aged 88); Washington, District of Columbia, United States
- Website: delilahwpierce.com

Delilah Williams Pierce (March 3, 1904 – 1992) was an African American artist, curator and educator based in Washington, District of Columbia. Pierce is best known for abstract paintings depicting the natural world. Her work also includes portraiture, landscapes, and still lifes.

One of her works is in the permanent collections of the Smithsonian Museum of American Art.

A month before her death in 1992, she obtained an honorary degree from the University of the District of Columbia, Washington, DC (DHL). She supported local education.

== Education ==
- Dunbar High School, Washington, D.C.
- 1923 Teachers Certification, Miner Normal School, Washington, D.C.
- 1925 Domestic Art Education Diploma, Miner Normal School, Washington, D.C.
- 1931 BS, Howard University, Washington, D.C.
- 1939 MA, Teachers College, Columbia University, New York, New York

== Notable works ==
- DC Waterfront, Maine Avenue, 1957, Smithsonian Museum of American Art, Washington, D.C.
- Gayhead Cliffs, Martha's Vineyard, not dated, Howard University Art Gallery, Washington, D.C.
