= Kevin O'Donovan (basketball) =

Irish basketball player

Personal information
- Nationality: Irish
- Born: 16 November 1921; Ballydehob, Ireland
- Died: 3 May 1992 (aged 70); Kilkenny, Ireland

Sport
- Sport: Basketball

Diarmuid Kevin O'Donovan (16 November 1921 – 3 May 1992) was an Irish basketball player. He competed in the men's tournament at the 1948 Summer Olympics.
