= Len Ortman =

Profile
- Position: Centre

Personal information
- Born: May 7, 1926; Francis, Saskatchewan
- Died: May 17, 1992 (aged 66); Regina, Saskatchewan
- Listed height: 5 ft 11 in (1.80 m)
- Listed weight: 212 lb (96 kg)

Career history
- 1946–1952: Saskatchewan Roughriders

Len Ortman (May 7, 1926 – May 17, 1992) was a Canadian professional football player who played for the Saskatchewan Roughriders. He played junior football in Regina.
