= Ebla tablets =

Collection of clay tablets from the ancient city of Ebla in Syria

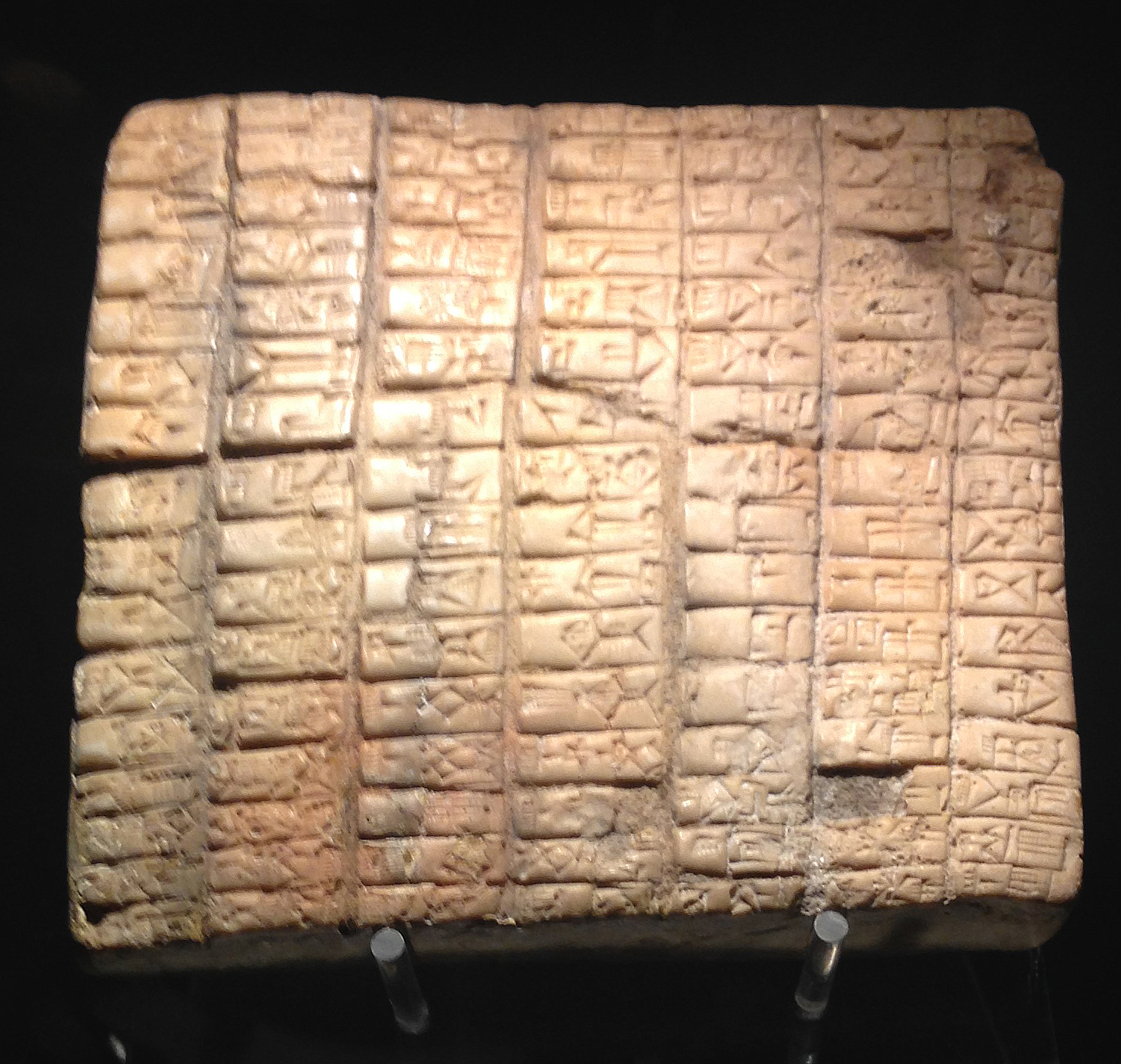
A tablet from the archive

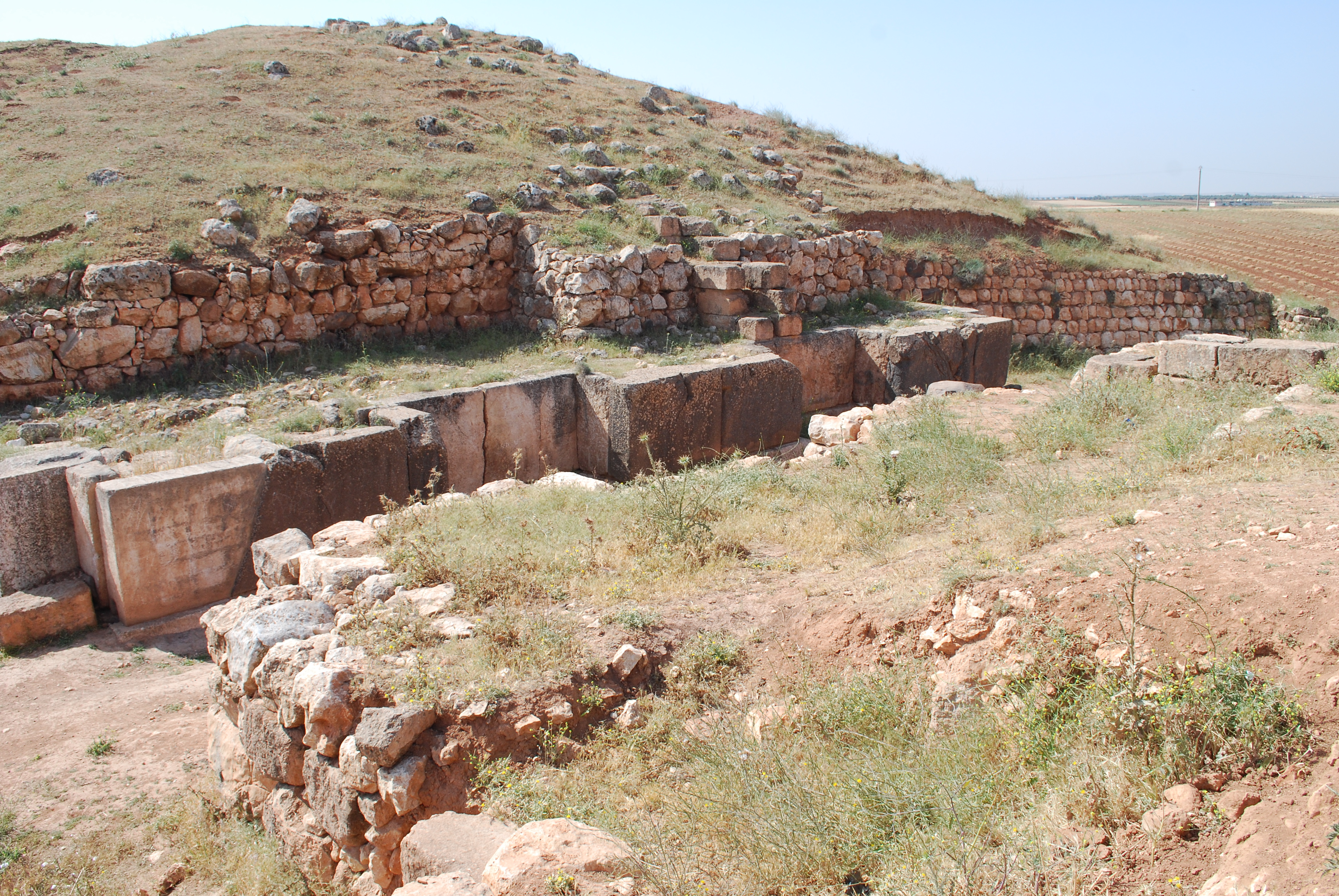
Parts of the excavations (Damascus gate)

The Ebla tablets are a collection of as many as 1,800 complete clay tablets, 4,700 fragments, and many thousands of minor chips found in the palace archives of the ancient city of Ebla, Syria. The tablets were discovered by Italian archaeologist Paolo Matthiae and his team in 1974–75 during their excavations at the ancient city at Tell Mardikh. The tablets, which were found in situ on collapsed shelves, retained many of their contemporary clay tags to help reference them. They all date to the period between c. 2500 BC and the destruction of the city c. 2250 BC. Today, the tablets are held in museums in the Syrian cities of Aleppo, Damascus, and Idlib.

== Discovery and archaeological context ==
The tablets were discovered just where they had fallen when their wooden shelves burned in the final conflagration of "Palace G". The archive was kept in orderly fashion in two small rooms off a large audience hall (with a raised dais at one end); one repository contained only bureaucratic economic records on characteristic round tablets, the other, larger room held ritual and literary texts, including pedagogical texts for teaching young scribes. Many of the tablets had not previously been baked, but the fire that destroyed the palace fired them almost as thoroughly as if in a kiln. They had been stored upright in partly recessed wooden shelves, rectos facing outward, leaning backwards at an angle so that the incipit of each tablet could be seen at a glance, and separated from one another by fragments of baked clay. The burning shelving pancaked – collapsing in place and preserving the order of the tablets.

== Language ==
Two languages appeared in the writing on the tablets: Sumerian, and a previously unknown language that used the Sumerian cuneiform script (Sumerian logograms or "Sumerograms") as a phonetic representation of the locally spoken Ebla language. The latter language was initially identified as proto-Canaanite by professor Giovanni Pettinato, who first deciphered the tablets, because it predated the Semitic languages of Canaan, like Ugaritic and Hebrew. Pettinato later retracted the designation and decided to call it simply "Eblaite", the name by which it is known today.

The purely phonetic use of Sumerian logograms marks a momentous advance in the history of writing. From the earlier system developed by Sumerian scribes that used a mix of logograms and phonetic signs, the scribes at Ebla employed a reduced number of signs entirely phonetically. This is the earliest example of transcription (rendering sounds in a system invented for another language) as well as a major simplifying step towards "reader friendliness" that would enable a wider spread of literacy in palace, temple and merchant contexts.

== Content and significance ==
The tablets provide a wealth of information on Syria and Canaan in the Early Bronze Age, and include the first known references to the "Canaanites", "Ugarit", and "Lebanon". The contents of the tablets reveal that Ebla was a major trade center. A main focus was economic records, inventories recording Ebla's commercial and political relations with other Levantine cities and logs of the city's import and export activities. For example, they reveal that Ebla produced a range of beers, including one that appears to be named "Ebla", for the city. Ebla was also responsible for the development of a sophisticated trade network system between city-states in northern Syria. This system grouped the region into a commercial community, which is clearly evidenced in the texts.

There are king lists for the city of Ebla, royal ordinances, edicts, and treaties. There are gazetteers listing place names, including a version of a standardized place-name list that has also been found at Abu Salabikh (possibly ancient Eresh) where it was dated to c. 2600 BC. The literary texts include hymns and rituals, epics, and proverbs.

=== Word lists ===
Many tablets include both Sumerian and Eblaite inscriptions with versions of three basic bilingual word lists contrasting words in the two languages. These have been heralded as the world's oldest known dictionaries. This structure has allowed modern scholars to clarify their understanding of the Sumerian language, at that time still a living language, because until the discovery of the tablet corpus there were no bilingual dictionaries with Sumerian and other languages, leaving pronunciation and other phonetic aspects of the language unclear.

The only tablets at Ebla that were written exclusively in Sumerian are lexical lists, probably for use in training scribes. The archives contain thousands of copybooks, lists for learning relevant jargon, and scratch pads for students, demonstrating that Ebla was a major educational center specializing in the training of scribes. Shelved separately with the dictionaries, there were also syllabaries of Sumerian words with their pronunciation in Eblaite.

=== Biblical archaeology ===
The application of the Ebla texts to specific places or people in the Bible occasioned controversy and focused on whether the tablets made references to, and thus confirmed, the existence of Abraham, David and Sodom and Gomorrah among other Biblical references. The sensationalist claims were made by Giovanni Pettinato and were coupled with delays in the publication of the complete texts, and it soon became an unprecedented academic crisis. The political context of the modern Arab–Israeli conflict also added fire to the debate, turning it into a debate about the proof for Zionist claims to Israel.

However, much of the initial media excitement about supposed Eblaite connections with the Bible, based on preliminary guesses and speculations by Pettinato and others, is now widely deplored as generated by "exceptional and unsubstantiated claims" and "great amounts of disinformation that leaked to the public". The present consensus is that Ebla's role in biblical archaeology, strictly speaking, is minimal.

== See also ==
- Cities of the Ancient Near East
- Short chronology timeline

== Bibliography ==
- Archi, Alfonso (2015), Ebla and Its Archives Texts, History, and Society, De Gruyter, ISBN 9781614517160 eISBN 9781614517887
- Pettinato, Giovanni (1981), The Archives of Ebla: An Empire Inscribed in Clay, Doubleday & Company, ISBN 0-385-13152-6 - In addition to copious observations on the contents, this volume includes many transcriptions and translations of tablets.
- Moorey, Peter Roger Stuart (1991), A century of biblical archaeology, Westminster John Knox Press, ISBN 978-0-664-25392-9.
- Dumper, Michael; Stanley, Bruce E. (2007), Cities of the Middle East and North Africa: A Historical Encyclopedia, ABC-CLIO, ISBN 978-1-57607-919-5.
- Chavalas, Mark W. (2003), Mesopotamia and the Bible, Continuum International Publishing Group, ISBN 978-0-567-08231-2.
