= Eblaite language =

Extinct Semitic language used in the third millennium BC

Eblaite
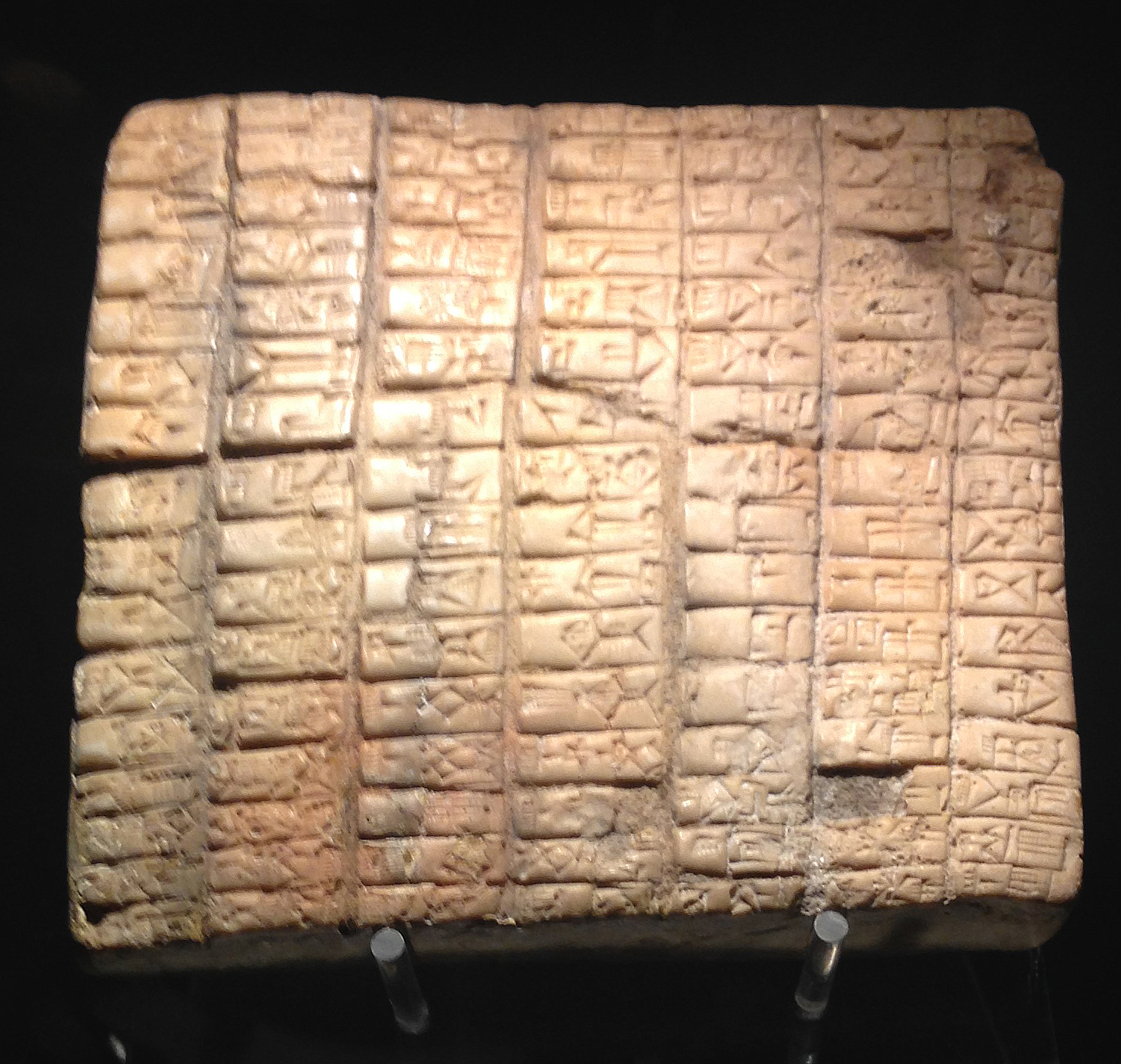
- Eblaite inscriptions found in Ebla
- Region: Ebla
- Era: 3rd millennium BC
- Language family: Afro-Asiatic: Semitic; East Semitic; Eblaite
- Writing system: Cuneiform

Language codes
- ISO 639-3: xeb
- Glottolog: ebla1238

Eblaite (/ˈɛblə.aɪt, ˈiːblə-/, also known as Eblan by ISO 639-3), or Palaeosyrian, is an extinct East Semitic language used during the 3rd millennium BC in Northern Syria. It was named after the ancient city of Ebla, in modern western Syria. Variants of the language were also spoken in Mari and Nagar. According to Cyrus H. Gordon, although scribes might have spoken it sometimes, Eblaite was probably not spoken much, being rather a written lingua franca with East and West Semitic features.

The language was discovered through cuneiform tablets found in Ebla.

== Discovery ==
Ebla and other principal sites of Syria and Mesopotamia in the second half of the third millennium BC.

The 1964 discovery at the Tell Mardikh site in Northern Syria of an ancient city from the second half of the third millennium BC completely altered archaeological knowledge of the time, as it indicated the existence of a contemporary urban culture during the Early Dynastic Period of Mesopotamia, within a geographic zone where, at the time, previous excavations had revealed nothing on the same scale.

In agreement with Ignace Gelb's theories on the subject of all inhabited centers in Syria of the same era, it appeared that the Tell Mardikh civilization's cultural identity did not necessarily fall within the Semitic family. However, in 1968, the discovery at the same site of a statue bearing an ancient Akkadian inscription, mentioning the king Ibbit-Lim of Ebla, soon contradicted this hypothesis. It therefore became possible not only to identify this city as the ancient city of Ebla, referred to in numerous Mesopotamian and Egyptian sources, but additionally, considering the strong linguistic connotations of the king's name, to specify the identity as Amorite. It became necessary, however, to revise these conclusions again, after the 1974 discovery in the ancient ruins of a Bronze Age palace (2400–2225 BC) of 42 cuneiform tablets, then of 17,000 others the following year, revealing a language different from Amorite, which exhibited archaic morphological characteristics present in Akkadian, with incontestable lexical similarities to West Semitic languages such as Hebrew or Aramaic. Excavations were directed by Professor Paolo Matthiae and the inscriptions translated by Giovanni Pettinato.

This opposition between a West Semitic lexicon and an Akkadian morphology led to controversies surrounding the nature of this language. For P. Fronzaroli, the opposition suggested an Akkadian dialect that had undergone a strong Western influence. On the other hand, Giovanni Garbini favored a more nuanced approach, drawing attention to the fragility of a comparison with Akkadian, and pointing out that there is no other contemporary model with which to draw comparisons. In his "Considerations on the Language of Ebla", he highlighted the artificial character of this opposition between morphology and lexicon and noted that "Akkadian differs from Western Semitic as we knew it hitherto because the latter was documented only on the phase following Amorite innovation. If it is traced back to the time before these innovations, a northwestern pre-Amorite Semitic begins to emerge, which is concordant with Akkadian just because the latter preserved its earlier character after Amorite invasion". Essentially basing his study on the lexicon, G. Pettinato was nevertheless the first to announce in 1975 the discovery of a new Semitic language, to which he gave the name "Paleo-Canaanite." Although the academic community was in favor of this idea, they were not unanimous regarding Pettinato's proposed name. In fact, while indicating advantageously its similarity to Hebrew, Ugaritic, or Phoenician, the name proved nevertheless incapable of indicating its morphological roots in East Semitic languages. G. Garbini then proposed the term "Paleo-Syrian," but again, this proved just as inadequate to convey the Mesopotamian particularities and was not accepted. Therefore, without a name to fit this new language's different linguistic characteristics, "Eblaite" was finally chosen.

=== Nature of the documents ===
Of the Eblaite corpus, whose publication began in 1974 as stated above, the majority of discovered documents are administrative or economic in nature, along with about a hundred historical tablets as well as some scholastic writings: lexicons, syllabaries, or bilingual texts. To this list, we must also add a few rare literary texts: fragments of myths, epics, hymns, proverbs, as well as some documents for conjuration.

From a linguistic perspective, although a great number of these documents were effectively written in Sumerian, a rather large portion of these only used the language ideogrammatically, as confirmed by certain Semitic elements added to the Sumerograms – such as morphological markers, suffix pronouns, or certain prepositions – which reveal an underlying language distinct from Sumerian.

in U_{4} DINGIR a-mu-su_{3} NIDBA

"the day when the god of his father had his festival"

Such writing practices obviously made approaching Eblaite difficult. Fortunately, some rare documents, bilingual letters or tablets, mostly written syllabically, enabled the breaking down of this graphical barrier and the clarification of our knowledge of this language.

Of course, even if we add to this collection the onomastic material, which in Semitic languages typically consists of short sentences, the portion of the Eblaite corpus that is usable from a linguistic perspective remains relatively narrow and limited from a morphological, syntactical, or lexical point of view.

=== The graphical barrier and writing practices ===
The main difficulty faced by those studying the language of Ebla arose largely from issues in the writing system. Indeed, Eblaite shares its cuneiform writing system with the Sumerian, Akkadian, Hittite, Hurrian, and Elamite languages, a graphical system where each symbol may have collectively or separately an ideogrammatic and/or phonetic value. In the first case, the symbol or chain of symbols simply signifies an idea that is understandable by way of its Sumerian meaning; in the second case, the symbol indicates, with a more-or-less large approximation based on writing practices, the form of an Eblaite term following a principle of syllabic decomposition.

The comparative study of Eblaite symbols reveals some differences with the systems used by other schools of scribes. On the other hand, the Eblaite syllabary, without being identical, bears significant similarities with that of the ancient Akkadian used in Kish during the Early Dynastic Period (DA II).

In fact, three transcription practices appear in the Ebla texts: one exclusively syllabic, another using both syllabism and ideography, and the last largely employing the ideographic principle. Included in the first category is mostly the incantatory texts and the writing of anthroponyms; in the second, the epistolary, historical, and literary documents, not to mention some diplomatic texts; and in the third, economic and administrative texts, relating to the management and stewardship of the palace where ideography is a sufficient system for the writing of realia. Qualitatively and quantitatively, this situation entirely resembles that of the Mesopotamian corpus.

Only a small portion of documents found are syllabic, compared to the large quantity of texts written using Sumerian logograms. This led G. Pettinato to consider, at first, that these documents were written in Sumerian. Such a hypothesis obviously no longer holds today with regard to our understanding of the writing and formulation practices particular to Sumerian and Eblaite scribes. These graphical conventions are so specific that they are very often sufficient to identify the language underlying the ideograms. Thus, for example, the Sumerian practice of writing filiation following the formula X DUMU Y ("X son of Y") stands out from the Akkadian and Eblaite practice which prefers the phrasing X DUMU.NITA Y.

However, if, as we just saw, we can identify a signified of Semitic origin beneath a Sumerogram, it remains difficult to extract its signifier. Fortunately, the restoration of phonetic values to these symbols has been made possible by the existence of bilingual lexical lists, where each Sumerian ideogram has its Eblaite form specified in a glossary using syllabic writing.

Even when the phonetic value of the word is specified, a whole series of semantic problems remains, still obstructing our understanding. For example, when an Eblaite scribe uses the symbol LUGAL meaning "king" in Sumerian, he transcribes it with its Akkadian value šarrum but translates it as "dignitary." This simple example shows the gaps in interpretation that may result from reading Eblaite symbols while only considering their Sumerian values.

As for the strictly syllabic system of writing, it is not free of issues either. The rarity of Vowel + Consonant -type symbols (VC) require certain approximations in the transcription of words. Thus we find the term ʾummum "mother" syllabically rendered as u_{3}-mu-mu. Additionally, while Sumerian sometimes proceeds morphologically by reduplication of a word to make it plural, Eblaite reuses this practice with the same meaning, but transforming it into a simple graphical signified. In this way we find forms along the lines of nasi_{11}-nasi_{11} to write the plural of nas_{11} "the people." Furthermore it is not uncommon that the writing presents a defective character, where all the morphological markers are not indicated: ḫa-za-an šu-ba-ti = *ḫazānum yimḫur "the mayor takes it."

To these issues we can also add those connected with the intrinsic limits of the Sumerian writing system, incapable of rendering a portion of Semitic languages' phonological system. As Diakonoff specifies, the Sumerian system is organized upon a tense~lax opposition and can only with great difficulty render the voiced~unvoiced opposition as well as the emphatics of Semitic languages. Thus we find the syllables /da/, /ṭa/, and /ta/ transcribed with the same symbol DA, as well as the syllables /gu/, /ku/, and /qu/ with the same symbol GU.

For the same reasons, it is equally impossible for the Sumerian writing system to render the laryngeals and pharyngeals of Eblaite. However, to overcome these difficulties, they used – just like ancient Akkadian – graphical conventions such as the use of the symbols E and MA to render the phonemes /ḥ/ or /ʿ/, or else by playing on syllabic symbols which end in the vowel /e/, which is nothing but the vocalic trace of one of the two preceding articulations.

Additionally, as shown by the written forms la-ḫa for /laḫān/ or ba-da-a for /baytay/ for example, the phonemes /w/, /y/, /m/, and /n/ are not rendered graphically in the final or initial position. Taking these two examples again, notice that, for one, the quantity of the vowels is not rendered by the writing (the form da-za-a for /taṣṣaʾā/ "they will go out" shows us that double consonants face the same fate) and secondly, that the vowel /a/ is used equally to represent the syllables /ʾa/, /ya/, and /ay/.

== Phonological system ==
As shown above, the difficulties with reading Eblaite texts complicate approaching its phonological system.

Studying the usage context for the symbols I, I_{2}, A, ʾA, ḪA, etc. with regard to the writing conventions of Akkadian scribes enabled the determination, beyond some identification difficulties created by the graphical barrier, of "the existence and autonomy of the phonemes /h/, /ḥ/, and /ḫ/ confirmed by the realization of the vowel /a/ as [ɛ] in the closed syllables /ḥaC/ and /ʾaC/, as well as the tendency to extend this phenomenon to the vowel /a/ followed by a pharyngeal. It is currently lacking the elements to determine the existence of a phoneme /ġ/ or a variant [ġ]."

Also through a contextual analysis of the symbols z + Vowel (V): ze_{2}, s + V: se_{11}, š + V, Pelio Fronzaroli confirmed the existence of the phonemes /s/, /ṣ/, /ḍ/, and /ẓ/, as well as the phonemes /s/, /š/, and /ṯ/, a group to which it is perhaps also necessary to add /z/.

As for the existence of diphthongs, this remains questionable. The diphthong /ay/ seems to be conserved in Eblaite as illustrated by the form /ʿayn-ʿayn/ though it is still preserved in other semitic languages which have lost the diphthong. However, the reality of this phoneme is heavily discussed by I. Gelb: "The main difference between Fronzaroli's treatment of the diphthong /aj/ at Ebla and mine is that Fronzaroli believes (...) that the original diphthong /aj/ was preserved in Eblaite (even though not written), while I take it to have developed to /ā/."

Here we should also highlight the issue of the unstable realization of liquids with the alternation of /r/ and /l/. I. Gelb speculated two reasons for this phenomenon: "If the weakness of the r / l phoneme (which is amply exemplified at Ebla) should be considered as an indication of the Hurrian influence on Eblaic phonology, then we should note that this feature is characteristic not only of Hurrian (and other languages in the general area), but also of Egyptian, and may therefore be either a surviving feature of the Semito-Hamitic (or Afro-Asiatic) or a cross-linguistic areal feature."

== Pronominal system ==
Eblaite has two forms of personal pronouns: independent and suffix. Additionally, the texts have also revealed a determinative pronominal form as well as interrogative forms. The epigraphical material does not always allow a complete reconstruction of the paradigms, and the gaps must be filled on the basis of linguistic comparisons as well as internal reconstitutions that take the language's own structures into account.

Independent Pronouns
		Singular		Plural	
Person		written	value	written	value
1st person		ANA	/ʾanā/	–	*/naḥnu/
2nd person	masculine	AN-DA	/ʾantā/	AN-DA-NU	/'antanu/
2nd person	feminine	–	*/ʾanti/	–	*/ʾantina/
3rd person	masculine	SU-WA	/šuwā/	SU-NU	/šunū/
3rd person	feminine	SI-A	/šiyā/	–	*/šinā/

Special forms for the masculine second and third person accusative and dative:

Suffix forms
		Genitive		Accusative		Dative	
Person		written	value	written	value	written	value
		Singular					
1st person		-I	/-iyV/	-NI	/-ni/	–	–
2nd person	masculine	-GA	/-ka/	-GA	/-ka/	-KUM	/-kum/
2nd person	feminine	-GI	/-ki/	-GI	/-ki/	–	–
3rd person	masculine	-SU, -SU	/-šu/	-SU, -SU	/-šu/	-SU-UM	/-šum/
3rd person	feminine	-SA	/-šā/	–	–	–	–
		Plural					
3rd person	masculine	-SU-NU	/-šunu/	–	–	–	–
3rd person	feminine	-SI-NA	/-šina/	-SI-NA-AT	/-šināt/	–	–

=== Determinative pronouns ===
	Nominative		Genitive		Accusative	
	singular	plural	singular	plural	singular	plural
masculine	SU	–	SI	SU-TI	SA	–
feminine	SA-DU	SA-DU	SA-TI	SA-TI	–	–

=== Interrogative pronouns ===
	Nominative		Genitive		Accusative	
	written	value	written	value	written	value
animate	MA-NU	/mannu/	MA-NA	/manna/	–	–
inanimate	MI-(NU)	/mīnu/	MI-NA	/mīna/	MI-NE-IS	/mīniš/

=== Indefinite pronouns ===
	Nominative		Genitive		Accusative	
	written	value	written	value	written	value
animate	MA-NU-MA	/mannuma/	MA-NA-MA	/mannama/	–	–
inanimate	MI-NU-MA	/mīnuma/	ME-NA-MA	/mīnama/	ME-NE-MA	/mīnema/

== Nominal system ==
Eblaite presents a nominal system that is comparable to that of Akkadian and whose traces are found in certain Semitic languages. In particular, there are three inflectional categories: gender, with masculine and feminine forms; number, with singular, dual, and plural; and finally case, covering both syntactical relationships like the nominative, accusative, and genitive cases, but also more concrete relationships like the dative and locative cases. This organization of the nominal morphology was likely that of all Semitic languages until the first millennium BC.

=== Noun declension ===
Masculine nouns
	nominative	accusative	genitive	dative	locative
singular	-u(m)	-a(m)	-i(m)	-iš	-um
plural	-ū	-ī	-ī	-	-
dual	-ān	-ayn	-ayn	-	-

Feminine Nouns
	nominative	accusative	genitive	dative	locative
singular	-atu(m)	-ata(m)	-ati(m)	-	-
plural	-ātu(m)	-ātim	-	-	-
dual	-ātān	-	-	-	-

== Verbal system ==
Eblaite's verbal system follows the same structure as that of other Semitic languages, where the paradigmatic framework is organized based upon a double axis: the derivational axis, within which the verb's basic form goes through a certain number of modifications, and the inflectional axis, where the verb takes on an aspectual, personal, or modal value through a system of suffixation and prefixation.

== Classification ==
Eblaite has been described as an East Semitic language or a "North Semitic" language; scholars notice the great affinity between Eblaite and pre-Sargonic Akkadian and debate the relationship between the two.

=== East Semitic classification ===
- Scholars such as Richard I. Caplice, Ignace Gelb and John Huehnergard have the view that Eblaite is an East Semitic language not to be seen as an early Akkadian dialect, because the differences from other Akkadian dialects are considerable.
- Manfred Krebernik says that Eblaite "is so closely related to Akkadian that it may be classified as an early Akkadian dialect", although some of the names that appear in the tablets are Northwest Semitic.

=== North Semitic classification ===
- Edward Lipiński, claiming that in the third millennium BC, there was no clear border between East Semitic languages and West Semitic languages, calls Eblaite "Paleosyrian" and explains the similarities to Akkadian by the use of the same system of writing borrowed from Sumer. Lipiński separates Eblaite from Akkadian, assigning the latter to the East Semitic languages while classifying Eblaite with Amorite and Ugaritic into a grouping he names the North Semitic languages.

By supporters of a classification as East Semitic, Eblaite is considered a language which exhibits both West Semitic and East Semitic features. Grammatically, Eblaite is more similar to Akkadian, but lexically and in some grammatical forms, Eblaite is more similar to West Semitic languages.

== Bibliography ==
- Alfonso Archi 1987. “ Ebla and Eblaite ” in Eblaitica : Essays on the Ebla Archives and Eblaite Language. Publications of the Center for Ebla Research at New York University. Vol n^{o} 1 edited by C. Gordon. Eisenbrauns, p. 7–17
- A. Cagni 1981. La lingua di Ebla, Atti del convegno internazionale (Napoli, 21–23 Aprile 1980). Istituto universitario orientale, Series Minor XIV, Naples.
- R. Caplice 1981. “Eblaite and Akkadian” in La lingua di Ebla, Atti del convegno internazionale (Napoli, 21–23 Aprile 1980). Istituto universitario orientale, Series Minor XIV, Naples. p. 161–164
- K. Cathart 1984. “The Language of Ebla” in Proceeding of Irish Biblical Association (I.B.A.) n^{o} 8, edited by A. D. H. Mayes. Dublin. p. 49–56
- M. Civil 1984. “Bilingualism in logographically written languages : Sumerian in Ebla” in Il Bilinguismo a Ebla, Atti del convegni internazionale (Napoli 19–22 aprile 1982) a cura di Luigi Cagni, Naples, p. 75–97
- G. Conti 1984. “Arcaismi in Eblaita” in Studies on the language of Ebla. Edited by Pelio Fronzaroli. Quaderni di Semitica n^{o} 13. Istituto di Linguistica e di Lingue orientali, Universita di Firenze. Florence. p. 159–172
- M. Dahood 1981. “The linguistic classification of Eblait” in La lingua di Ebla, Atti del convegno internazionale (Napoli, 21–23 Aprile 1980). Istituto universitario orientale, Series Minor XIV, Naples. p. 177–179
- I. Diakonoff 1984. “An evaluation of Eblaite” in Studies on the langage of Ebla. Edited by Pelio Fronzaroli. Quaderni di Semitica n^{o} 13. Istituto di Linguistica e di Lingue orientali, Universita di Firenze. Florence. p. 1–10
- Igor Diakonoff 1990. “The importance of Ebla for History and Linguistics” in Eblaitica, Essays on the Ebla Archives and Eblaite Language. Vol n°2, edited by Cyrus Gordon, Winona Lake, Indiana. pp. 3–29
- P. Fronzaroli 1977. “L’interferenza linguistica nella Siria settentrionale del III milenio” in Interferenza linguistica, Atti del convegno della Societa di Glottologia. Perugia p. 27–43
- P. Fronzaroli 1978. “La contribution de la langue d’Ebla à la connaissance du sémitique archaïque” in (C.R.R.A.) n^{o} 25 p. 27–43
- P. Fronzaroli 1979. “Problemi di fonetica eblaita” in Studi Eblaitica n^{o} 1. Rome p. 64–89
- P. Fronzaroli 1982. “Per una valutazione della morphologia eblaita” in Studi Eblaiti n^{o} 5. Rome p. 95 120
- P. Fronzaroli 1984. “The Eblaic Lexicon : Problems and Appraisal” in Studies on the langage of Ebla. Edited by Pelio Fronzaroli. Quaderni di Semitica n^{o} 13. Istituto di Linguistica e di Lingue orientali, Universita di Firenze. Florence. p. 117–157
- Garbini, Giovanni (1981). "Considerations on the Language of Ebla". La Lingua Di Ebla: Atti Del Convegno Internazionale (1st ed.). Napoli: Istituto universitario orientale, Seminario di studi asiatici. pp. 75–82.
- G. Garbini 1984. “La lingua di Ebla” in Le lingue semitiche, Studi di Storia linguistica. Istituto universitario Orientale, Series Minor XX. Naples. p. 65–78
- I. J. Gelb 1958. “La lingua degli Amoriti” in Atti della Accademia Nazionale dei Lincei, Rendiconti morali, Serie VIII, vol n°XIII fasc. 3–4, p. 143–164
- I. J. Gelb 1961 a. Old akkadian writing and Grammar. Material for the Assyrian dictionary n^{o} 2, second édition, revised and enlarged. Chicago.
- I. J. Gelb 1961 b. “The Early History of West Semitic Peoples” in Journal of Cuneiform Studies n^{o} 15, p. 27–47
- I. J. Gelb 1977. “Thought about Ibla, A preliminary Evaluation," March 1977 in Monographic Journals of the Near East, Syro-Mesopotamian Studies I/1, pp. 3–30
- I. J. Gelb 1981. “ Ebla and the Kish civilisation” in La lingua di Ebla, Atti del convegno internazionale (Napoli, 21–23 Aprile 1980). Istituto universitario orientale, Series Minor XIV, Naples. pp. 9–73
- Cyrus Gordon 1990. “Eblaite and Northwest Semitic” in Eblaitica: Essays on the Ebla Archives and Eblaite Language. Publications of the Center for Ebla Research at New York University. Vol n°2 edited by C. Gordon. Eisenbrauns, pp. 127–139
- C. Gordon 1991. “Eblaite” in Semitic Studies in honor of Wolf Leslau, On the occasion of his eighty-fyfth birthday. Vol n°1, edited by Alan S. Kaye, Wiesbaden. pp. 550–557
- C. Gordon 1997. "Amorite and Eblaite," The Semitic Languages. Ed. Robert Hetzron. New York: Routledge.
- J. Huehnergard, 2004. "Akkadian and Eblaite" in R. Woodard The Cambridge Encyclopedia of the World's Ancient Languages. Cambridge.
- E. Knudsen 1982. “An analysis of Amorite, A review article”, in Journal of Cuneiform Studies. Vol n^{o} 34 / 1–2, Philadelphia. p. 1–18
- E. Knudsen 1991. “Amorite Grammar, A comparative statement” in Semitic Studies in honor of Wolf Leslau, On the occasion of his eighty-fyfth birthday. Vol n^{o} 1, edited by Alan S. Kaye, Wiesbaden. p. 866–885
- Manfred Krebernik. 1996. "The Linguistic Classification of Eblaite: Methods, Problems, and Results." In The Study of the Ancient Near East in the Twenty-First Century: The William Foxwell Albright Centennial Conference (eds. J.S. Cooper – G.M. Schwartz), pp. 233–249.
- W. Lambert 1981. “The Language of Ebla and Akkadian” in La lingua di Ebla, Atti del convegno internazionale (Napoli, 21–23 Aprile 1980). Istituto universitario orientale, Series Minor XIV, Naples. p. 155–160
- E. Lipinsky 1981. “Formes verbales dans les noms propres d’Ebla et le système verbal sémitique” in La lingua di Ebla, Atti del convegno internazionale (Napoli, 21–23 Aprile 1980). Istituto universitario orientale, Series Minor XIV, Naples. p. 191–210
- Lipiński, Edward (1997). Semitic Languages: Outline of a Comparative Grammar (1st ed.). Leuven: Peeters Publishers. ISBN 9789068319392.
- Lipiński, Edward (2001) [1997]. Semitic Languages: Outline of a Comparative Grammar (2nd ed.). Leuven: Peeters Publishers. ISBN 9789042908154.
- M. Liverani 1965. Missione Archeologica Italiana in Siria 1964. Rome
- H.-P. Müller 1984. “Neue Erwägungen zum eblaitischen verbalsystem” in Il Bilinguismo a Ebla, Atti del convegni internazionale (Napoli 19–22 aprile 1982) a cura di Luigi Cagni, Naples, p. 167–204.
- R. Mugnaioni 2000. "À propos de la langue d’Ebla" in Travaux 16 – La sémitologie aujourd’hui, Cercle de Linguistique d’Aix-en-Provence, Centre des sciences du langage, p. 33–56.
- G. Pettinato 1970. “L’inscription de Ibbit-Lim roi d’Ebla” in A.A.A.S. p. 19–22
- G. Pettinato 1972. "L’Inscription de Ibbit-Lim roi d’Ebla” in Missione Archeologica Italiana in Siria 1967–1968. Rome.
- G. Pettinato 1975. “Testi cuneiformi del 3° millenio in paleo-cananeo rinvenuti nelle campagna 1974 a Tell Mardikh-Ebla" in Orientalia n°44, pp. 361–374
- G. Pettinato 1979. Catalogo dei testi cuneiformi di Tell Mardikh in M.E.E.
- K. Petracek 1984. “Les catégories flexionnelles en éblaïtes” in Studies on the Language of Ebla. Quaderni di Semitistica n°13, édité par P. Fronzaroli. Florence, pp. 24–57
- G. Rubio 2006. "Eblaite, Akkadian, and East Semitic." In The Akkadian Language in its Semitic Context (ed. N.J.C. Kouwenberg and G. Deutscher. Leiden: Nederlands Instituut voor het Nabije Oosten), pp. 110–139.
- W. von Soden 1995: Grundriß der akkadischen Grammatik, 3. ergänzte Auflage. Analecta Oientalia n^{o} 33, Rome.
