= Sagisu =

King of Ebla
- Reign: c. 2680 BC
- Predecessor: Possibly Da (.) (.)
- Successor: Possibly Dane'um

Sagisu (also Sagishu; fl. c. 2680 BC) was a king (Malikum) of the first Eblaite kingdom ruling c. 2680 BC. The king's name is translated as "DN has killed". (Note: DN is an abbreviation of "Divine Name")

Eblaites practiced the worship of deceased kings; the cult of Sagisu was maintained in Ebla and was of importance during the enthronement of new kings. Offerings were presented to Sagisu during the coronation festivals of kings Irkab-Damu and Isar-Damu; this prove the continuity of the royal family of Ebla.

King Sagisu of Ebla
Regnal titles
Preceded by Possibly Da (.) (.)	King of Ebla c. 2680 BC	Succeeded by Possibly Dane'um
