= Giovanni Pettinato =

Italian paleographer

Portrait of Giovanni Pettinatto

Giovanni Pettinato (30 April 1934, in Troina – 19 May 2011, in Rome) was an Assyriologist and paleographer of writings from the ancient Near East, specializing in the Eblaite language, His major contributions to the field include the deciphering of the Eblaite script, discovered by Paolo Matthiae in 1974–75.

Pettinato graduated from Heidelberg in 1968, where he had studied for ten years. In 1968 he began teaching Assyriology at the University of Rome.

Pettinato died on 19 May 2011 at the age of 76. He was an emeritus of several associations, including the Accademia dei Lincei and authored several publications about the Sumerian and Mesopotamian civilizations.
