= Immeya =

King of Ebla
- Reign: c. 1750 - c. 1725 BC
- Died: c. 1725 BC
- Burial: "Tomb of the Lord of the Goats", in Ebla

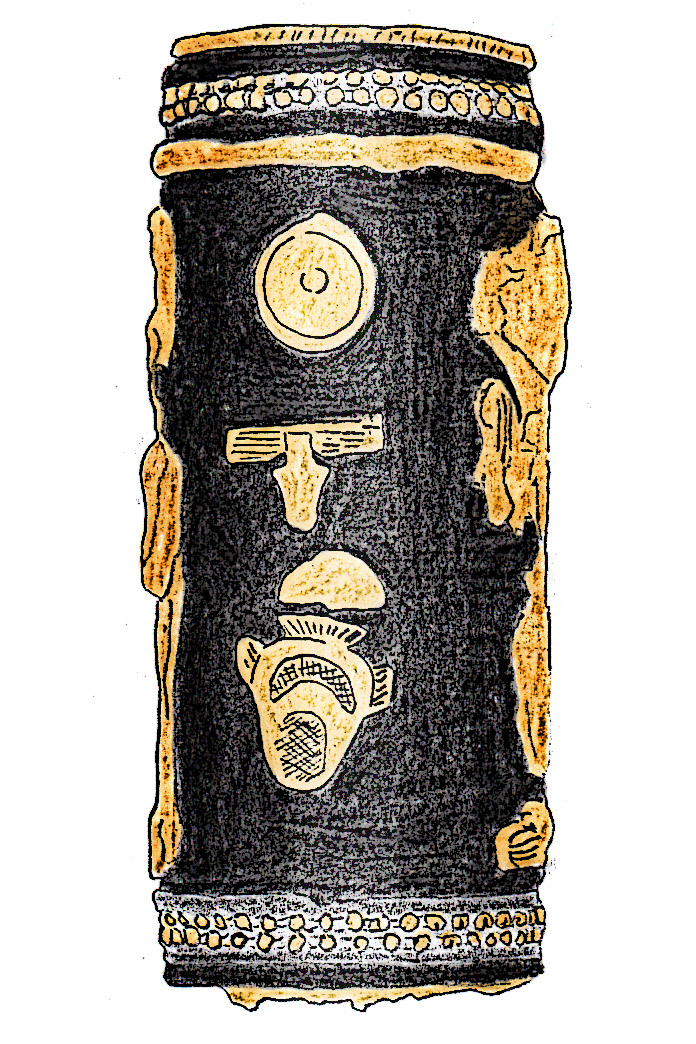
Drawing of the mace handle with Hotepibre's name, gift for Immeya

Immeya (died c. 1725 BC) was a king of Ebla, in modern Syria, reigning around 1750–1725 BC, during the Middle Bronze Age II.

== Reign ==
Immeya was most likely buried in the so-called "Tomb of the Lord of the Goats", in the royal necropolis of the western palace at Ebla, as suggested by a silver cup found here, bearing an inscription in his name. Likewise the other grave goods in the tomb probably also belonged to Immeya. Comprising some objects in carved hippopotamus ivory, the remains of a throne decorated with bronze goat heads, and especially an ancient Egyptian ceremonial mace made of gold, silver and ivory, a gift from the 13th Dynasty king Hotepibre, who was a contemporary of Immeya.

Immeya also appears as the sender of a letter to a ruler, which was also found at Ebla. One of his successors—not necessarily the direct one—was a certain king Hammu[...], whose full name was probably Hammurabi.

As with other rulers of the third kingdom of Ebla, Immeya's name is Amorite; furthermore, it seems that "Immeya" was a hypocorism.
