= Ebla =

Ancient Syrian city

- 𒌈𒆷 (Sumerian)
- Tell Mardikh تل مرديخ
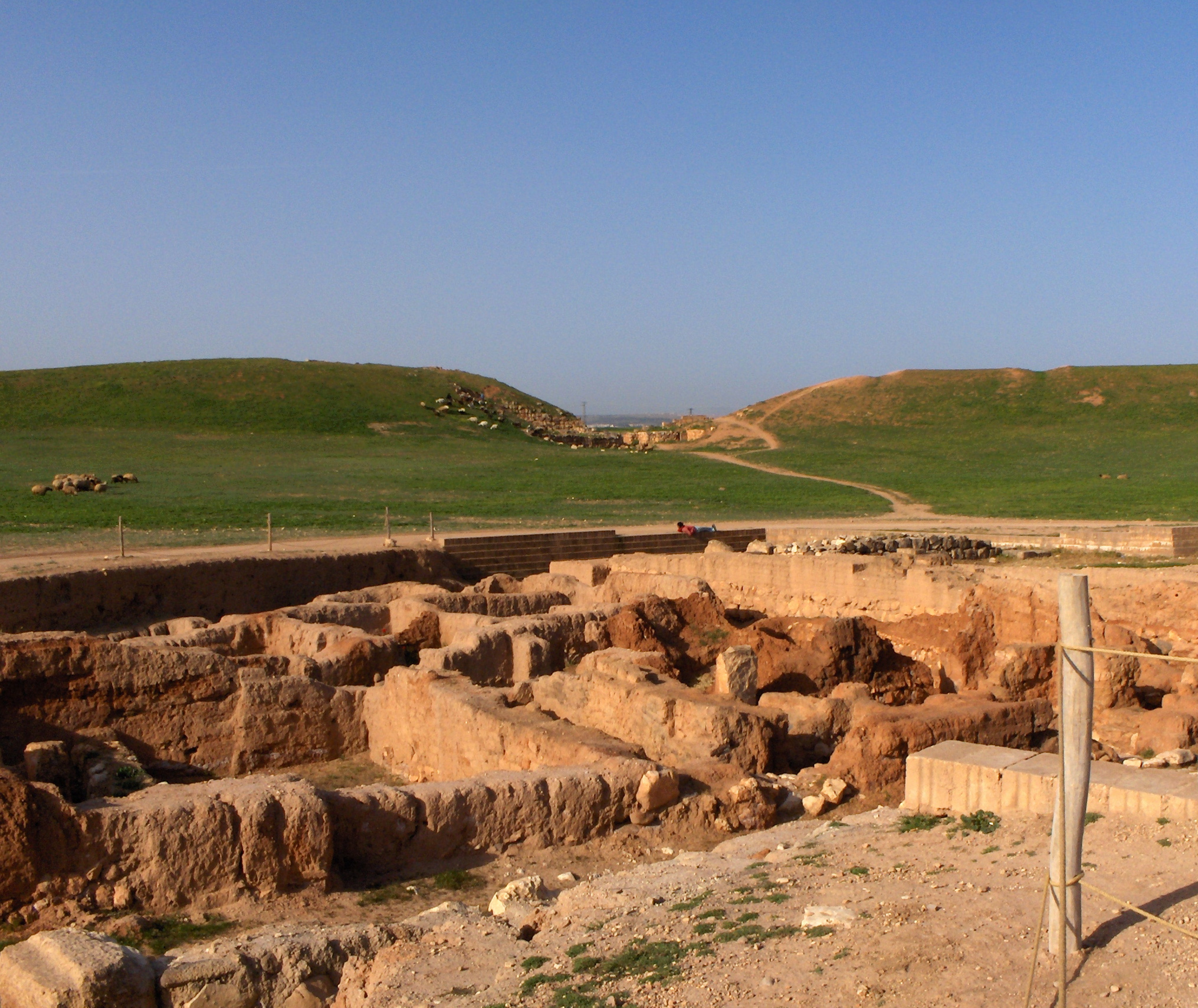
- Ruins of the outer wall and the "Damascus Gate"

- Location within Syria
- 35.798°N 36.798°E
- Type: settlement
- Periods: Bronze Age
- Cultures: Kish civilization, Amorite
- Location: Idlib Governorate, Syria

History
- Built: c. 3500 BC
- Abandoned: 7th century AD

Site notes
- Excavation dates: 1964–2011
- Archaeologists: Paolo Matthiae
- Condition: Ruined
- Owner: Public
- Public access: Yes

Ebla (Sumerian: 𒌈𒆷 eb₂-la, Arabic: إبلا, modern: تل مرديخ, Tell Mardikh) was a Bronze Age polity in modern Syria. Its remains constitute a tell located about 55 km (34 mi) southwest of Aleppo near the village of Mardikh. Ebla was an important Levantine center throughout the 3rd millennium BC and in the first half of the 2nd millennium BC.

Starting as a small settlement in the Early Bronze Age (c. 3500 BC), Ebla developed into a trading empire and later into an expansionist power that imposed its hegemony over much of northern and eastern Syria. Ebla was destroyed during the 23rd century BC. It was then rebuilt and is mentioned in the records of the Third Dynasty of Ur. The second Ebla was a continuation of the first, ruled by a new royal dynasty. It was destroyed at the end of the 3rd millennium BC, which paved the way for the Amorite tribes to settle in the city, forming the third Ebla. The third kingdom also flourished as a trade center; it became a subject and an ally of Yamhad (modern-day Aleppo) until its final destruction by the Hittites Mursili I in c. 1600 BC.

Ebla maintained its prosperity through a vast trading network. Artifacts from Sumer, Cyprus, Egypt and as far as Afghanistan were recovered from the city's palaces. The kingdom had its own language, Eblaite, and the political organization of Ebla had features different from the Sumerian model. Women enjoyed a special status, and the queen had major influence in the state and religious affairs. The pantheon of gods was mainly north Semitic and included deities exclusive to Ebla. The city was excavated from 1964 and became famous for the Ebla tablets, an archive of about 20,000 cuneiform tablets found there, dated to 2500 BC–2350 BC. (Note: All dates in this article are estimated by the Middle Chronology, unless stated otherwise.) Written in both Sumerian and Eblaite with cuneiform script, the archive has allowed a better understanding of the Sumerian language as well as Levantine political organization and social customs of the mid-3rd millennium BC.

Based on remote sensing as of 2022, the site has been and continued to be heavily damaged by military activity and associated looting. Especially important, "The central high mound was badly damaged in February 2017 by military trenching and looting, which became even more severe by October 2022".

== Etymology ==
The word "Ebla" may derive from a Semitic word meaning "white rock", possibly referring to the limestone outcrop on which the city was built. It has been reported that local people still often use the toponym Tell Abyad (Arabic: تل أبيض, tal ˈabyaḍ), literally "White Hill".

== History ==
=== Chalcolithic ===
Artifacts from the late Ubaid and late Chalcolithic periods were recovered from the central mound.

=== Early Bronze ===
Ebla was first settled around 3500 BC; its growth was supported by many satellite agricultural settlements. The city benefited from its role as an entrepôt of growing international trade, which probably began with an increased demand for wool in Sumer. Archaeologists designate this early habitation period "Mardikh I"; it ended around 3000 BC.

Mardikh I is followed by the first and second kingdoms era between about 3000 and 2000 BC, designated "Mardikh II". I. J. Gelb considered Ebla a part of the Kish civilization, which was a cultural entity of East Semitic-speaking populations that stretched from the center of Mesopotamia to the western Levant.

==== First kingdom ====
First Eblaite Kingdom Ebla
- c. 3000 BC–c. 2300 BC
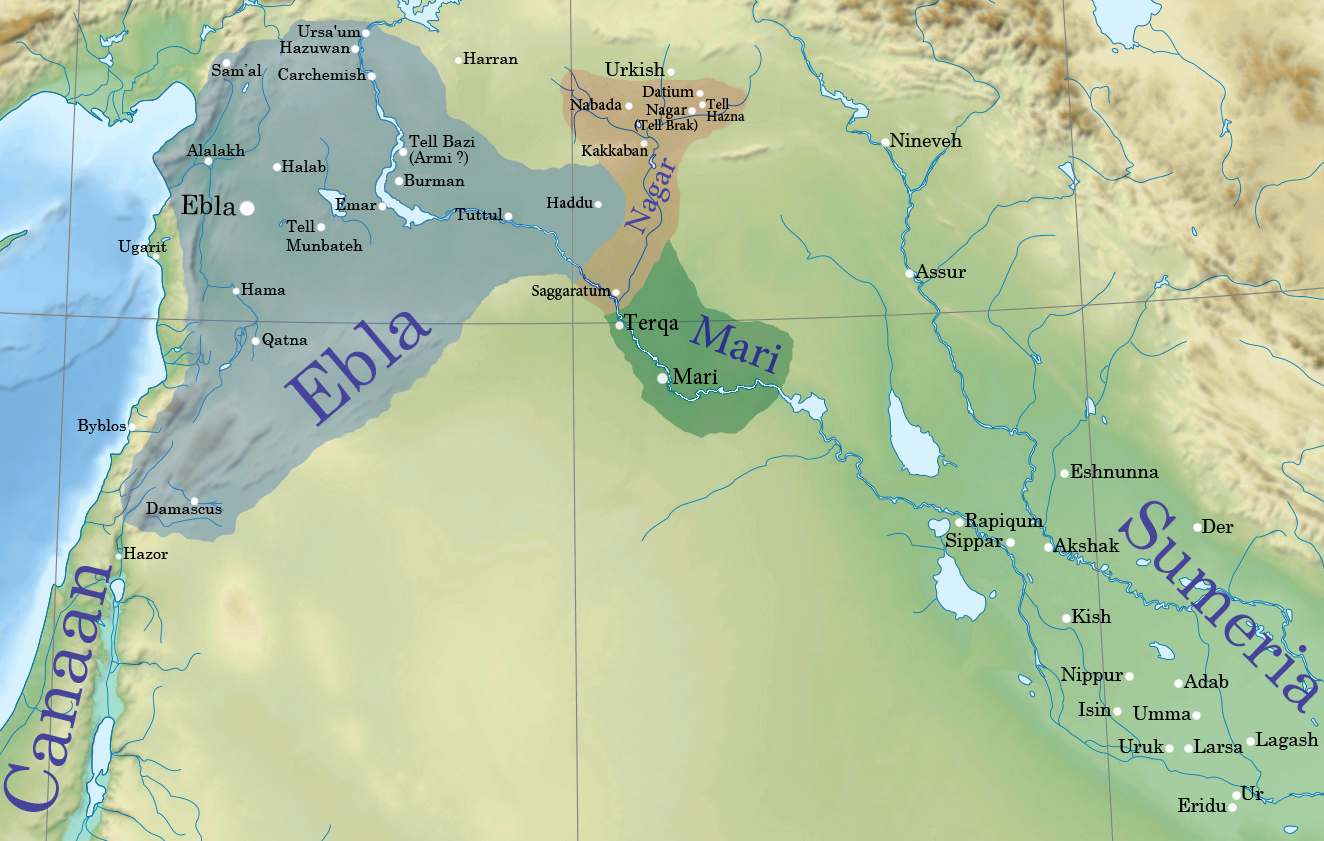
- The first kingdom at its greatest extent, including vassals
- Capital: Ebla
- Common languages: Palaeo-Syrian
- Religion: Ancient Levantine religion.
- Government: Monarchy
- Historical era: Early Bronze Age
  - Established: c. 3000 BC
  - Disestablished: c. 2300 BC
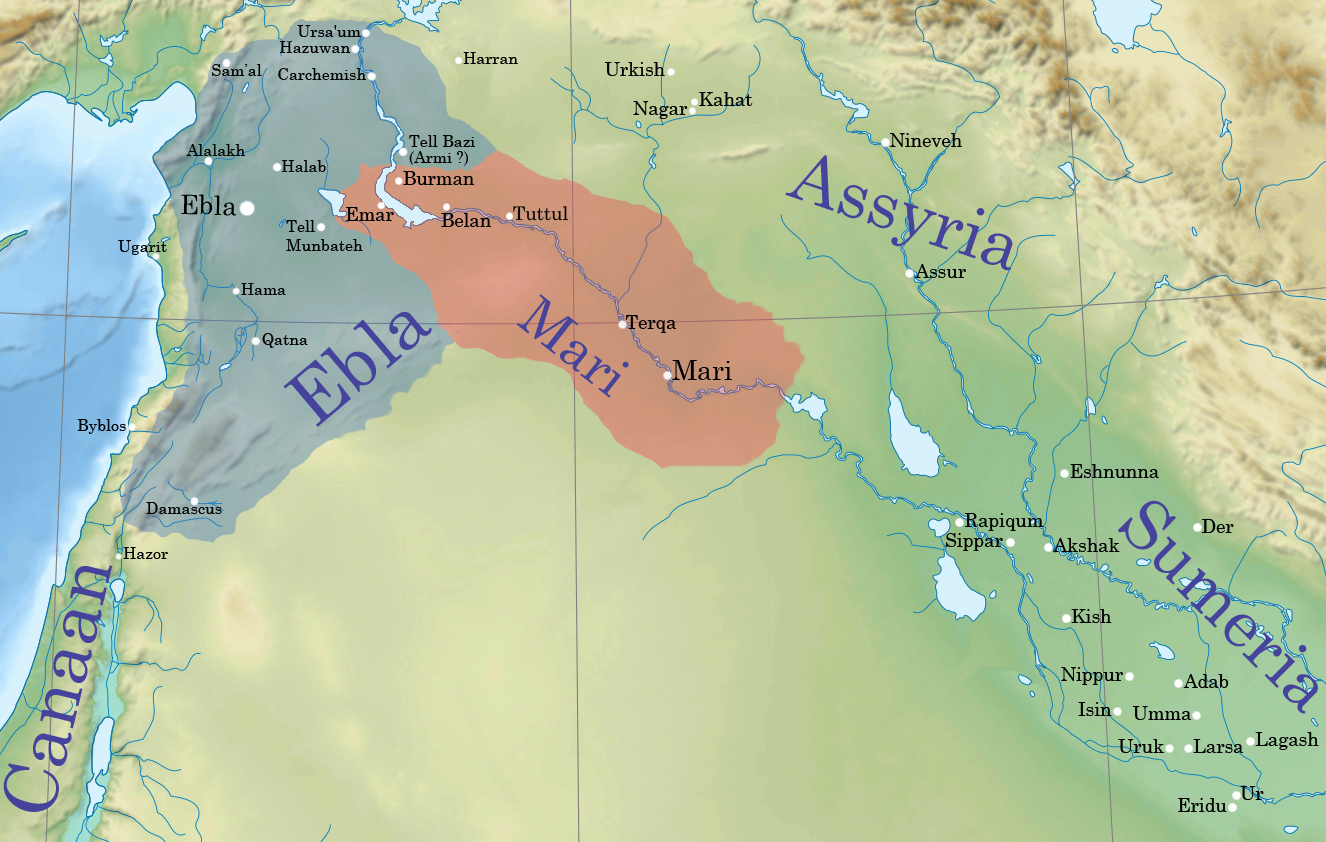
Succeeded by
The second kingdom of Mari
- Today part of: Syria; Lebanon; Turkey

Ebla was the most prominent kingdom among the Syrian states during the first kingdom period between about 3000 and 2300 BC, particularly during the second half of the 3rd millennium BC, known as "the age of the archives" after the Ebla tablets.

Mardikh IIA: The early period between 3000 and 2400 BC is designated "Mardikh IIA". General knowledge about the city's history prior to the written archives is obtained through excavations. The first stages of Mardikh IIA is identified with building "CC", and structures that form a part of building "G2", which was apparently a royal palace built c. 2700 BC. Toward the end of this period, a hundred years' war with Mari started. Mari gained the upper hand through the actions of its king Saʿumu, who conquered many of Ebla's cities. In the mid-25th century BC, king Kun-Damu defeated Mari, but the state's power declined following his reign. (Note: The political weakness started during the short reign of Adub-Damu.)

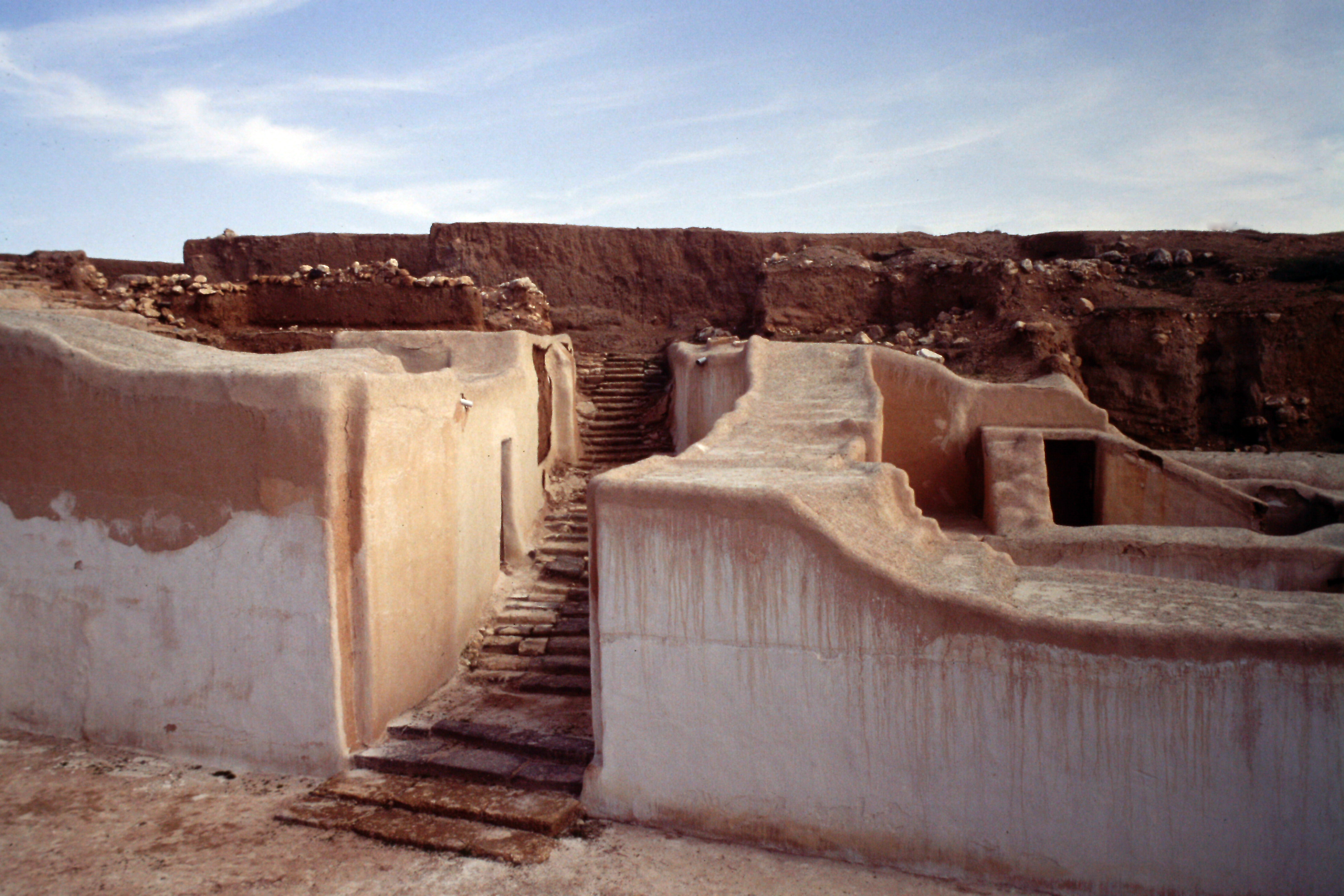
Royal palace "G"

Mardikh IIB1: The archive period, which is designated "Mardikh IIB1", lasted from c. 2400 BC until c. 2300 BC. The end of the period is known as the "first destruction", mainly referring to the destruction of the royal palace (called palace "G" and built over the earlier "G2"), and much of the acropolis. During the archive period, Ebla had political and military dominance over the other Syrian city-states of northern and eastern Syria, which are mentioned in the archives. Most of the tablets, which date from that period, are about economic matters but also include royal letters and diplomatic documents.

Ebla on the map of Ancient Orient around 2400 BCE. Conflict between Ebla and Mari.

The written archives do not date from before Igrish-Halam's reign, which saw Ebla paying tribute to Mari, and an extensive invasion of Eblaite cities in the middle Euphrates region led by the Mariote king Iblul-Il. Ebla recovered under King Irkab-Damu in about 2340 BC; becoming prosperous and launching a successful counter-offensive against Mari. Irkab-Damu concluded a peace and trading treaty with Abarsal. (Note: Probably located along the Euphrates river east of Ebla.) This Treaty between Ebla and Abarsal is one of the earliest-recorded treaties in history.

===== Geography =====
At its greatest extent, Ebla controlled an area roughly half the size of modern Syria, from Ursa'um in the north, to the area around Damascus in the south, and from Phoenicia and the coastal mountains in the west, to Haddu in the east. Large parts of the kingdom were under the direct control of the king and were administered by governors; the rest consisted of vassal kingdoms. One of the most important of these vassals was Armi, which is the city most often mentioned in the Ebla tablets. Ebla had more than sixty vassal kingdoms and city-states, including Hazuwan, Burman, Emar, Halabitu and Salbatu.

According to Archi, these are "the twelve Syrian cities long allied with Ebla that (presumably) assisted in some way during the expedition against Mari: NIrar, Ra’ak, Burman, Dub, Emar, Garmu, Lumnan, Ibubu, Ursaum, Utik, Kakmium, and Iritum (Irridu)." Furthermore, the following cities were under Ebla's hegemony at that time, and annually delivered tribute: Dub, Dulu, Harran, Ibubu, Iritum, Kablul, Sanapzugum, Ursaum, and Utik.

Modern scholars have termed the king's chief official "the vizier". The most powerful vizier was Ibrium, who campaigned against Abarsal during the term of his predecessor Arrukum. Ibrium held office for 18 years with warfare occurring in all but one year. During the reign of Isar-Damu, Ebla continued the war against Mari, which defeated Ebla's ally Nagar, blocking trade routes between Ebla and southern Mesopotamia via upper Mesopotamia. Ebla conducted regular military campaigns against rebellious vassals, including several attacks on Armi, and a campaign against the southern region of Ib'al – close to Qatna. In order to settle the war with Mari, Isar-Damu allied with Nagar and Kish. Some scholars have suggested that the Kish in question was not the Mesopotamian city but rather a town near Nagar in the Khabur area. The campaign was headed by the Eblaite vizier Ibbi-Sipish, who led the combined armies to victory in a battle near Terqa. The alliance also attacked Armi and occupied it, leaving Ibbi-Sipish's son Enzi-Malik as governor. Ebla suffered its first destruction a few years after the campaign, probably following Isar-Damu's death.

==== First destruction of Ebla ====
The first destruction occurred c. 2300 BC; palace "G" was burned, baking the clay tablets of the royal archives and preserving them. Many theories about the cause and the perpetrator have been posited:

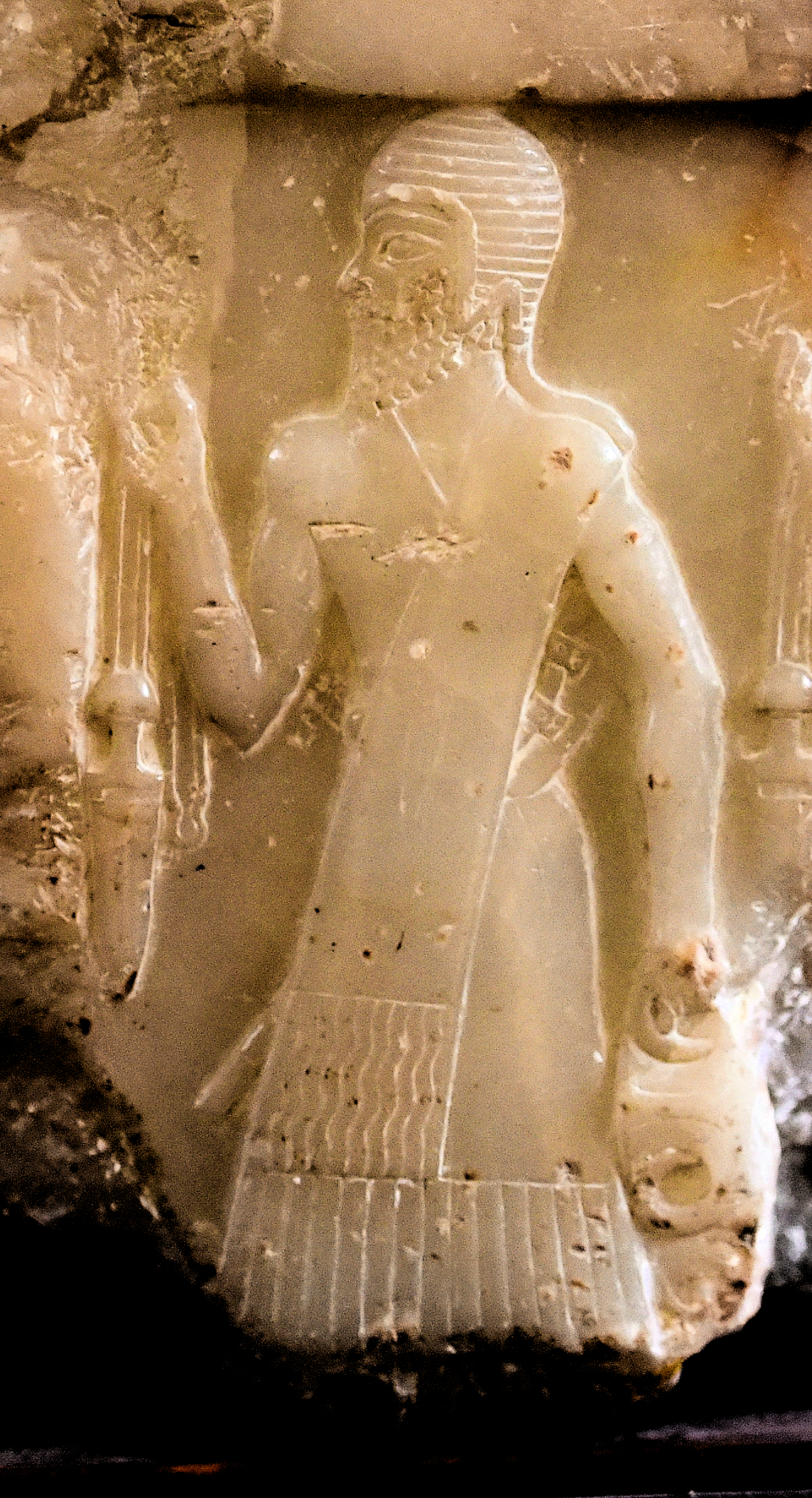
Akkadian soldier of Naram-Sin, with helmet and long sword, on the Nasiriyah stele. He carries a metal vessel of Anatolian type. From Mesopotamia, Iraq, c. 2300 BC. Iraq Museum.

- High (early) dating hypothesis: Giovanni Pettinato supports an early dating for Ebla that would put the destruction at around 2500 BC. (Note: At first Pettinato supported the Naram-Sin theory before proposing the High dating.) Pettinato, while preferring the date of 2500 BC, later accepted the event could have happened in 2400 BC. (Note: Michael Astour argues that using the chronology accepted by Pettinato, one obtains the date of 2500 BC for the reign of Ur-Nanshe of Lagash, who ruled approximately 150 years prior to Lagash's destruction at the hands of king Lugalzagesi. Since Ur-Nanshe ruled in 2500 BC, and his reign is separated by at least 150 years from Hidar of Mari's reign which saw Ebla's destruction, then the date for that event is pulled beyond 2500 BC and even 2400 BC.) The scholar suggests the city was destroyed in 2400 BC by a Mesopotamian such as Eannatum of Lagash – who boasted of taking tribute from Mari – or Lugalzagesi of Umma, who claimed to have reached the Mediterranean. (Note: Astour argue that according to the middle chronology used for the 2400 BC date, Eannatum's reign ended in 2425 BC and Ebla was not destroyed until 2400 BC; according to the same chronology Lugalzagesi's reign would have started fifty years after 2400 BC.)
- Akkadian hypothesis: Both kings Sargon of Akkad and his grandson Naram-Sin claimed to have destroyed a town called Ibla. The discoverer of Ebla, Paolo Matthiae, considers Sargon a more likely culprit; (Note: At first Matthiae supported the Naram-Sin theory then switched to Sargon.) his view is supported by Trevor Bryce, but rejected by Michael Astour. (Note: Astour believes that Sargon and his grandson were referring to a city with a similar name in modern Iraq named "Ib-la". Astour says the archives of Ebla at the time of their destruction correspond to the political situation predating the establishment of the Akkadian empire, not just the reign of Naram-Sin. It is also unlikely Sargon was responsible because at the time of their destruction, the Ebla tablets describe Kish as independent. Lugalzagesi sacked Kish and was killed by Sargon before Sargon destroyed Ibla or Ebla.) The conquest of Armanum and Ebla on the Mediterranean coast by Naram-Sin is mentioned in several of his inscriptions:

"Whereas, for all time since the creation of mankind, no king whosoever had destroyed Armanum and Ebla, the god Nergal, by means of (his) weapons opened the way for Naram-Sin, the mighty, and gave him Armanum and Ebla. Further, he gave to him the Amanus, the Cedar Mountain, and the Upper Sea. By means of the weapons of the god Dagan, who magnifies his kingship, Naram-Sin, the mighty, conquered Armanum and Ebla."

— Inscription of Naram-Sin. E 2.1.4.26

- Mari's revenge: According to Alfonso Archi and Maria Biga, the destruction happened approximately three or four years after the battle at Terqa. Archi and Biga say the destruction was caused by Mari in retaliation for its humiliating defeat at Terqa. This view is supported by Mario Liverani. Archi says the Mariote king Isqi-Mari destroyed Ebla before ascending the throne of his city.
- Natural catastrophe: Astour says a natural catastrophe caused the blaze which ended the archive period. He says the destruction was limited to the area of the royal palace and there is no convincing evidence of looting. He dates the fire to c. 2290 BC (Middle Chronology).

==== Second kingdom ====
Second Eblaite Kingdom Ebla
- c. 2300 BC–c. 2000 BC
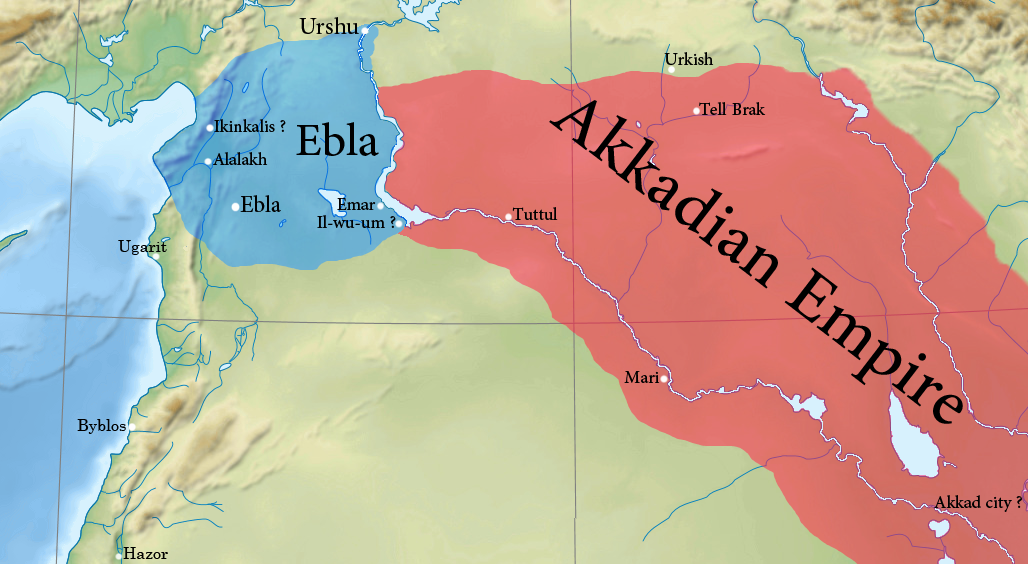
- Approximate borders of the second kingdom
- Capital: Ebla
- Common languages: Palaeo-Syrian
- Government: Monarchy
- Historical era: Bronze Age
  - Established: c. 2300 BC
  - Disestablished: c. 2000 BC

The second kingdom's period is designated "Mardikh IIB2", and spans the period between 2300 and 2000 BC. The second kingdom lasted until Ebla's second destruction, which occurred anytime between 2050 and 1950 BC, with the 2000 BC dating being a mere formal date. The Akkadians under Sargon of Akkad and his descendant Naram-Sin invaded the northern borders of Ebla aiming for the forests of the Amanus Mountain; the intrusions were separated by roughly 90 years and the areas attacked were not attached to Akkad. Archi accept that the Ibla mentioned in the annals of Sargon and Naram-Sin is the Syrian Ebla but do not consider them responsible for the destruction which ended the Archive period. By the time of Naram-Sin, Armi was the hegemonic city in northern Syria and was destroyed by the Akkadian king.

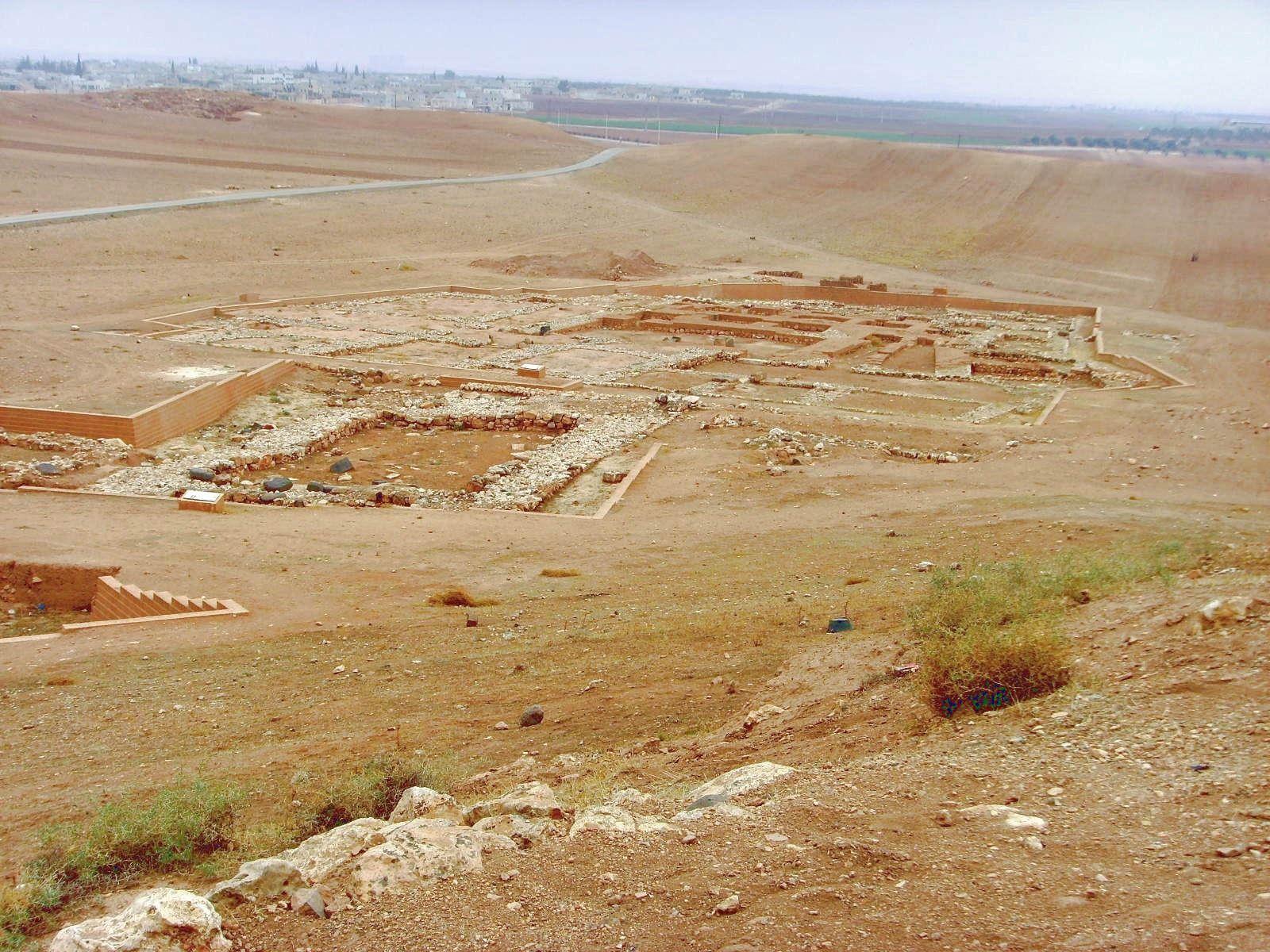
Palace "P5"

A new local dynasty ruled the second kingdom of Ebla, but there was continuity with its first kingdom heritage. Ebla maintained its earliest features, including its architectural style and the sanctity of the first kingdom's religious sites. A new royal palace was built in the lower town, and the transition from the archive period is marked only by the destruction of palace "G". Little is known about the second kingdom because no written material have been discovered aside from one inscription dating to the end of the period.

The second kingdom was attested in contemporaneous sources; in an inscription, Gudea of Lagash asked for cedars to be brought from Urshu in the mountains of Ebla, indicating Ebla's territory included Urshu north of Carchemish in modern-day Turkey. Texts that dates to the seventh year of Amar-Sin (c. 2040 BC), (Note: Amar-Sin's reign lasted from 2045 to 2037 BC (middle chronology).) a ruler of the Ur III empire, mention a messenger of the Ensí ("Megum") of Ebla. (Note: "Megum" is thought to have been a title of the ruler of Ebla rather than a personal name; King Ibbit-Lim of the latter third kingdom of Ebla also used this title. An Eblaite seal that reads "Ib-Damu Mekim Ebla", was used in the 19th century BC by an Assyrian merchant named Assur-Nada from Kültepe. Ib Damu was the name of an Eblaite king from the early period of the first kingdom.) (Note: In a tablet, the name of Ili-Dagan "the man of Ebla" is mentioned, and he was thought to be a ruler. However, other texts refer to him as the envoy of Ebla's ruler.) The second kingdom was considered a vassal by the Ur III government, but the nature of the relation is unknown and it included the payment of tribute. A formal recognition of Ur's overlordship appears to be a condition for the right of trade with that empire.

The second kingdom disintegrated toward the end of the 21st century BC, and ended with the destruction of the city by fire, although evidence for the event has only been found outside of the so-called "Temple of the Rock", and in the area around palace "E" on the acropolis. Conflict may have preceded the fire; according to Astour, it could have been the result of a Hurrian invasion c. 2030 BC, led by the former Eblaite vassal city of Ikinkalis. (Note: Unidentified location to the north of Ebla in the proximity of Alalakh.) The destruction of Ebla is mentioned in the fragmentary Hurro-Hittite legendary epic "Song of Release" discovered in 1983, which Astour considers as describing the destruction of the second kingdom. In the epic, an Eblaite assembly led by a man called "Zazalla" prevents king Meki from showing mercy to prisoners from Ebla's former vassal Ikinkalis, provoking the wrath of the Hurrian storm god Teshub and causing him to destroy the city.

=== Middle Bronze ===
==== Third kingdom ====
Third Eblaite Kingdom Ebla
- c. 2000 BC–c. 1600 BC
- Capital: Ebla
- Common languages: Amorite language.
- Religion: Ancient Levantine religion
- Government: Monarchy
- Historical era: Bronze Age
  - Established: c. 2000 BC
  - Disestablished: c. 1600 BC
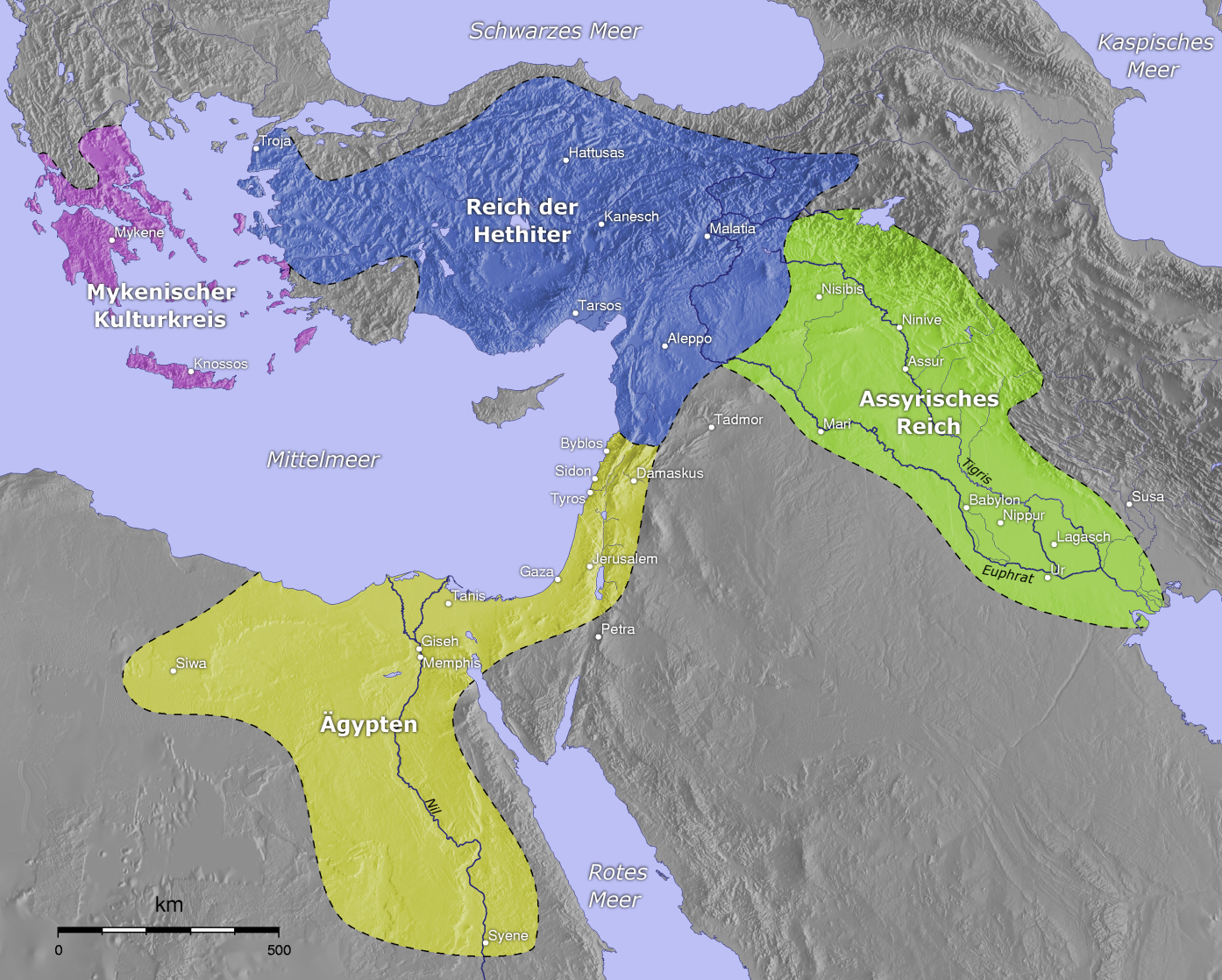
Succeeded by
Hittites

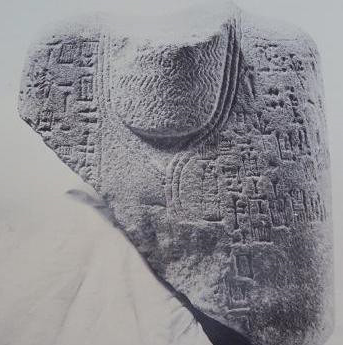
Statue fragment of Ibbit-Lim.

In the Middle Bronze Age, a third kingdom is designated "Mardikh III"; it is divided into periods "A" (c. 2000–1800 BC) and "B" (c. 1800–1600 BC). In period "A", Ebla was quickly rebuilt as a planned city. The foundations covered the remains of Mardikh II; new palaces and temples were built, and new fortifications were built in two circles – one for the low city and one for the acropolis. The city was laid out on regular lines and large public buildings were built. Further construction took place in period "B".

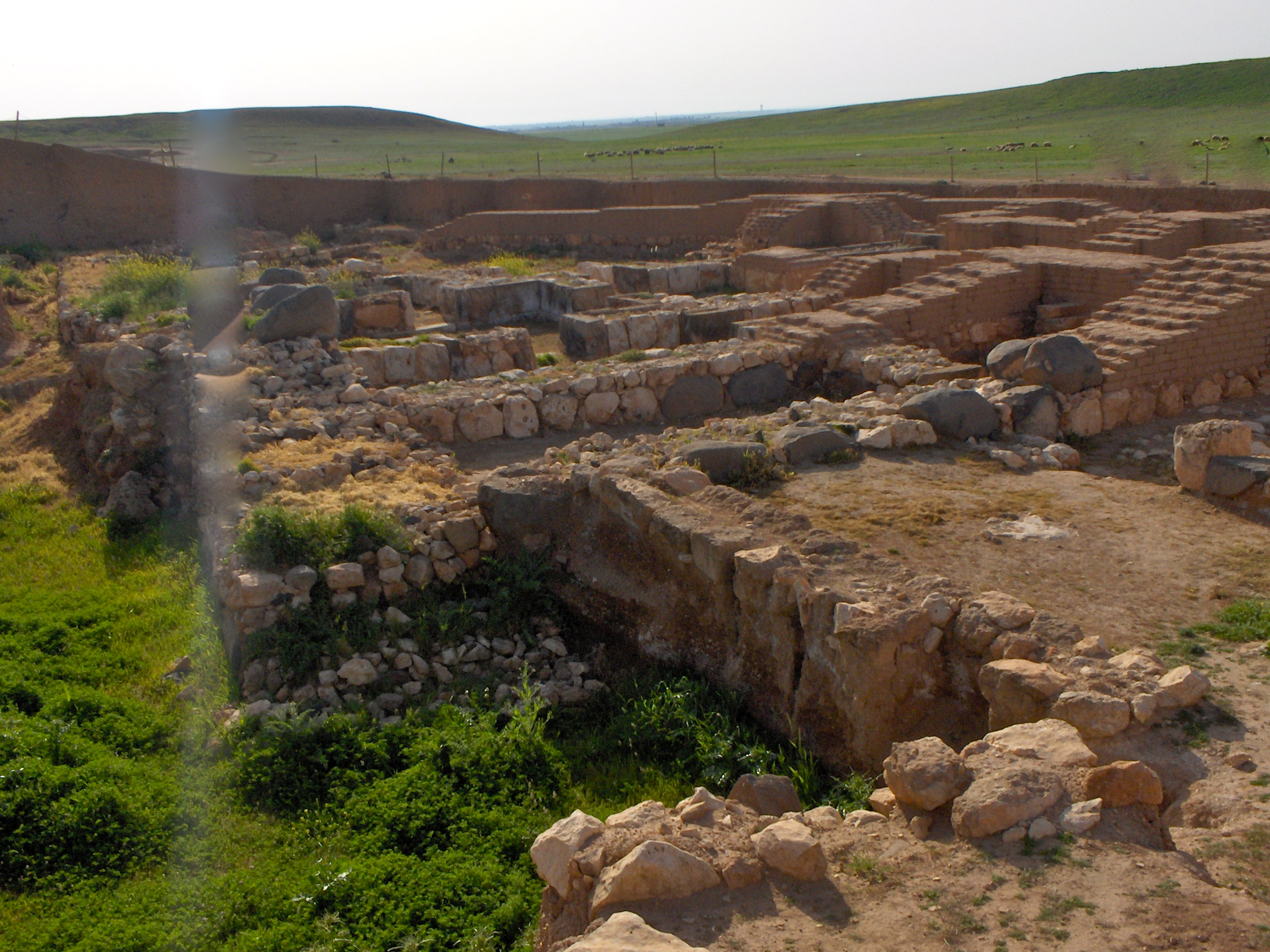
The vizier palace

==== Middle Bronze I - Mardikh IIIA ====
The first known king of the third kingdom is Ibbit-Lim, who described himself as the Mekim of Ebla. (Note: This led Astour, David I. Owen and Ron Veenker to identify Ibbit-Lim with the pre-Amorite Megum of the Third Ur era. However, this identification is now refuted.) A basalt votive statue bearing Ibbit-Lim's inscription was discovered in 1968; this helped to identify the site of Tell-Mardikh with the ancient kingdom Ebla. The name of the king is Amorite in the view of Pettinato; it is therefore probable the inhabitants of third kingdom Ebla were predominantly Amorites, as were most of the inhabitants of Syria at that time.

- Meki (king) of Ebla Ibbit-Lim, son of Igrish-Kheb

==== Middle Bronze II - Mardikh IIIB ====
During Middle Bronze IIA (MB IIA), Ebla Mardikh IIIB1 became a vassal of Yamhad, an Amorite kingdom centered in Aleppo.

Written records are not available for this period, but the city was still a vassal during Yarim-Lim III of Yamhad's reign. One of the known rulers of Ebla during this period was Immeya, who received gifts from the Egyptian Pharaoh Hotepibre, indicating the continuing wide connections and importance of Ebla. The city was mentioned in tablets from the Yamhadite vassal city of Alalakh in modern-day Turkey; an Eblaite princess married a son of King Ammitaqum of Alalakh, who belonged to a branch of the royal Yamhadite dynasty.

In Middle Bronze IIB (MB IIB), the Great Kingdom of Yamhad under which Ebla Mardikh IIIB2 was a vassal declined due to climate change and raiding attacks by the Hittites (Hattusili I and Mursili I). Ebla was destroyed by the Hittite King Mursili I in about 1600 BC. Indilimma was probably the last king of Ebla; a seal of his crown prince Maratewari was discovered in the western palace "Q". Alternatively, Maratewari could well be the last king according to Archi, who also argued that the "Song of Release" epic describes the destruction of the third kingdom and preserves older elements.

=== Late Bronze Age ===
Ebla never recovered from its third destruction. It was a small village in the phase designated "Mardikh IV" (1600–1200 BC). It was mentioned in the records of Alalakh as a vassal to the Idrimi dynasty.

=== Iron Age and later ===
"Mardikh V" (1200–535 BC) was a rural, Early Iron Age settlement that grew in size during later periods. Further development occurred during "Mardikh VI", which lasted until c. 60 AD. "Mardikh VII" began in the 3rd century AD and lasted until the 7th century, after which the site was abandoned.

== Site ==
=== Layout ===
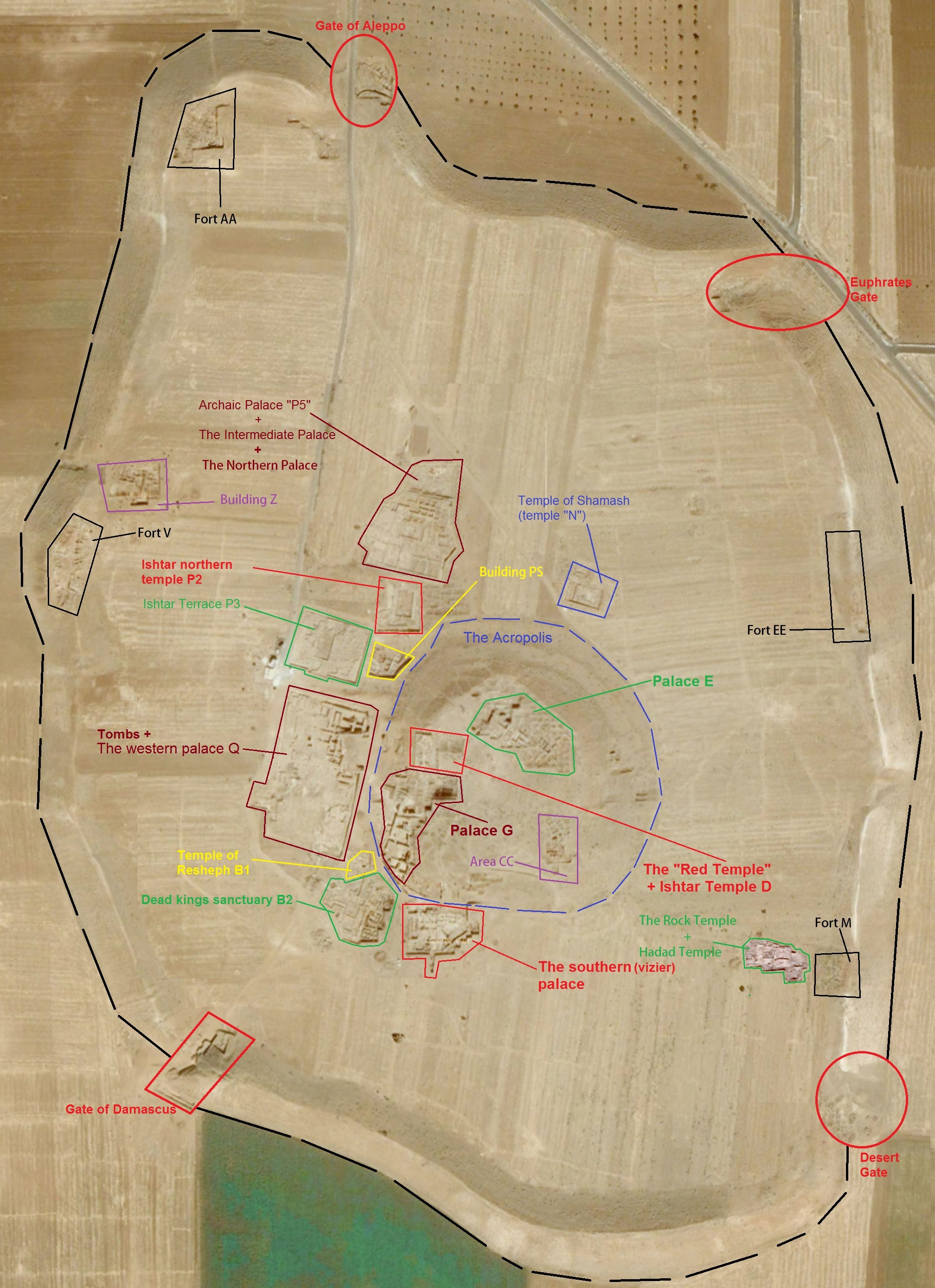
Ebla's landmarks

Ebla consisted of a lower town and a raised acropolis in the center. During the first kingdom, the city had an area of 56 hectares and was protected by mud-brick fortifications. Ebla was divided into four districts – each with its own gate in the outer wall. The acropolis included the king's palace "G", and one of two temples in city dedicated to Kura (called the "Red Temple"). The lower city included the second temple of Kura in the southeast called "Temple of the Rock". During the second kingdom, a royal palace (Archaic palace "P5") was built in the lower town northwest of the acropolis, in addition to temple "D" built over the destroyed "Red Temple".

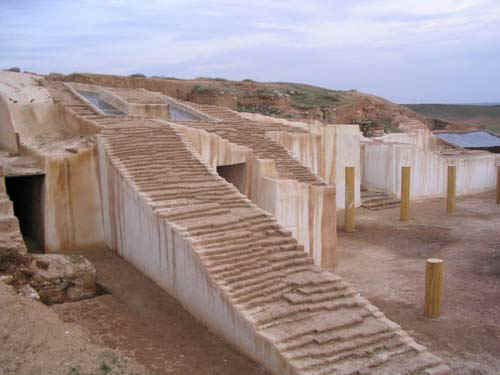
Royal Palace of Ebla (G sector)

During the third kingdom, Ebla was a large city nearly 60 hectares in size, and was protected by a fortified rampart, with double chambered gates. The acropolis was fortified and separated from the lower town. New royal palace "E" was built on the acropolis (during Mardikh IIIB), and a temple of Ishtar was constructed over the former "Red" and "D" temples (in area "D"). The lower town was also divided into four districts; palace "P5" was used during Mardikh IIIA, and replaced during Mardikh IIIB by the "Intermediate Palace".

Other third kingdom buildings included the vizier palace, (Note: Called the southern palace (in area "FF"), it was located at the foot of the southern side of the acropolis.) the western palace (in area "Q"), the temple of Shamash (temple "N"), the temple of Rasap (temple "B1") and the northern palace (built over the "Intermediate Palace"). In the north of the lower town, a second temple for Ishtar was built, while the former "Temple of the Rock" was replaced by a temple of Hadad. (Note: Area HH.)

=== Royal burials ===
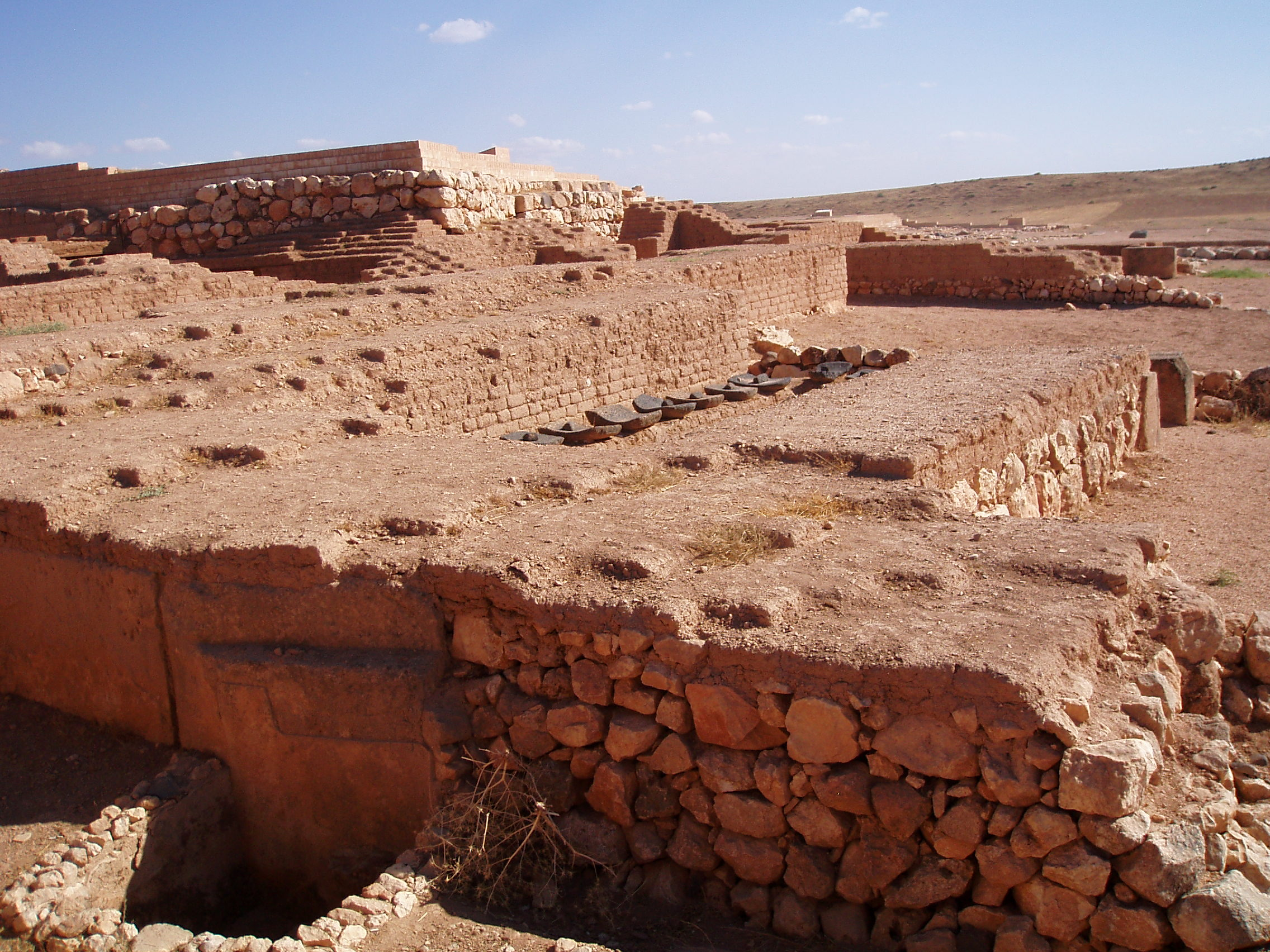
The western palace "Q" situated above the royal necropolis

The kings of the first kingdom were buried outside the city; the last ten kings (ending with Irkab-Damu) were buried in Darib, while older kings were buried in a royal mausoleum located in Binas and only one royal tomb dating to the first kingdom was discovered in Ebla (Hypogeum "G4"). This first kingdom tomb was probably built during the reign of the last king and might be an indication of Eblaite adoption of Mesopotamian traditions to bury the kings beneath their royal palaces.

The third kingdom royal necropolis was discovered beneath palace "Q" (the western palace); it contains many hypogea but only three were excavated. Those tombs were natural caves in the bedrock of the palace's foundation; they all date to the 19th and 18th centuries BC and had a similar plan consisting of an entrance shaft, burial chambers and a dromos, or entryway, connecting the shaft to the chamber.

==== Hypogeum G4 ====
The tomb found in the royal palace "G" is designated hypogeum "G4"; it dates to the archive period, most probably the reign of Isar-Damu. The tomb is heavily damaged; most of its stones were sacked and nothing of the roof system remains. It also lacks any skeletal remains or funerary goods suggesting that it was either heavily pillaged, never used, or was built as a cenotaph.

Excavated between 1992 and 1995, it is located underneath the western sector of the palace at a depth of almost 6 meters. The tomb is composed of two rooms opened on each other's with lime plaster floors. Both rooms are rectangular in shape; the eastern room (L.6402) is 4 meters wide, more than 3,5 meters long (total length is unknown due to heavy damage) and west–east oriented. The western room (L.5762) is 5.20 meters long, 4 meters wide and west–east oriented. Limestone was used to build the walls and few blocks protruding from the sides toward the middle of the rooms suggest the roof to have been a corbelled vault.

==== Western palace tombs ====
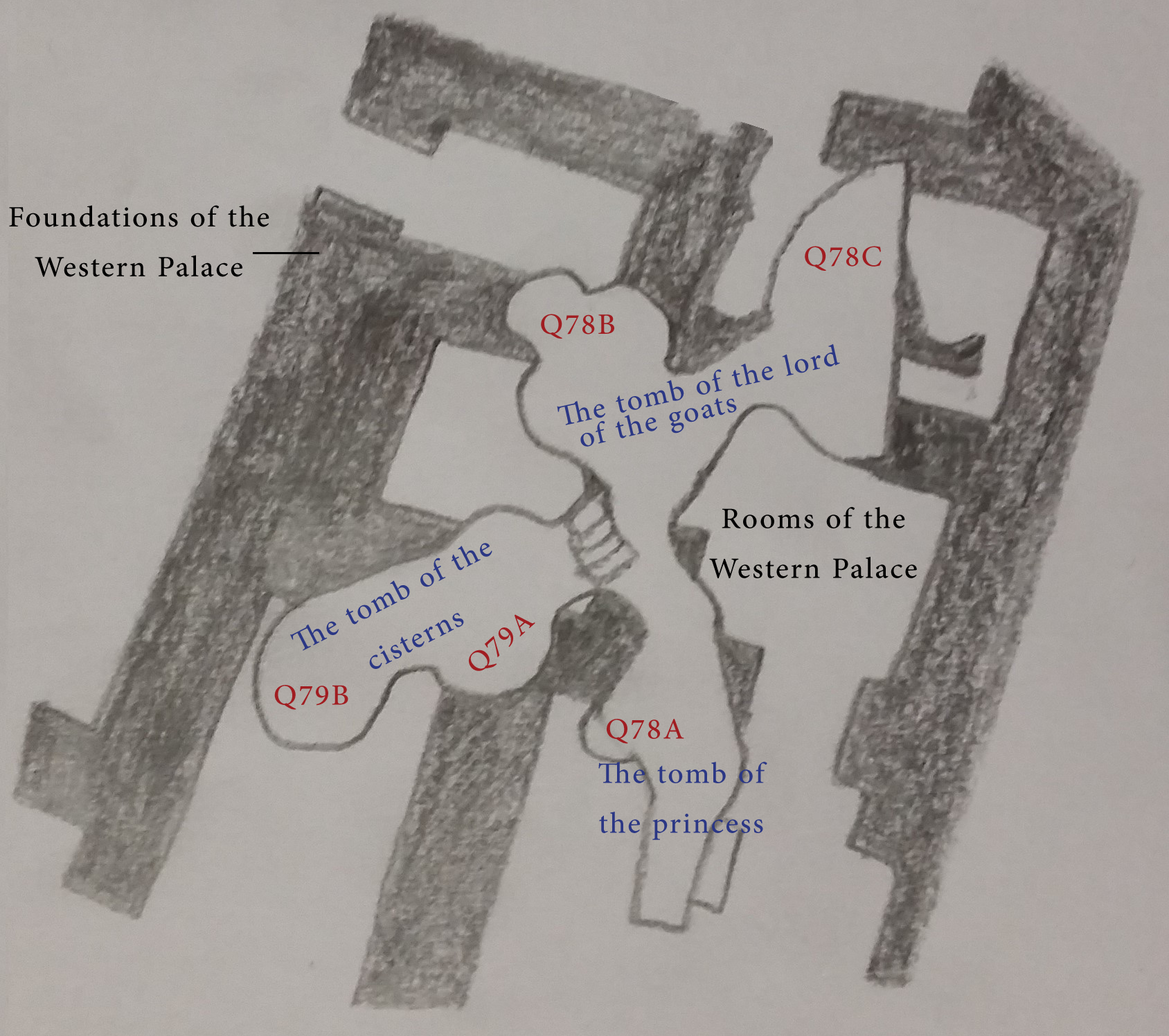
Plan of the western palace tombs

The tombs were found under the floor of Building Q, which was built in the Isin-Larsa period.

- The tomb of the princess: dating to c. 1800 BC, it is the oldest and smallest of the third kingdom tombs found. Excavated in 1978, it contained the remains of a young woman. The dromos is an enlargement of a natural cave with steps partially cut in the bedrock and partially paved with stones. The tomb is the only one not pillaged; it contained precious jewels and funerary objects.
- The tomb of the cisterns: this tomb is the most damaged in the necropolis. It consists of a double room burial; the earliest, (Q79A), was built at the same period of the tomb of the princess, and was badly damaged when the tomb was reused, and a dromos was built in the place of Q79A toward the end of the 17th century BC (leading to the founding of burial Q79B). This was probably the resting place of a king; a club (a symbol of royal power) was discovered in Q79A.
- The tomb of the lord of the goats: the largest in the necropolis, it includes two depositional chambers and is reached through a vertical shaft. The recovered body is not identified; archaeologists call it "the Lord of the Goats" after one of the grave goods, a throne decorated with bronze goat heads. It could be king Immeya; a silver cup inscribed with his name was among the grave goods.

== Government ==
The first kingdom's government consisted of the king (styled Malikum) and the grand vizier, who headed a council of elders (Abbu) and the administration. The second kingdom was also a monarchy, but little is known about it because of a lack of written records. The third kingdom was a city-state monarchy with reduced importance under the authority of Yamhad.

=== Administration of the first kingdom ===
The queen shared the running of affairs of state with the king. The crown prince was involved in internal matters and the second prince was involved in foreign affairs. Most duties, including military ones, were handled by the vizier and the administration, which consisted of 13 court dignitaries – each of whom controlled between 400 and 800 men forming a bureaucracy with 11,700 people. Each of the four quarters of the lower city was governed by a chief inspector and many deputies. To oversee royal interest, the king employed agents (mashkim), collectors (ur) and messengers (kas).

==== Administrative divisions ====
Many client kingdoms owed allegiance to Ebla and each was ruled by its own king (En); those vassal kings were highly autonomous, paying tribute and supplying military assistance to Ebla. The administrative center in the capital was named the "SA.ZA"; it included the royal palaces, storerooms and some temples. Regions beyond the walls of the capital were collectively named in Eblaite texts "uru-bar" (literally meaning outside of the city). The villages and towns under the central authority were either ruled directly from the capital, or had appointed officials. The titles of the civil servants do not clearly define the bearer's responsibilities and authority as each town had its own political traditions.

- Lugal: while in Mesopotamia a lugal designated a king, in Ebla it designated a governor who was directly under the authority of the capital. The nature of this title as part of Eblaite bureaucracy is ambiguous; each lugal was under the authority of the grand vizier, and the bearers ruled cities directly under the authority of the capital and they all brought goods to be kept in Ebla's storehouses. Pettinato counted 14 different lugals in the Eblaite administrative texts and deduced that the kingdom was divided into fourteen departments; two of them in the capital itself and the remaining twelve spanned the rest of the kingdom.
- Ugula: the title is translated as superintendent; some ugulas were independent rulers and some represented the highest authority of a tribal group. Many cities had an appointed ugula as their head of administration such as the city of Darum.

==== Chora ====
The regions under the direct control of the king that were economically vital for the capital are called the "chora" by archaeologists. Regions under direct control of the king extended beyond the chora and it is difficult to determine the exact size of the kingdom and the chora due to the constant military expansion of Ebla which added new territories; some of those were ruled directly while others were allowed to retain their own rulers as vassals.

Generally, the chora is the core region of Ebla that includes the economic hinterland supporting the capital. It includes the cities and villages where the king or his vizier had palaces, towns that included important sanctuaries of gods related to the royal institution, towns visited by the monarch during the different rituals he participated in (such as the renewal of royalty ritual), (Note: The ritual had the king and the queen visiting Ninas, and making offerings to royal ancestors.) and other cities such as the ones where textiles were delivered. The chora spans around 3000 km^{2}; from west to east it includes the plains east of Jabal Zawiya, the Maṭkh swamp, al-Hass mountain and mount Shabīth. Areas directly on the borders of the chora such as al-Ghab, al-Rouge plain and al-Jabbul have close cultural affinity with the chora.

== People, language, and culture ==
=== The first and second kingdoms ===
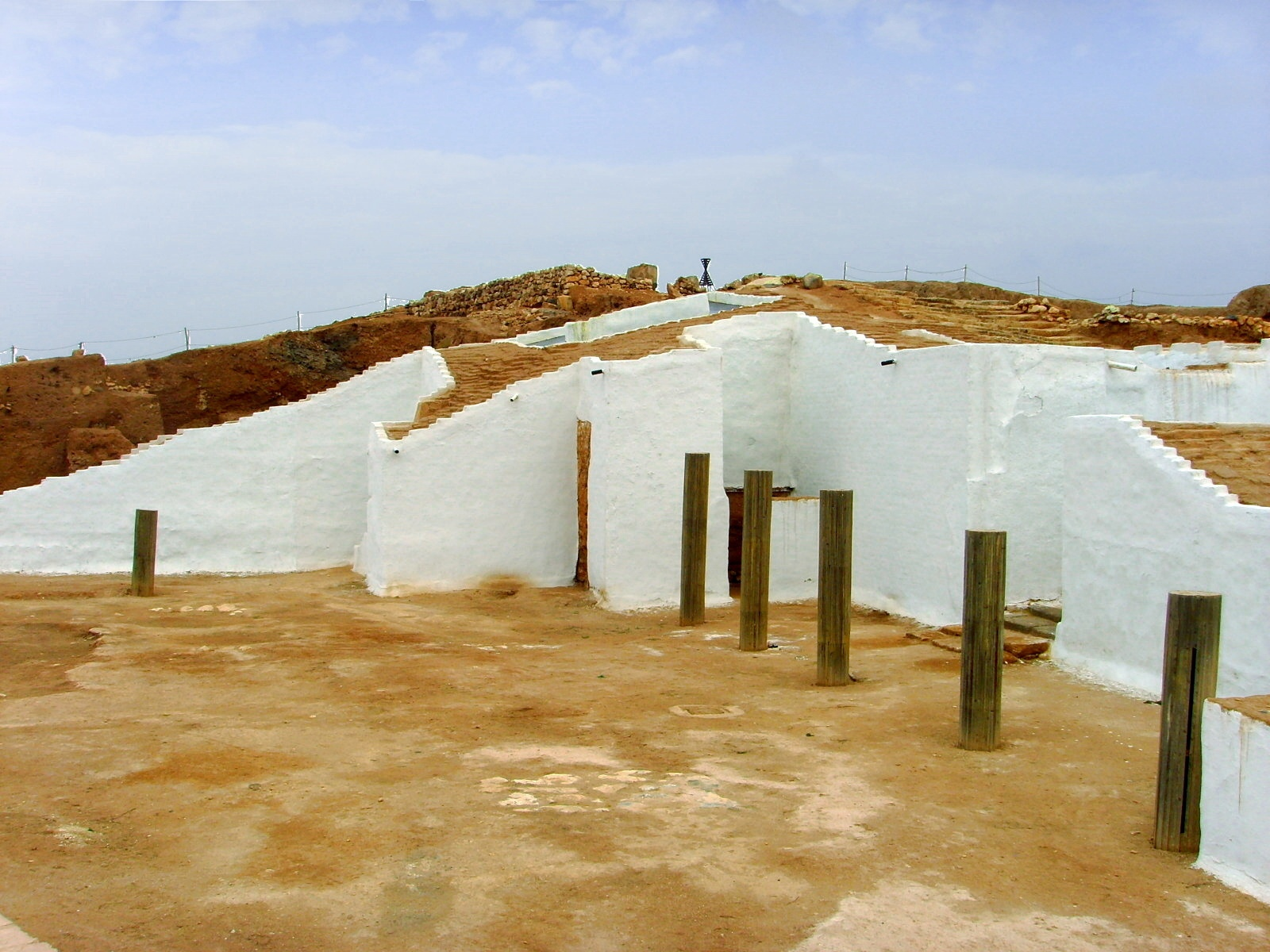
Royal palace "G" courtyard

Mardikh II's periods shared the same culture. the population of Ebla during Mardikh IIB1 (2400–2300 BC) is estimated to have numbered around 40,000 in the capital, and over 200,000 people in the entire kingdom. The Eblaites of Mardikh II were Semite-speakers close to their Northwestern Semitic neighbors, such as the Amorites. Giovanni Pettinato said the Eblaite language, one of the oldest attested Semitic languages, was a West Semitic language; Gelb and others said it was an East Semitic dialect closer to the Akkadian language. Academic consensus considers Eblaite an East Semitic language which exhibits both West and East Semitic features. (Note: Grammatically, Eblaite is closer to Akkadian, but lexically and in some grammatical forms, Eblaite is closer to West Semitic languages.)

Ebla held several religious and social festivals, including rituals for the succession of a new king, which normally lasted for several weeks. The Eblaite calendars were based on a solar year divided into twelve months. Two calendars were discovered; the "old calendar" used during the reign of Igrish-Halam, and a "new calendar" introduced by vizier Ibbi-Sipish. Many months were named in honor of deities; in the new calendar, "Itu be-li" was the first month of the year, and meant "the month of the lord". Each year was given a name instead of a number.

Women received salaries equal to those of men and could accede to important positions and head government agencies. The Eblaites imported Kungas from Nagar, (Note: The Kunga is a hybrid of a donkey and a female onager, which Nagar was famous for breeding.) and used them to draw the carriages of royalty and high officials, as well as diplomatic gifts for allied cities. Society was less centered around the palace and the temple than in Mesopotamian kingdoms. The Eblaite palace was designed around the courtyard, which was open toward the city, thus making the administration approachable. This contrasts with Mesopotamian palaces, which resembled citadels with narrow entrances and limited access to the external courtyard. Music played an important part in the society and musicians were both locals, or hired from other cities such as Mari. Ebla also hired acrobats from Nagar, but later reduced their number and kept some to train local Eblaite acrobats.

=== The third kingdom ===
The Mardikh III population was predominately Semitic Amorite. The Amorites were mentioned in the first kingdom's tablets as neighbors and as rural subjects, and they came to dominate Ebla after the destruction of the second kingdom. The city witnessed a great increase in construction, and many palaces, temples and fortifications were built. The Amorite-speaking Eblaites worshiped many of the same deities as the Paleo-Syrian-speaking Eblaites of earlier periods, and maintained the sanctity of the acropolis in the center of the city. The third kingdom's iconography and royal ideology were under the influence of Yamhad's culture; kingship was received from the Yamhadite deities instead of Ishtar of Ebla, which is evident by the Eblaite seals of Indilimma's period.

=== Genetics ===
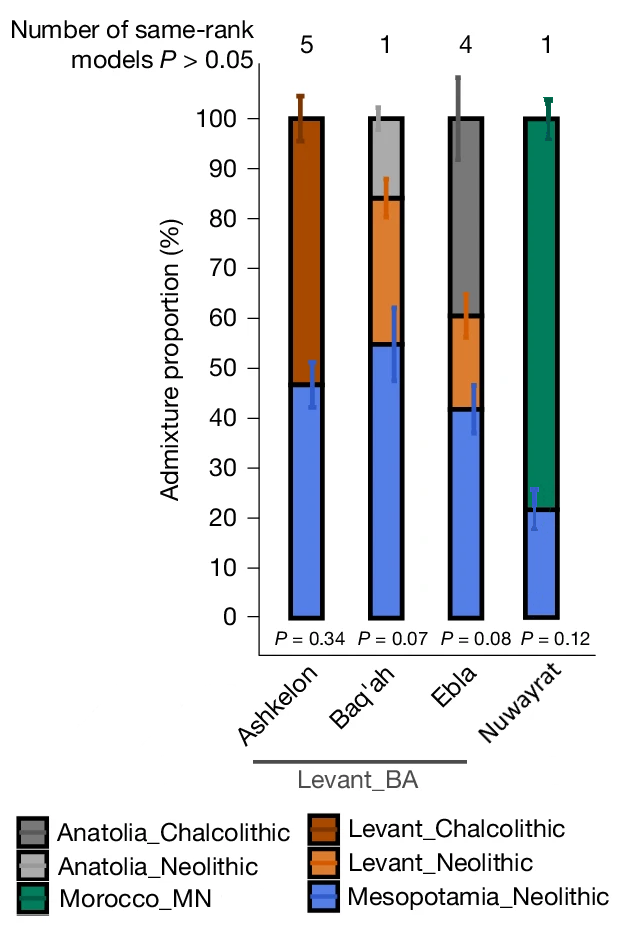
Ancestry proportions of Ebla, Ashkelon, Baq'ah and Nuwayrat Bronze Age samples for the best-fit full model (qpAdm).

Ancient DNA analysis on 10 human remains dating to the Early and Middle Bronze Age from Ebla found that Eblaites were a mixture of Copper age Levantines and Mesopotamians, and were genetically similar to contemporaneous Levantines.

One Early Bronze Age (2700-2500 BC) individual carried haplogroup E1b1b1b2a-M123, a lineage likely linked to the diffusion of Afroasiatic languages. Another Early Bronze Age (2572-2470 cal BCE) individual belonged to J1a2a1a2-P58, while four Middle Bronze Age (2000-1800 BC) individuals carried haplogroups J1a2a1a2-P58 (x2), G2a and the West Asian T1a1-L162 which was present since the middle Pre-Pottery Neolithic B (PPNB) Levant.

== Economy ==
During the first kingdom period, the palace controlled the economy, but wealthy families managed their financial affairs without government intervention. The economic system was redistributive; the palace distributed food to its permanent and seasonal workers. It is estimated that around 40,000 persons contributed to this system, but in general, and unlike in Mesopotamia, land stayed in the hands of villages, which paid an annual share to the palace. Agriculture was mainly pastoral; large herds of cattle were managed by the palace. The city's inhabitants owned around 140,000 head of sheep and goats, and 9,000 cattle.

Ebla derived its prosperity from trade; its wealth was equal to that of the most important Sumerian cities, and its main commercial rival was Mari. Ebla's main articles of trade were probably timber from the nearby mountains, and textiles. Handicrafts also appear to have been a major export, evidenced by the quantity of artifacts recovered from the palaces of the city. Ebla possessed a wide commercial network reaching as far as modern-day Afghanistan. It shipped textiles to Cyprus, possibly through the port of Ugarit, but most of its trade seems to have been directed by river-boat towards Mesopotamia – chiefly Kish. The main palace G was found to contain artifacts dating from Ancient Egypt bearing the names of the pharaohs Khafre and Pepi I.

Ebla continued to be a center of trade during the second kingdom, evidenced by the surrounding cities that appeared during its period and were destroyed along with the city. (Note: Archaeologist Alessandro de Maigret deduced that Ebla retained its trading position.) Trade continued to be Ebla's main economic activity during the third kingdom; archaeological finds show there was an extensive exchange with Egypt and coastal Syrian cities such as Byblos.

== Religion ==
Ebla was a polytheistic state. During the first kingdom, Eblaites worshiped their dead kings. The pantheon of the first Ebla included pairs of deities which are classified into three types: couples (the most common type) such as a male deity and his female consort; divine twosomes such as the deities that cooperate to create the cosmos in the Egyptian and Mesopotamian pantheons;and "divine pairs" who were actually a single deity with two names. Eblaites worshiped few Mesopotamian deities, preferring North-Western Semitic gods, some of which were unique to Ebla. The first pair-type, couples, included Hadabal (^{d}NI-da-KUL), who was exclusive to Ebla, and his consort, Belatu ("his wife"); Rasap and his consort Adamma; the patron gods of the city Kura, who was unique to Ebla, and his consort Barama. Among the divine pairs were artisan god Kamish/Tit, Kothar-wa-Khasis and the planet Venus represented by twin mountain gods; Shahar as the morning star and Shalim as the evening star.

The first Eblaites worshiped many other deities, such as the Syrian goddess Ishara, (Note: At the beginning of Ebla's studies, it was believed that the existence of Ishara and another god Ashtapi in Ebla's pantheon, is a proof for a Hurrian existence in the Eblaite first kingdom. However it is now known that those deities were pre-Hurrian and perhaps pre-Semitic deities, later incorporated into the Hurrian pantheon.) who was the goddess of the royal family. Ishtar was also worshiped but was mentioned only five times in one of the monthly offering lists, while Ishara was far more important, appearing 40 times. Other deities included Damu; (Note: Probably an old Semitic deity and not identical to the Sumerian Damu.) the Mesopotamian god Utu; Ashtapi; Dagan; Hadad (Hadda) and his consort Halabatu ("she of Halab"); and Shipish, the goddess of the sun who had a temple dedicated to her cult. The four city gates were named after the gods Dagan, Hadda, Rasap and Utu, but it is unknown which gate had which name. Overall, the offering list mentioned about 40 deities receiving sacrifices.

During the third kingdom, Amorites worshiped common northern Semitic gods; the unique Eblaite deities disappeared. Hadad was the most important god, while Ishtar took Ishara's place and became the city's most important deity apart from Hadad.

=== Biblical connection theories ===
At the beginning of the process of deciphering the tablets, Giovanni Pettinato made claims about possible connections between Ebla and the Bible, citing alleged references in the tablets to the existence of Yahweh, the Patriarchs, Sodom and Gomorrah and other Biblical references. However, much of the initial media excitement about a supposed Eblaite connections with the Bible, based on preliminary guesses and speculations by Pettinato and others, is now widely discredited and the academic consensus is that Ebla "has no bearing on the Minor Prophets, the historical accuracy of the Biblical Patriarchs, Yahweh worship, or Sodom and Gomorrah". In Ebla studies, the focus has shifted away from comparisons with the Bible; Ebla is now studied as a civilization in its own right. The claims led to a bitter personal and academic conflict between the scholars involved, as well as what some described as political interference by the Syrian authorities.

== Excavations ==
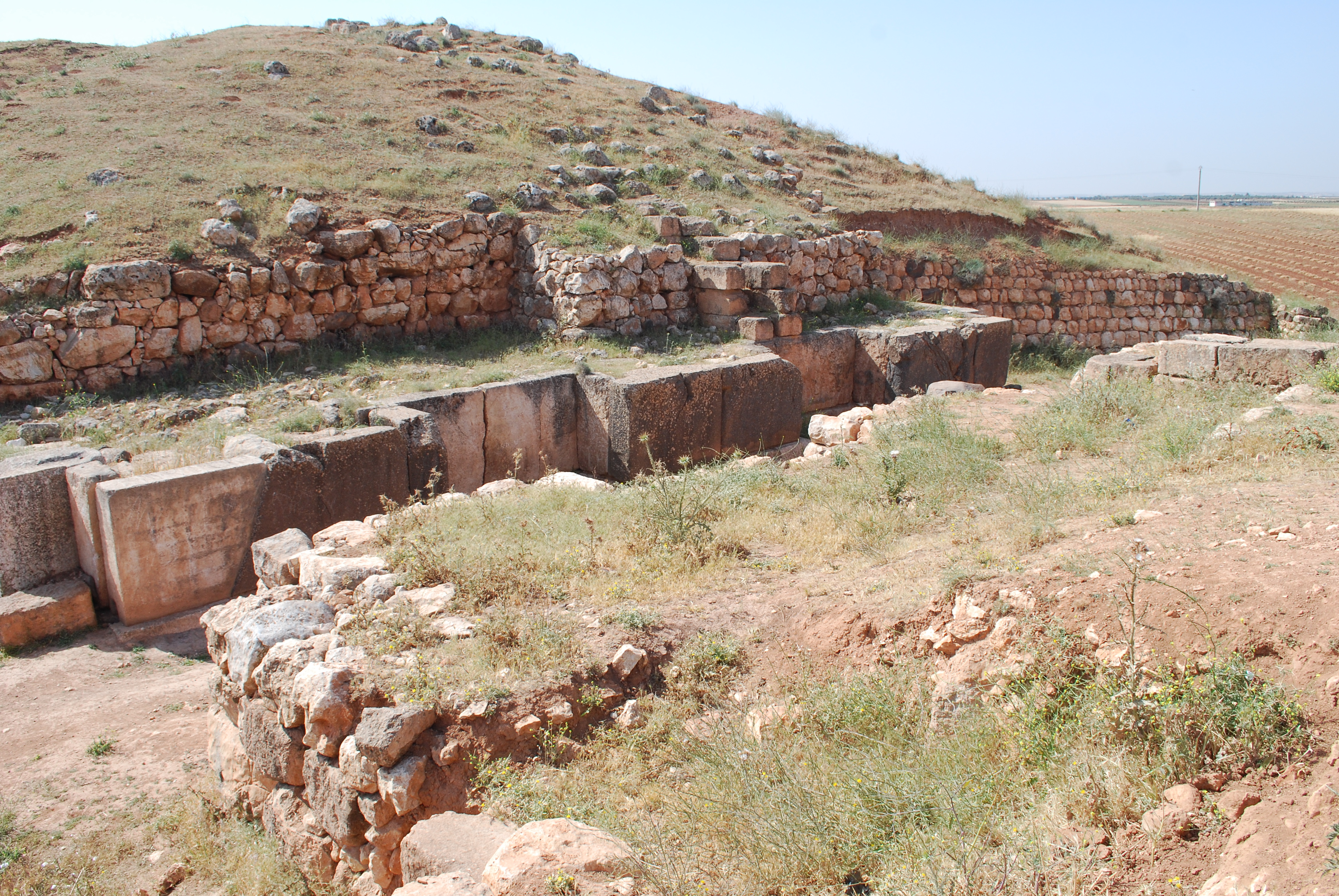
Parts of the excavations (Damascus gate)

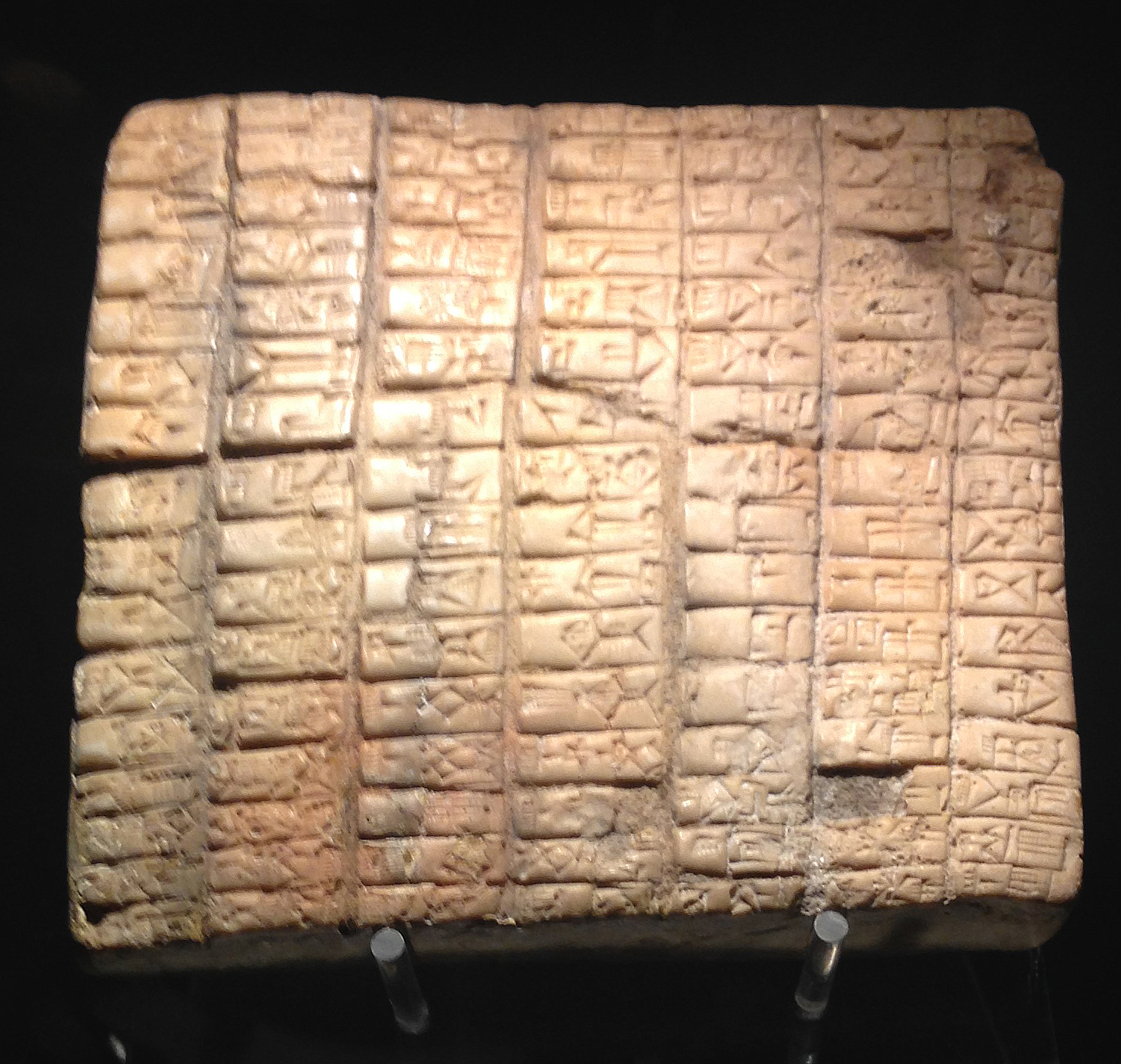
A tablet from the archive

In 1964, Italian archaeologists from the University of Rome La Sapienza under the direction of Paolo Matthiae began excavating at Tell Mardikh. In 1968, they recovered a statue dedicated to the goddess Ishtar bearing the name of Ibbit-Lim, mentioning him as king of Ebla. That identified the city, long known from Lagashite and Akkadian inscriptions. In the next decade, the team discovered a palace (palace G) dating from c. 2500–2000 BC. Finds in the palaces include a small sculpture made out of precious materials, Lapis lazuli, black stones and gold.

Thirteen full and fragmentary lenticular cuneiform tablets were found in the palace throne room, thought to have been there versus the archive because of the city's fall. In a storeroom off the throne room, the nearly complete standard of the queen and fragments believed to come from the standard of the king were found. Other artifacts included wood furniture inlaid with mother-of-pearl and composite statues created from colored stones. A silver bowl bearing king Immeya's name was recovered from the "Tomb of the Lord of the Goats", together with Egyptian jewels and an Egyptian ceremonial mace presented by pharaoh Hotepibre.

About 17,000 cuneiform tablet fragments were discovered; when put together, they constitute 2,500 complete tablets, making the archive of Ebla one of the biggest from the 3rd millennium BC. About 80% of the tablets are written using the usual Sumerian combination of logograms and phonetic signs, while the others exhibited an innovative, purely phonetic representation using Sumerian cuneiform of a previously unknown Semitic language, which was called "Eblaite". Bilingual Sumerian/Eblaite vocabulary lists were found among the tablets, allowing them to be translated. The tablets provide many important insights into the cultural, economic and political life in northern Mesopotamia around the middle of the 3rd millennium BC. They also provide insight into the everyday lives of the inhabitants, and contain information about state revenues, Sumerian-Eblaite dictionaries, diplomatic exchanges with foreign rulers, school texts, hymns and myths.

=== Library ===
The over 4000-year-old tablets constitute the oldest library ever found. At Ebla, “the archives or library constituted an orderly collection of records at least 500 years older than any other that had been found anywhere before.” There is evidence of their arrangement and classification. The larger tablets had originally been stored on shelves, but had fallen onto the floor when the palace was destroyed. The locations of the fallen tablets allowed the excavators to reconstruct their original positions on the shelves. They found the tablets had originally been shelved according to subject.

The palace, and its archive with it, was destroyed by fire during the Akkadian conquest of Ebla, probably around 2250 BCE under Naram-Sin. The tablets, most of which had not been deliberately fired, survived only because the conflagration hardened the clay; contemporary accounts suggest the archive was not considered a target of particular value by the invaders, and its preservation appears to have been an incidental effect of the destruction of the palace rather than a deliberate act of curation or protection.

These features were absent from earlier Sumerian excavations. Sophisticated techniques of arrangement of texts, coupled with their composition, evidence the great antiquity of archival and library practices, which may be far older than was assumed to be the case before the discovery of the Ebla library. A sizable portion of the tablets contain literary and lexicographic texts; evidence seems to suggest the collection also served – at least partially – as a true library rather than a collection of archives intended solely for use by the kings, their ministers, and their bureaucracy. Among the literary material were hymns, incantations, epics, mythological texts, and proverbs, alongside thirty-two bilingual Sumerian–Eblaite dictionaries and syllabaries. Some of these lexical texts survive in as many as eighteen duplicate copies bearing student errors and teacher corrections, suggesting the archive also functioned as a training collection for a scribal school. One syllabary organizes Sumerian signs according to their pronunciation, a system known as the acrophonic principle that predates its known use in Babylonian dictionaries by roughly 700 years. The tablets show evidence of the early transcription of texts into foreign languages and scripts, classification and cataloging for easier retrieval, and arrangement by size, form and content. The Ebla tablets have thus provided scholars with new insights into the origin of library practices that were in use 4,500 years ago.

While the absolute chronology of the archive is not yet certain a relative chronology for the 50-year period has been established. Because Ebla did not use Mesopotamian style year names or year numbers and the name of rulers was rarely mentioned in the texts scholars used script changes, grammar changes, and most importantly a prosopography of the members of the court, especially the wives and daughters of the king. The most relevant tablets for this effort were a series of yearly metal accounts and monthly linen accounts.

Most of the recovered tablets and tablet fragments were stored at the Idlib Regional Museum in Syria. Their current condition is unknown.

=== Legacy ===
Ebla's first kingdom is an example of early Syrian centralized states, and is considered one of the earliest empires by scholars, such as Samuel Finer, and Karl Moore, who consider it the first-recorded world power. Ebla's discovery changed the former view of Syria's history as a bridge between Mesopotamia and Egypt; it proved the region was a center of civilization in its own right.

== Syrian civil war ==
As a result of the Syrian civil war, excavations of Ebla stopped in March 2011. By 2013, it was under control of an opposition armed group called Arrows of the Right, who took advantage of its elevated location to use it as an observation point to watch for incoming government air attacks, as well as attempting to protect the site from looting. Many tunnels were dug and a crypt full of human remains was discovered; the remains were scattered and discarded by the robbers, who hoped to find jewelry and other precious artifacts. Besides excavations by rebels, nearby villagers also began digging at the site with the aim of finding and looting artifacts; some villagers removed carloads of soil suitable for making ceramic liners for bread-baking ovens from the tunnels. As the site was fortified for military purposes, the hill was also disrupted through the relocation of ruins and soils, some which were dumped in large mounds.

The site was captured by the Syrian Arab Armed Forces on 30 January 2020 during the 5th Northwestern Syria offensive, along with surrounding villages. In 2024, archaeologists of the Sapienza University of Rome carried out a short recovery and restoration campaign at Ebla, assessing the civil war damage on the site and restoring some buildings such as the "Sanctuary of the Deified Ancestors". As part of the recovery efforts, they shifted through the rubble created by the military activity of previous years; the Italian team also discovered a new basalt royal statue of the 2nd millennium BC.

== See also ==
- Azi (scribe)
- Biblical archaeology
- Cities of the Ancient Near East
- Dugurasu
- List of kings of Ebla
- Short chronology timeline
- Tell Beydar
