= Azi (scribe) =

Azi (fl. c. 2500 BC) is the name of a scribe from the kingdom of Ebla. His name has been found on a number of clay tablets, making possible an extrapolation of his career path.

== Career ==
He began as a student and passed examinations to become a scribe. He was a highly competent teacher, known from his title, dub-zu-zu, or "one who knows the tablets." Finally, he became a top administrator in the kingdom.

== Sources ==
- Quest for the past. Pleasantville: Reader's Digest Association. 1984. p. 54. ISBN 0-89577-170-5.
