= Haddu =

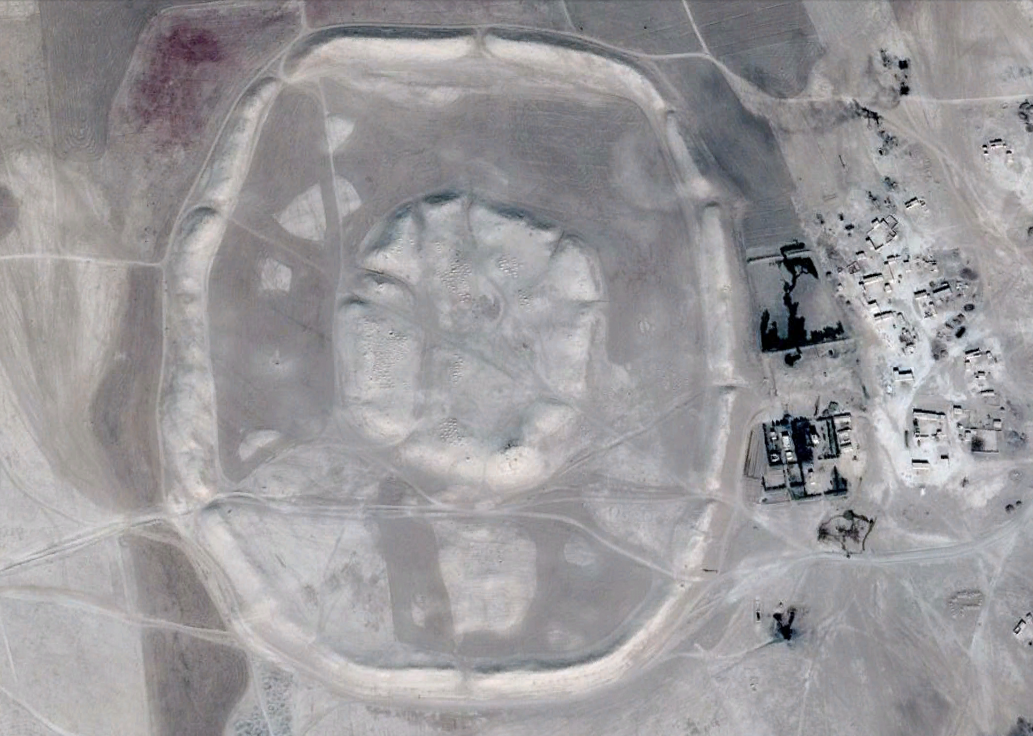
- The remains of Haddu

- Location within Syria
- 35.93°N 40.347°E
- Location: Syria
- Region: Deir ez-Zor Governorate

Haddu, identified with the modern Tell Malhat ed-Deru (تل مليحة الدور), was an ancient kingdom in northern Syria in Deir ez-Zor Governorate.

== History ==
=== Early Bronze ===
In the middle of the third millennium BC, the Kingdom of Haddu flourished and controlled the middle Khabur valley.

==== Ebla-Mari War ====
It was ruled by its own monarch who was a vassal of Ebla, and fought against the kingdom of Mari. The king of Haddu declared to Mari's ambassador that he "I and Ebla have a pact of peace. And the oath of the pact is before Kura (the main Eblaite god) and before Hadda".
