= Ibbit-Lim =

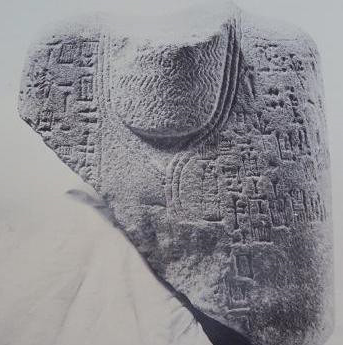
- Fragmentary torso of Ibbit-Lim

King of Ebla
- Reign: c. 1975 BC
- Father: Igrish-Kheb

Ibbit-Lim (fl. c. 1975 BC) was the earliest known ruler of the Third kingdom of Ebla, in modern Syria.

== Reign ==
Ibbit-Lim is only known by a fragmentary basalt torso found in 1968 at Tell Mardikh and now in Idleb, which was part of a votive statue for Ishtar, once placed in this goddess' temple in the acropolis of Ebla. A cuneiform inscription on it bears the name of the meki (king) of Ebla Ibbit-Lim, son of Igrish-Kheb, and claims that the statue was made "eight years after Ishtar's apparition in Ebla". It is believed that this text passage refers to the election of Ishtar as the poliadic goddess of Ebla, an action most likely brought by Ibbit-Lim himself, eight years before making the statue.
Ibbit-Lim's torso was the first evidence permitting the identification of Tell Mardikh with the ancient city of Ebla, whose location had been lost.

As one of the earliest rulers – if not the first one – of the Third kingdom of Ebla, Ibbit-Lim may have been the king who ordered the construction of city walls. The names of Ibbit-Lim and his father Igrish-Kheb – who is not known to have been a king – are Amorite, suggesting that the inhabitants of Third kingdom of Ebla were predominantly Amorites, as were most of the inhabitants of Syria at that time.

== Sources ==
- Matthiae, Paolo (2010). Ebla. La città del trono (in Italian). Einaudi. ISBN 978-88-06-20258-3.
