= List of kings of Ebla =

Kings of an ancient Syrian city

The list of kings of Ebla includes the known monarchs of Ebla who ruled three consecutive kingdoms. For the first kingdom's monarchs, tablets listing offerings to kings mention ten names, and another list mentions 33 kings. (Note: Tablet TM.74.G.120 discovered by Alfonso Archi.) No kings are known from the second kingdom and all dates are estimates according to the Middle chronology.

== First Eblaite kingdom (c. 3100 – c. 2290 BC) ==
#	Depiction	Ruler	Succession	Approx. date of reign	Comments
1st		Sakume	Unclear succession	Uncertain, fl. c. 3100 BC	The first king ruled approximately 660 years before the destruction of the first kingdom; the year 2400 was used by Robert R Stieglitz as the date of the destruction resulting in the year c. 3100 BC for the beginning of Sakume's reign
2nd		Su (.) (...)	Unclear succession	Uncertain	Name damaged
3rd		Ladau	Unclear succession	Uncertain	
4th		Abugar	Unclear succession	Uncertain	
5th		Namnelanu	Unclear succession	Uncertain	
6th		Dumudar	Unclear succession	Uncertain	
7th		Ibla	Unclear succession	Uncertain	
8th		Kulbanu	Unclear succession	Uncertain	
9th		Assanu	Unclear succession	Uncertain	
10th		Samiu	Unclear succession	Uncertain	
11th		Zialu	Unclear succession	Uncertain	
Early Dynastic I period (c. 2900 – c. 2700 BC)
12th		Enmanu	Unclear succession	Uncertain, fl. c. 2740 BC	
13th		Namanu	Unclear succession	Uncertain, fl. c. 2720 BC	
Early Dynastic II period (c. 2700 – c. 2600 BC)
14th		Da (.) (.)	Unclear succession	Uncertain, fl. c. 2700 BC	Name damaged
15th		Sagisu	Unclear succession	Uncertain, fl. c. 2680 BC	
16th		Dane'um	Unclear succession	Uncertain, fl. c. 2660 BC	
17th		Ibbini-Lim	Unclear succession	Uncertain, fl. c. 2640 BC	
18th		Ishrut-Damu	Unclear succession	Uncertain, fl. c. 2620 BC	
Early Dynastic IIIa period (c. 2600 – c. 2500 BC)
19th		Isidu	Unclear succession	Uncertain, fl. c. 2600 BC	
20th		Isrut-Halam	Unclear succession	Uncertain, fl. c. 2580 BC	
21st		Iksud	Unclear succession	Uncertain, fl. c. 2560 BC	
22nd		Talda-Lim	Unclear succession	Uncertain, fl. c. 2540 BC	
23rd		Abur-Lim	Unclear succession	Uncertain, fl. c. 2520 BC	
Early Dynastic IIIb period (c. 2500 – c. 2400 BC)
24th		Agur-Lim	Unclear succession	Uncertain, fl. c. 2500 BC	
25th		Ib-Damu I	Unclear succession	Uncertain, fl. c. 2480 BC	A seal bearing his name was found in Kültepe
26th		Baga-Damu	Unclear succession	Uncertain, fl. c. 2460 BC	
27th		Enar-Damu	Unclear succession	Uncertain, fl. c. 2440 BC	Amongst the most referenced deified kings in the offering lists
28th		Eshar-Malik	Unclear succession	Uncertain, fl. c. 2420 BC	
Proto-Imperial period (c. 2400 – c. 2290 BC)
29th		Kun-Damu	Unclear succession	Uncertain, fl. c. 2400 BC	
30th		Adub-Damu	Unclear succession	Uncertain, fl. c. 2380 BC	Short reign
31st		Igrish-Halam	Unclear succession	Uncertain, fl. c. 2360 BC (12 years)	
32nd		Irkab-Damu	Son of Igrish-Halam	c. 2351 - c. 2340 BC (11 or 12 years)	Died same year as Enna-Dagan of Mari
33rd		Isar-Damu	Son of Irkab-Damu	c. 2340 - c. 2305 BC (35 years)	His Queen was Tabur-Damu
		Ir'ak-Damu	Son of Isar-Damu	Uncertain	A prince, might have ascended the throne for a short period; Pottery seals of the Egyptian pharaoh Pepi I have been found in the destruction layer of the city

== Second Eblaite kingdom (c. 2290 – c. 2030 BC) ==
Ebla arose again for a time during the Ur III period (c. 2100 BC) though no ruler names are yet known. It may have been a vassal of Ur for a time.

== Third Eblaite kingdom (c. 2030 – c. 1590 BC) ==
#	Depiction	Ruler	Succession	Approx. date of reign	Comments
Isin-Larsa period (c. 2025 – c. 1763 BC)
		Igrish-Heba	Unclear succession	Uncertain, fl. c. 2000 BC	
		Ibbit-Lim	Son of Igrish-Heba	Uncertain, fl. c. 2000 – c. 1950 BC	
		Ib-Damu II	Unclear succession	Uncertain, fl. c. 2000 – c. 1750 BC	
Old Babylonian period (c. 1763 – c. 1590 BC)
		Immeya	Unclear succession	Uncertain, fl. c. 1750 – c. 1725 BC	His grave is identified with the so-called "Tomb of the Lord of the Goats"
		Hammu(....)	Unclear succession	Uncertain, fl. c. 1750 BC	A successor of Immeya, not necessarily the direct one, the name was damaged but probably Hammurabi
		Sir-Damu	Unclear succession	Uncertain, fl. c. 1750 – c. 1600 BC	
		Indilimma	Son of Sir-Damu	Uncertain, fl. c. 1600 BC	
		Memal...arri? (Maratewari)	Unclear succession	Uncertain, fl. c. 1600 BC	

== Gallery ==
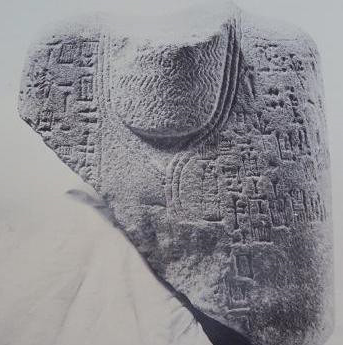
Ibbit-Lim statue, dated to the third kingdom c. 2000 BC

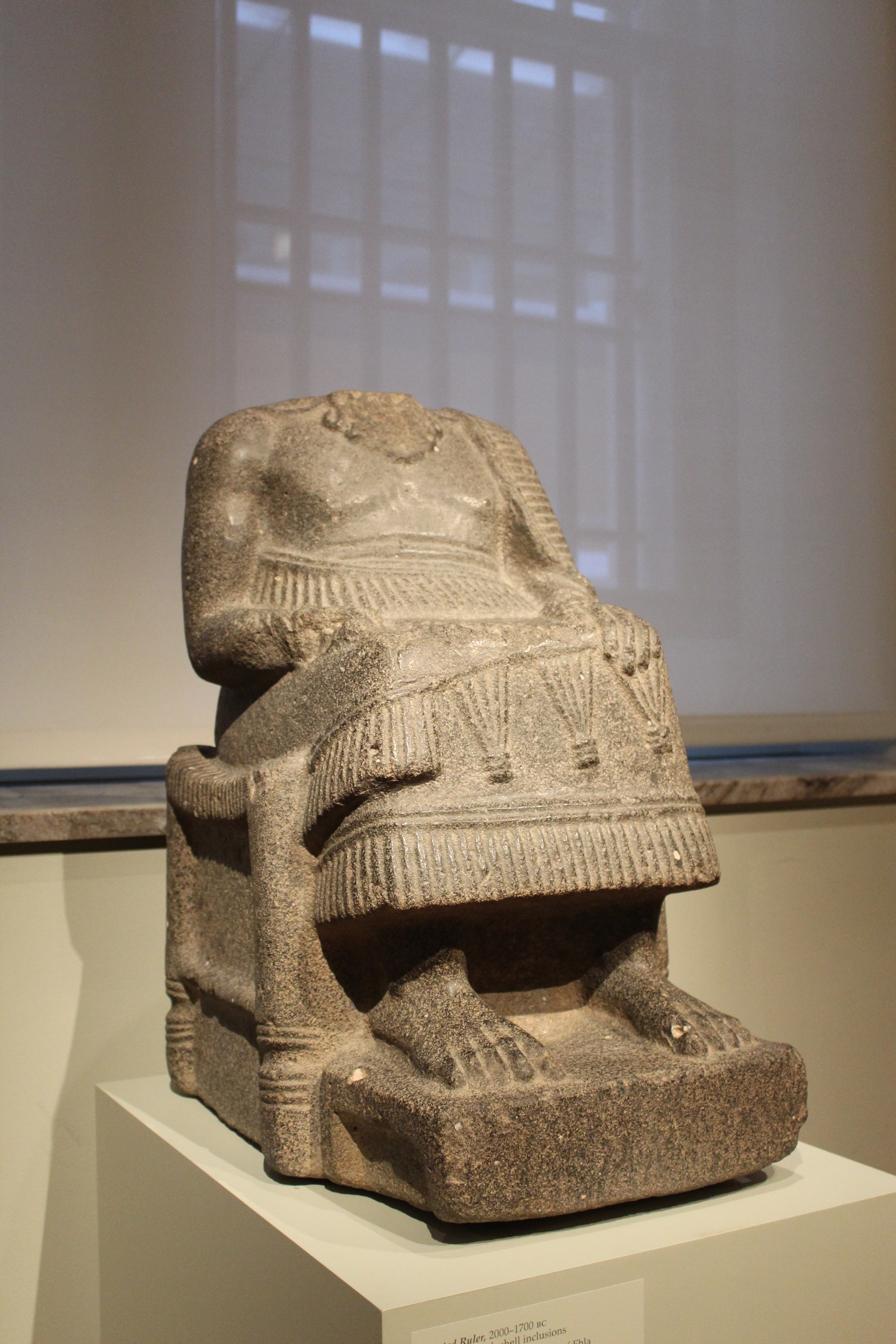
Seated ruler, dated to the third kingdom, exhibited at the Cleveland Museum of Art

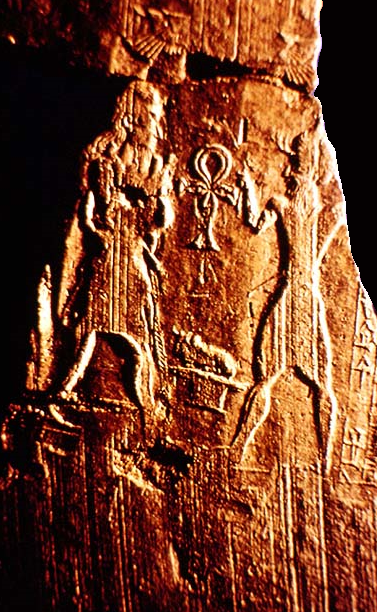
Prince Maratewari (left), crown prince of king Indilimma
