= East Semitic languages =

Subgroup of the Semitic languages

East Semitic
- Mesopotamic
- Geographic distribution: formerly Mesopotamia
- Linguistic classification: Afro-Asiatic: Semitic; East Semitic
- Subdivisions: Akkadian; Eblaite; Kishite; Dilmunite?

Language codes
- Glottolog: east2678

Approximate historical distribution of Semitic languages. East Semitic in green.

The East Semitic languages are one of three branches of the Semitic language family. This branch is known from three languages, Akkadian, Eblaite, and possibly Kishite, all of which are now extinct. They were influenced by the non-Semitic Sumerian language and adopted cuneiform writing.

East Semitic languages stand apart from other Semitic languages, which are traditionally called West Semitic, in a number of respects. Historically, it is believed that the linguistic situation came about as speakers of East Semitic languages wandered further east, settling in Mesopotamia during the 3rd millennium BC, as attested by Akkadian texts from this period. By the early 2nd millennium BC, East Semitic languages, in particular Akkadian, had come to dominate the region.

== Phonology ==
Modern understanding of the phonology of East Semitic languages can be derived only from careful study of written texts and comparison with the reconstructed Proto-Semitic. Most striking is the reduction of the inventory of back consonants, the velar and pharyngeal fricatives, as well as glottals. Akkadian preserves *ḫ and (partly) *ḥ only as a single phoneme transcribed ḫ and usually reconstructed as a voiceless velar or uvular fricative. All of the sounds *ʾ, *h, *ʿ, *ġ have been lost. Their elision appears to give rise to the presence of an e vowel where it is not found in other Semitic languages (for example, Akk. bēl 'master' < PS. *ba‘al). It also appears that the series of interdental fricatives became sibilants (for example, Akk. šalšu 'three' < PS. *ṯalaṯ). However, the exact phonological makeup of the languages is not fully known, and the absence of features may have been the result of the inadequacies of Sumerian orthography to describe the sounds of Semitic languages, rather than their real absence.

The word order in East Semitic may also have been influenced by Sumerian by being subject–object–verb, rather than the West Semitic verb–subject–object.
