= Paolo Matthiae =

Italian archaeologist (born 1940)

- Born: 1940 (age 85–86); Rome, Italy
- Education: Sapienza University of Rome
- Occupation: Archaeologist
- Known for: Discovery of Ebla
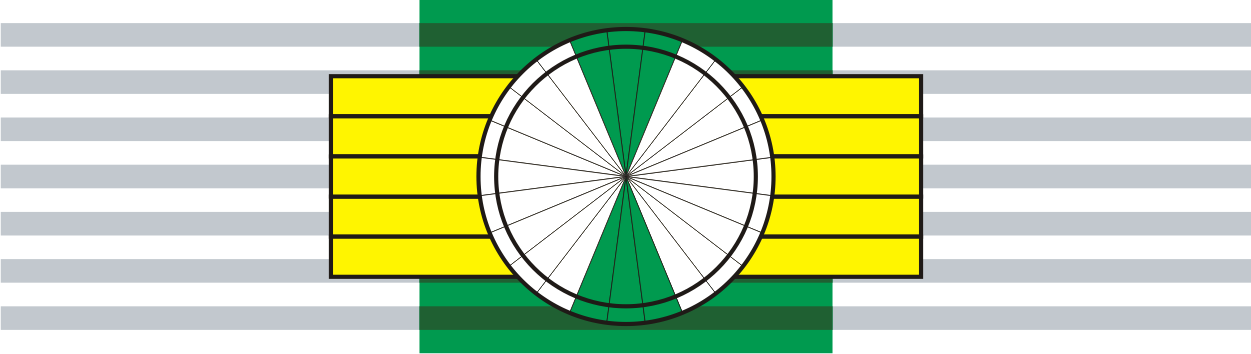
- Awards: Order of Civil Merit (Excellent class) (2023)

Paolo Matthiae (born 1940) is an Italian archaeologist. He is a professor of History of Art of the Ancient Near East in the University of Rome La Sapienza. He has been Director of the Ebla Expedition since 1963—in fact, its discoverer—and has published many articles and books about Ebla and about the History of Art of Mesopotamia and Syria in general. In 1972 and 1973, Matthiae co-directed the excavation of Tell Fray in the Euphrates Valley that was to be flooded by Lake Assad, the reservoir of the Tabqa Dam which was being constructed at that time. He is a member of institutions as the Accademia Nazionale dei Lincei (Rome), the Academie des Inscriptions et Belles-Lettres and the Deutsches Archaeologisches Institut, and is doctor honoris causa of the Autonomous University of Madrid.

== Books ==
- Matthiae, Paolo (2020). Ebla. Archaeology and History. London: Routledge. ISBN 9781315724607.
- Matthiae, Paolo; Marchetti, Nicolò (2013). Ebla and Its Landscape: Early State Formation in the Ancient Near East. London: Routledge. ISBN 978-1-61132-228-6.
- Matthiae, Paolo (1995). Ebla, la città rivelata. Milano: Electa/Gallimard.
- Aux origines de la Syrie : Ebla retrouvée. Découvertes Gallimard / Archéologie (in French). Vol. 276. Éditions Gallimard. 1996.
- Matthiae, Paolo (1980). Ebla: An Empire Rediscovered. Translated by Christopher Holme. Garden City, NY: Doubleday.

== Honours ==
=== National honours ===
- Syria:
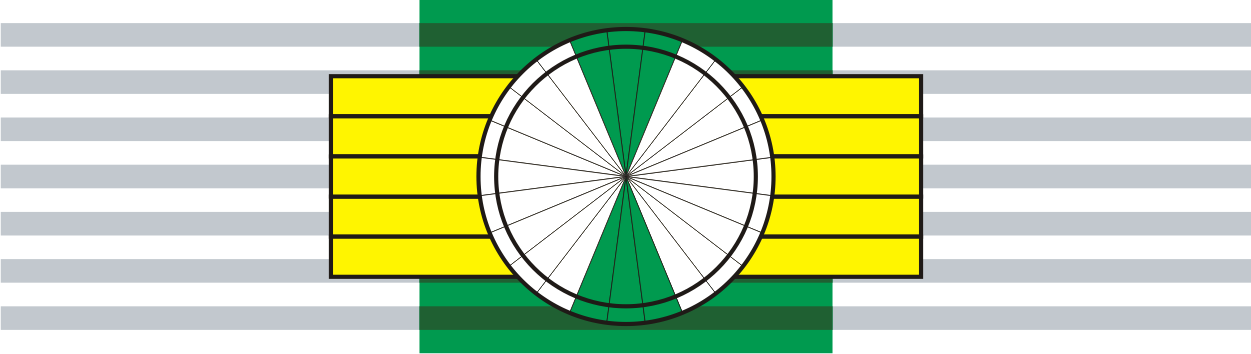
  - Order of Civil Merit (Excellent class) (2023)
