= Tall Bazi =

Ancient Near East archaeological site in Raqqa Governorate of Syria

- Location within Syria
- 36°25′38.3″N 38°16′35.4″E
- Type: settlement
- Periods: Bronze Age
- Cultures: Mitanni, Early Dynastic
- Location: Raqqa Governorate, Syria

History
- Built: c. 2400 BC
- Abandoned: 1200 BC

Site notes
- Excavation dates: 1993-2010
- Archaeologists: B. Einwag, A. Otto
- Condition: Ruined
- Owner: Public
- Public access: Yes

Tall Bazi (also Tell Bazi), is an ancient Near East archaeological site in Raqqa Governorate of Syria in the same general area as Mari and Ebla. It is located on the east bank of Euphrates river in upper Syria, about 60 kilometers south of Turkey border. It is considered a twin site to the adjacent Tell Banat Complex. Both were occupied in the 3rd and 2nd millennium BC with Banat being the focus in the early part and Bazi in the later. Tall Bazi has been proposed as the location of Armanum, known from texts of Sargon and Naram-Sin in the Akkadian period, during the reign of Naram-Sin of Akkad. It was occupied into the Mitanni period, with an occupational gap after c. 2300 BC, at which time it was destroyed. In the Roman Imperial Age, a large building was constructed at the top of the main mound, using the remaining Late Bronze Age fortification walls.

== Location ==
In ancient times, the site consisted of a large lower town and the high citadel. Also nearby, about one half a kilometer to the south, the large Tell Banat Complex was located on the lower ground. It consisted of several tells and the lower town. Around 1999, because of the construction of the Tishrin Dam nearby, the whole area was flooded, and only the Tall Bazi citadel still remains above water.

== History ==
=== Early Bronze ===
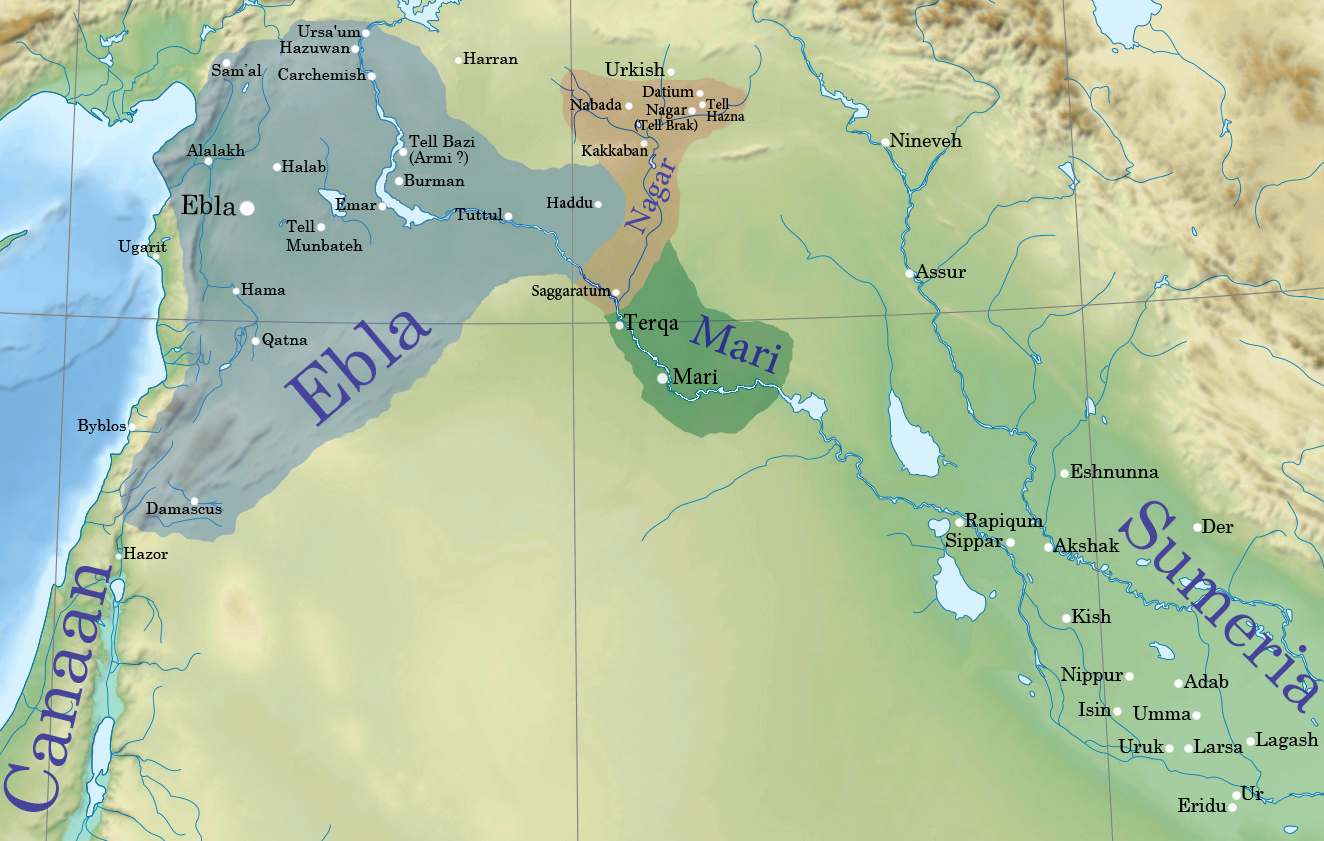
Tall Bazi on the map of Ancient Near East (as possibly the site of Armi/Armanum). The time period is during the first kingdom of Ebla around 2340 BC. To the east, the kingdom of Nagar controlled most of the Khabur basin at that time

Both Tall Bazi and Tall Banat were located along the Euphrates river. During the Early Bronze Age, a massive town wall protected this whole settlement area away from the river. This Banat-Bazi complex started about 2600 B.C., and continued during the Early Bronze Age III and IV.

An Early Bronze palace was found beneath the Middle Bronze temple. The earlier occupation of the Citadel dates back to the Late Early Dynastic period and Akkadian period. Numerous clay bi-conical sling shots as well as leaf shaped flint arrowheads were found especially around a fortified wall gate. The citadel, along with occupation on Tell Bannat, was destroyed c. 2300 BC and a gap in occupation ensued.

=== Middle Bronze ===
The Northern Town of the lower area was occupied beginning in the Middle Bronze Age and was destroyed at the same time as the Western Town, in the Late Bronze Age. A geomagnetic prospection followed by excavation at four locations showed that the original portion was a grown settlement with later construction matching the planned houses of the Western Town.

The main mound has been dubbed the "Citadel". It contained a large (37.6 meter long by 15.8 meter wide) temple built in the Middle Bronze Age (on top of an Early Bronze Age palace) still in use when it was destroyed at the same time as the 200 meter by 250 meter lower town in the Late Bronze Age.

In the Middle Bronze II, Tall Bazi would have been in between larger powers like Carchemish (north), Aleppo (west; Yamhad), and Mari (southeast).

=== Late Bronze (Mitanni Period) ===
In this period the 18 hectare city was probably named Baṣīru. The two cuneiform tablets found at the site indicate that, in the Mittani period, the city did not have a king, but was governed by the city elders.

The temple of this period had 2 to 3 meter thick walls and was enter from the east between two life-sized limetone lion statues. It had a large altar faced with stone slabs fronted had a large basin which had contained beer. In the remains of the temple on the main mound were found evidence of significant production and ritual consumption of beer as well as two cuneiform land grant tablets of the Mitanni period one (Bz 51) sealed by ruler Saushtatar which gave the town of Baidali to the people of Baṣīru, one (Bz 50) by ruler Artatama I, and an Old Babylonian cylinder seal. When the settlement was destroyed the temple was looted and equipment smashed, then burned like the lower town. More post destruction looting then occurred. It is generally assumed that the city was destroyed by the Hittites, under ruler Šuppiluliuma I (c. 1350–1322 BC), who are known to have attacked the nearby cites of Emar and Karkemis at the same time.

The Western Town (Weststadt, 1 hectare) is a single period area of the Late Bronze Age. It represents a later expansion of the city, and it lasted up to a century before being violently destroyed. It contained about 100 houses with a central market area and planned 6 meter wide main roads with spurs into residential areas. Houses were built to a standard design with little variation. Destruction appears to have come quickly as most material was still in place. Each house had its own oven for baking and vats for the production of beer. Most houses had a table-like installation on the short wall opposite the door associated with vessels, bones, and other objects leading the excavator to consider them to be for domestic cult practices. In one house a large number of weight stones belonging to different weight systems were found, suggesting it was an office of merchants. The Northern Town and Citadel were destroyed at the same time. No human remains were found. Due to the sketchy nature of radiocarbon dating for this period dates radiocarbon samples have reported dates ranging from 1400 BC down to 1200 BC for the destruction layer. A Mitanni period cylinder seal was found. A few geometrically-shaped faience tokens, generally called "gaming tokens" were found as well beads and pendants fashioned from ostrich shells.

=== Roman period ===
During the Roman Empire, a fortified sanctuary was built on Tall Bazi, which can be dated to the late 1st or 2nd century AD.

=== Modern times ===
As a result of the Syrian Civil War the top of the mound was turned into a military emplacement with much of the remains, including the temple, being destroyed by bulldozer activity. Archaeological finds still being held at the site were robbed away by ISIS.

== Tell Banat Complex ==
In ancient times, Tall Bazi was possibly part of the Tell Banat Settlement Complex (Tell Banat, Tell Banat North, and Tell Kabir). The area was excavated as part of the Euphrates Salvage Project. The site of Tell Saghir, adjacent to the north, was not excavated. Some differences in dating between excavators of Tall Bazi and the Complex cause difficulty in aligning them chronologically.

- Tell Kabir (also Tall Kabir) - Lies 1 kilometer southwest of Tell Banat. A low mound covers an area of about 2.3 hectares with a 13 meter by 22 meter 3rd millennium BC temple in antis having two meter thick stone walls at the summit. Occupation began in Banat Period III though virgin soil was not reached in the excavation and there were indications of earlier occupation. The temple was abandoned at the end of the Late Bronze Age and was replaced by domestic occupation until the Middle Bronze Age.
- Tell Banat - The mound has an area of about 25 hectares encircled by a massive stone wall on the south and east. One building, built on a 3 meter deep gravel base and thought to be a palace, contained a 3rd millennium BC monumental tomb with 5 chambers. The tomb was constructed with dressed stone walls, a bitumen coated baked brick floor, and a ceiling of one ton limestone slabs.
- Tell Banat North - Used as a mortuary site in the 3rd millennium BC Banat Periods IV and III and holds the structure known as the White Monument. The mound is 22 meters high and 100 meters in diameter. Large quanities of clay bi-conical sling shots were found. Tell Banat North was excavated from 1988 to 1999 by McClellan and Porter.

Four periods of occupation are defined for the Tell Banat Complex:

- Banat Period IV (2700/2600 – 2450 BC)
- Banat Period III (2450 – 2300 BC)
- Banat Period II (2300 - 2100 BC) - abandoned though nearby Tell Bazi appears to have remained occupied
- Banat Period I (2100 BC - Late Bronze Age) - Tell Kabir only, with modest domestic activity on Tell Banat

== Archaeology ==
The fortified main mound rose 60 meters above the plain with the unfortified lower town portion, to the west, being only 7 meters high. The fortification walls around the main mound were constructed of large limestone block. The lower town area was divided into a Western Town and Northern Town.

The site was excavated by German archaeologists in 1993–1997, in 1999, in 2001–2005, and then in 2007–2009. At this point local conditions became too difficult to continue work. The excavations were under the auspices of the German Research Foundation and later the Institute of Near Eastern Archaeology.

Due to the Tishrin Dam construction, the lower town of Tall Bazi is now under water. The main mound (the Citadel) is still above water. The adjacent third millennium BC archaeological complex at Tall Banat was entirely flooded.

== See also ==
- Cities of the ancient Near East
- Emar
- Jerablus Tahtani
- Mumbaqat
- Tell Hadidi
