= Irisaĝrig =

Ancient city in Iraq

Irisaĝrig (iri-saĝ-rig₇^{ki}), also Urusagrig, Iri-Saĝrig, and in the Akkadian language Al-Šarrākī "City of the (Divine) Donors" or alternatively "City of Thieves", was an ancient Near East city in Iraq whose location is not known with certainty but is currently thought to be at the site of Tell al-Wilayah, on the ancient Mama-šarrat canal off the Tigris river, near the ancient site of Kesh, Tulul al-Baqarat. The city was occupied during the Early Dynastic, Akkadian, Ur III, and early Old Babylonian periods. While cuneiform tablets from the city had appeared from time to time, the flood of artifacts entering the private market from looting which followed the 2003 war in Iraq included a large number from Irisaĝrig. This spurred interest by archaeologists in finding the site. The city became of popular interest because of the Hobby Lobby smuggling scandal which resulted in a large number of Irisaĝrig artifacts and cuneiform tablets being repatriated to Iraq without being recorded and published first. While there were a number of significant temples in the city, the titular deity is not known though the Isin-Larsa period literary composition Lament for Eridu names the goddess Aruru in that role. It has also been suggested that there were temples of Ashgi and Alla. There is known to have been a temple of Ninisina and one of Nergal of Eresh in Irisagrig in the Ur III period, at least back to the reign of Shu-Suen and Amar-Sin respectively, and continuing under the rule of Malgium. During the Ur III period sacrifices and donations were made to Ninḫursaĝa of Irisaĝrig suggesting there was at least a shrine in Irisaĝrig. One researcher has suggested that another logogram for the city was e_{2}-nu-zuḫ "City of Thieves".

An alternate name for Ursagrig during the Akkadian Empire and Ur III periods has been proposed as Šarrākum (possibly a variation of Al-Šarrākī). This suggestion has been contested.

== Location ==
In 1992, Douglas Frayne proposed the site of Umm al-Hafriyat, near Nippur, as the location based a) on it being 4 rowing days upstream from Umma on the Iturungal canal off the Euphrates river, suggested by an early itinerary, b) on it being the largest mound north of Adab with known Early Dynastic and Sargonic remains and c) on reports of the quality of tablet making clay at the site. After more consideration, in 2001, Piotr Steinkeller judged that the site had to lie off the Tigris river and not the Euphrates and must lie north of Adab. He suggested several unnamed mounds as possible locations for Irisaĝrig.

More Ur III texts became available on boat journeys between Irisaĝrig, Nippur, and Umma, combined with better information of ancient watercourse in the area, allowed refinement on the distances involved. Texts indicated Irisaĝrig was two towing days from the Tabbi-Mama canal and also on the Mama-šarrat canal. It has been suggested those were actually two phases of the same canal. Additionally, satellite photographs of looting activity were correlated with the appearance of tablets from the site on the private market. Surface surveys also were checked to match the periods when the city was known to be occupied. The result was a proposal that Irisaĝrig was located at one of two sites 1) Site #1032 - 80 kilometers upstream of Umma, and 2) Site #1056 - 76 kilometers upstream of Umma on the Adams survey.

Further work negated an assumption of earlier researchers that Irisaĝrig was near to Nippur, actually being somewhat further away. Excavation at Tulul al-Baqarat showed it to be the site of Kesh. Irisaĝrig and Kesh were known from inscriptions to be very near to each other with the later acting as a cult site under the control of the former. Tulul al-Baqarat is about 6 kilometers from Tell al-Wilayah. They are also connected by a canal. Irisaĝrig is known to have been quite large and the proposed Tell al-Wilayah site is a sizable 64 hectares. Surface surveys and brief excavations by Iraqi archaeologists at the site have also shown it to have been occupied at the proper times. This all has led to the current proposal that Tell al-Wilayah is Irisaĝrig. This is not without some scholarly dissent. Steinkeller has stated that Tell al-Wilayah is definitely not Irisaĝrig but may actually be ancient Anzagar. Anzagar lay near to Irisaĝrig and held a temple of Ninegal and shrines or sanctuaries of Ninḫursaĝ, PAP.NAGAR, Nergal, Allātum, and Inana. Another proposed location is at Tell Jidr.

It is known that the city of Der was on the road between Irisaĝrig and Pašime.

== Archaeology ==
While Irisaĝrig has not yet been excavated (or definitely located) thousands of cuneiform tablets, generally thought to total in the area of 3500, from there are available as a result of looting. The majority are from the Ur III period. The large number of tablets allows analysis such as the determination of the calendar system in use in Irisaĝrig, one only found in Sargonic tablets from Tell al-Willayah. A unique rationing system was also in place in the city. The tablets also document numerous visits by the Ur III rulers for reasons as yet unclear but possibly related to the presence of three temples to deified rulers Šulgi, Amar-Suena, and Šu-Suen of that dynasty in Irisaĝrig as well as a funerary chapel for Ur-Nammu. It is known that there were other temples at for Šulpae, Ašgi, PAP.NAGAR, and Šimtiša and that a second temple of Šu-Suen was built at Nēber-Šu-Suen (Ford of Šu-Suen), a new settlement built near Irisaĝrig. Many of the texts refer to provisioning of messengers and royal functionaries. A typical excerpt would be "1 portion of mutton, 2 liters of soup (and) 2 fish (for) Enna-Suen, envoy of the king, when he came to capture bandits".

== History ==
The city of Irisaĝrig is known through a number of cuneiform inscriptions dating back into the Early Dynastic IIIb period. It was also occupied during the Sargonic period. Two year names of Akkadian Empire rulers mention Urusagrig ie "Year in which Il the temple official of Urusagrig was seized" and "Year in which the ensi of Nippur allied? with Urusagrig ...". From a seal the name of one governor under the Akkadian Empire ruler Naram-Sin is known, prince and son of Naram-Sin Šaratigubišin (earlier thought to be either a son of Shar-Kali-Sharri or the son of a Gutian king):

^{d}Na-ra-am-^{d}Suen / LUGAL / ki-ib-ra-tim / ar-ba-im - NaramSuen, king of the Four Quarters of the World
Sar-a-ti-gu-bi-si-in / ENSI_{2} / Uru-sag-rig_{7}^{ki} / DUMU-su - Šaratigubišin, governor of Urusagrig, his son

During the time of the Ur III empire it was a major provincial capital and transportation hub. It was also closely linked in this period with the unlocated ancient city of Garšana and known to be a transshipment point for goods to Der. Thanks to the numerous records produced by that empire much is known about the city, its daily life, and its interactions, especially trade related, with other parts of the empire. One ensi (governor) under Ur, Lubanda, is known from a seal of Shulgi. Other governors, Nanna-zišaĝal, Ur-mes, Dadani, and Ilallum are known from other texts. The chronology of these governors:

- Lubanda - Š 35 to Š 38
- Nannazišaĝal Š 46 to AS 2
- Ur-mes - AS 3 to AS 7
- Ilalum and Dadani AS 7 to AS 9
- Urmes AS 9 to IS 2

At least 28 members of the Ur III royal family, princes and princesses known by name, were present in Irisaĝrig at various times. In addition to the local governors of Irisaĝrig a large number of governors from other cities, including A-kal-la of Adab, Ḫa-ba-lu₅-gé, governor of Adab, Da-da-ga of Giša/Umma, I-tu-ri-a, governor of Ešnunna, and Da-da-ga of Giša/Umma are known to have visited Irisaĝrig.

An example of daily life would be the woman Ninsaga, daughter of governor under Ur rulers from Amar-Sin (year 7) through Shu-Sin up to Ibbi-Sîn (year 9) Ur-mes, who managed her large estate in the city. The wife of Ur-mes was Baqar-tum, daughter of Šulgi, sister of Šu-Suen. The estate included hundreds of male and female slaves. Two other governors are known to have followed Ur-mes, Ilalum and Dadani. In a text found at nearby Kesh another governor, la-ra-ra dumu is-[gar], is mentioned.

Another example would be the merchant Turam-ili, known from an archive of tablets from the private market which have now been assigned to Irisaĝrig. And a scribe, Ilum-asu, who along with his father Bibi and brothers Mašum and Ašgi-ibra handled the administration of rations for a number of workers in Irisaĝrig.

With the Ur empire in decline the city of Malgium conquered Irisaĝrig roughly after year 10 of Ibbi-Sin (c. 2028–2004 BC), the last ruler of the Ur III empire. Tablets showed that six rulers of Malium ruled over Irisaĝrig. They left the existing Ur III administrative system in place while changing to the calendar of Malgium.

The eleventh year name of Larsa ruler Warad-Sin (c. 1834-1823 BC) read "Year the city (wall) of Al-Šarrākī (sag.rig_{7}^{ki}) was restored". This would be the latest historical mention of Irisaĝrig. An alternative interpretation of the textual evidence sets that in the 12th year name of Warad-Sin as "Year Warad-Sin the king restored the city of Al-Šarrākī". Other soruces had it as being the 16th year name of Warad-Sin.

== See also ==
- Cities of the ancient Near East
