= List of cities of the ancient Near East =

The earliest cities in history were in the ancient Near East, an area covering roughly that of the modern Middle East: its history began in the 4th millennium BC and ended, depending on the interpretation of the term, either with the conquest by the Achaemenid Empire in the 6th century BC or with that by Alexander the Great in the 4th century BC.

The largest cities of the Bronze Age Near East housed several tens of thousands of people. Memphis in the Early Bronze Age, with some 30,000 inhabitants, was the largest city of the time by far. Ebla is estimated to have had a population of 40,000 inhabitants in the Intermediate Bronze age. Ur in the Middle Bronze Age is estimated to have had some 65,000 inhabitants; Babylon in the Late Bronze Age similarly had a population of some 50,000–60,000. Niniveh had some 20,000–30,000, reaching 100,000 only in the Iron Age (around 700 BC).

In Akkadian and Hittite orthography, URU𒌷 became a determinative sign denoting a city, or combined with KUR𒆳 "land" the kingdom or territory controlled by a city, e.g. 𒈗𒆳𒌷𒄩𒀜𒌅𒊭 LUGAL KUR ^{URU}Ha-ad-tu-sha "the king of the country of (the city of) Ḫattuša". The KI 𒆠 determinative is used following place names (toponyms) in both Sumerian and Akkadian.

== Mesopotamia ==
=== Lower Mesopotamia ===
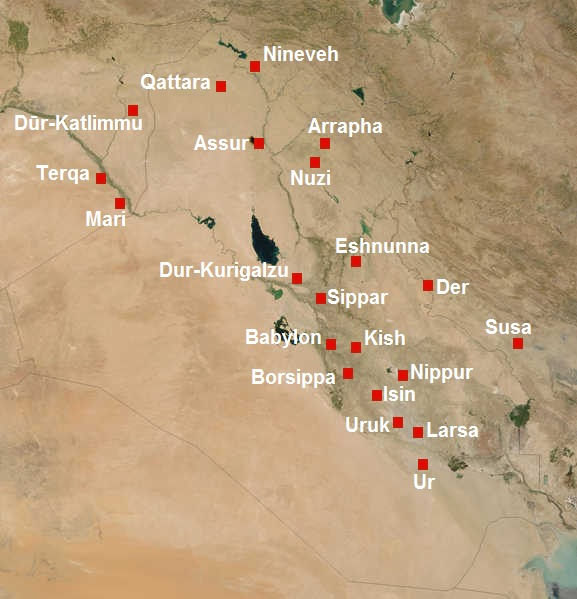
Map of Mesopotamian cities in modern-day Iraq, Syria and Iran.

Map of Mesopotamia.

(ordered from north to south)

- Eshnunna (Tell Asmar)
- Me-Turan (Tell Haddad and Tell al-Sib)
- Tell Yelkhi (Awal?)
- Tutub (Khafajah)
- Der (Tell Aqar)
- Sippar (Tell Abu Habbah)
- Sippar-Amnanum (Tell ed-Der)
- Tell Uqair (Urum?)
- Kutha (Tell Ibrahim)
- Jemdet Nasr (NI.RU)
- Kish (Tell Uheimir & Ingharra)
- Babylon (Hillah)
- Borsippa (Birs Nimrud)
- Malgium (Tulūl al-Fāj / Tell Yassir)
- Mashkan-shapir (Tell Abu Duwari)
- Dilbat (Tell ed-Duleim)
- Nippur (Afak)
- Marad (Tell Wannat es-Sadum)
- Adab (Tell Bismaya)
- Isin (Ishan al-Bahriyat)
- Kisurra (Tell Abu Hatab)
- Shuruppak (Tell Fara)
- Karkar (Tell Ĝidr?)
- Bad-tibira (Tell al-Madineh?)
- Zabalam (Tell Ibzeikh)
- Umma (Umm al-Aqarib, Tell Jokha)
- Girsu (Tello or Telloh)
- Lagash (Tell al-Hiba)
- Tell Zurghul (Nigin)
- Uruk (Warka)
- Larsa (Tell as-Senkereh)
- Pašime (Tell Abu Sheeja)
- Tell Khaiber
- Tell al-Wilayah (Irisaĝrig?)
- Tulul al-Baqarat (Kesh?)
- Ur (Tell al-Muqayyar)
- Tell al-Lahm (Dur-Iakin?, Kisik?, Kuara???)
- Eridu (Tell Abu Shahrain)
- Tell al-'Ubaid (Nutur?)
- Akshak
- Akkad

=== Upper Mesopotamia ===
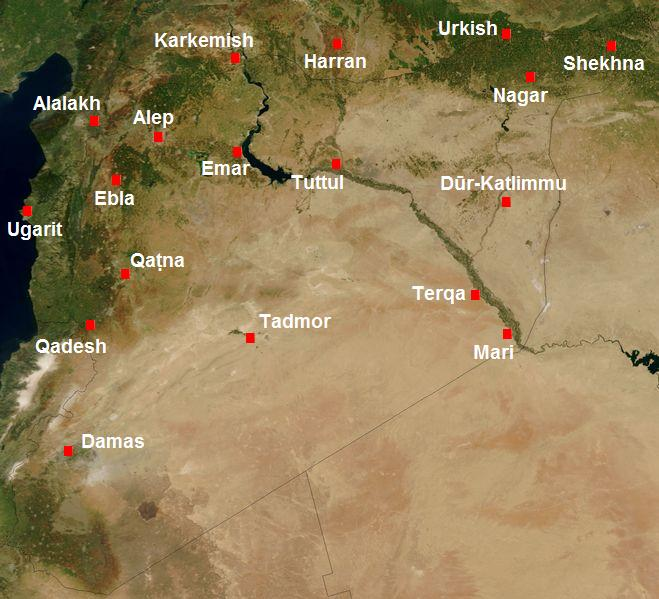
Map of Syria in the second millennium BC

(ordered from north to south)

- Urfa
- Shanidar cave
- Urkesh (Urkish) (Tell Mozan)
- Tell Leilan (Shekhna, Shubat-Enlil)
- Tell Halaf
- Tell Arbid
- Harran
- Chagar Bazar
- Mardaman (Bassetki)
- Kahat (Tell Barri)
- Tell Fekheriye (Washukanni?)
- Hadatu (Arslan Tash)
- Carchemish (Djerabis)
- Til Barsip (Tell Ahmar)
- Tell Chuera
- Al-Rawda
- Nabada (Tell Beydar)
- Nagar (Tell Brak)
- Hamazi
- Yarim Tepe
- Telul eth-Thalathat
- Tepe Gawra
- Tell Arpachiyah (Tepe Reshwa)
- Tell Maghzaliyah
- Shibaniba (Tell Billa)
- Tarbiṣu (Sherif Khan)
- Nineveh (Ninua)
- Qatara or Karana (Tell al-Rimah)
- Tell Hamoukar
- Tell al-Hawa (Razama?)
- Dur Sharrukin (Khorsabad)
- Tell Shemshara (Shusharra)
- Bestansur
- Tell Bazmusian
- Erbil (Urbilim, Arba-Ilu)
- Kurd Qaburstan (Qabra?)
- Qasr Shemamok (Kilizu/Kilizi/Kakzu)
- Qal'at Jarmo
- Tell Taya
- Tell Hassuna
- Balawat (Imgur-Enlil)
- Tell es-Sweyhat
- Tell Hadidi (Azu)
- Mumbaqat (Tall Munbāqa, Ekalte)
- Nimrud
- Emar (Tell Meskene)
- Tall Bazi (Baṣīru, Armanum?)
- Kar-Tukulti-Ninurta
- Assur
- Ekallatum
- Nuzi (Yorghan Tepe, Gasur)
- Tell al-Fakhar (Kurruhanni?)
- Tell Taban (Ṭābetu, Ṭābatum)
- Terqa (Tell Ashara)
- Doura Europos
- Mari (Tell Hariri)
- Tuttul (Tell Bi'a)
- Haradum (Khirbet ed-Diniyeh)
- Tell es-Sawwan
- Nerebtum or Kiti (Tell Ishchali)
- Tell Agrab
- Dur-Kurigalzu (Aqar Quf)
- Shaduppum (Tell Harmal)
- Tell al-Dhiba'i
- Tell Muhammad
- Seleucia
- Ctesiphon (Taq Kisra)
- Zenobia (Halabiye)
- Hatra
- Idu
- Rabana-Merquly (Natounia?)

== Iran ==
- Ecbatana (Hamadan?)
- Behistun
- Godin Tepe
- Rey (Rhages, Europos, Shahr-e-Ray, Arsacia)
- Chogha Mish
- Chogha Gavaneh
- Tepe Sialk
- Susa (Shush, Shushan)
- Kabnak (Haft Tepe)
- Dur Untash (Chogha Zanbil)
- Shahr-e Sukhteh
- Pasargadae (Pasargad, Pasargadai)
- Naqsh-e Rustam
- Estakhr (Istakhr)
- Persepolis (Parsa)
- Tall-i Bakun
- Anshan (Tall-i Malyan or Tepe Malyan)
- Konar Sandal
- Tepe Yahya
- Teppe Hasanlu
- Khaydalu
- Kermanshah
- Isfahan (Aspadana)
- Tabriz
- Shahdad
- Marlik
- Chogha Bonut
- Ganj Dareh
- Ali Kosh
- Geoy Tepe
- Baba Jan Tepe
- Shah Tepe
- Hajji Firuz Tepe
- Kul Tepe
- Shir Ashian Tepe
- Tepe Hissar
- Tepe Sofalin
- Tureng Tepe
- Yarim Tepe
- Vahrkana (Gorgan)
- Narezzash (Neyriz)
- Zranka (Dahan-e Gholaman)
- Tepe Giyan
- Hashtgerd
- Bastam
- Ganzak

== Anatolia ==
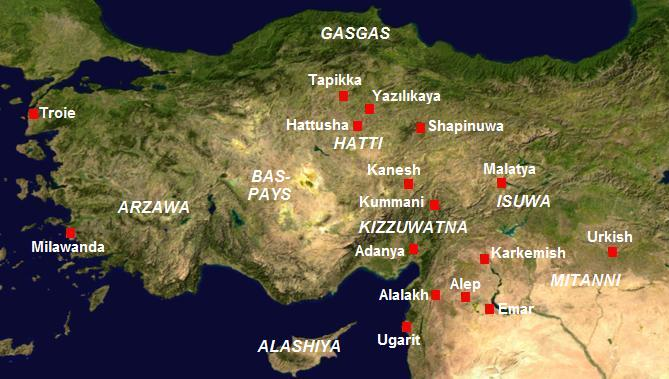
Settlements of Bronze Age Anatolia, based on Hittite records.

(ordered from north to south)

- İnandıktepe
- Miletus
- Sfard (Sardis)
- Nicaea
- Sapinuwa
- Yazilikaya
- Alaca Höyük
- Maşat Höyük
- Alishar Hüyük
- Hattusa
- Ilios (Wilusa, Ilion, Troas, Troy)
- Kanesh (Nesa, Kültepe)
- Arslantepe (Malatya)
- Çayönü (Diyarbakir)
- Sam'al (Zincirli Höyük)
- Çatalhöyük
- Beycesultan
- Karatepe
- Tushhan (Ziyaret Tepe)
- Üçtepe Höyük (Šināmum/Sinābu?, Tušḫan?)
- Adana
- Tarsus
- Zephyrion (Mersin)
- Gözlükule
- Titris Hoyuk
- Tilmen Hoyuk
- Sultantepe
- Attalia (Antalya)

== Syria-Palestine ==
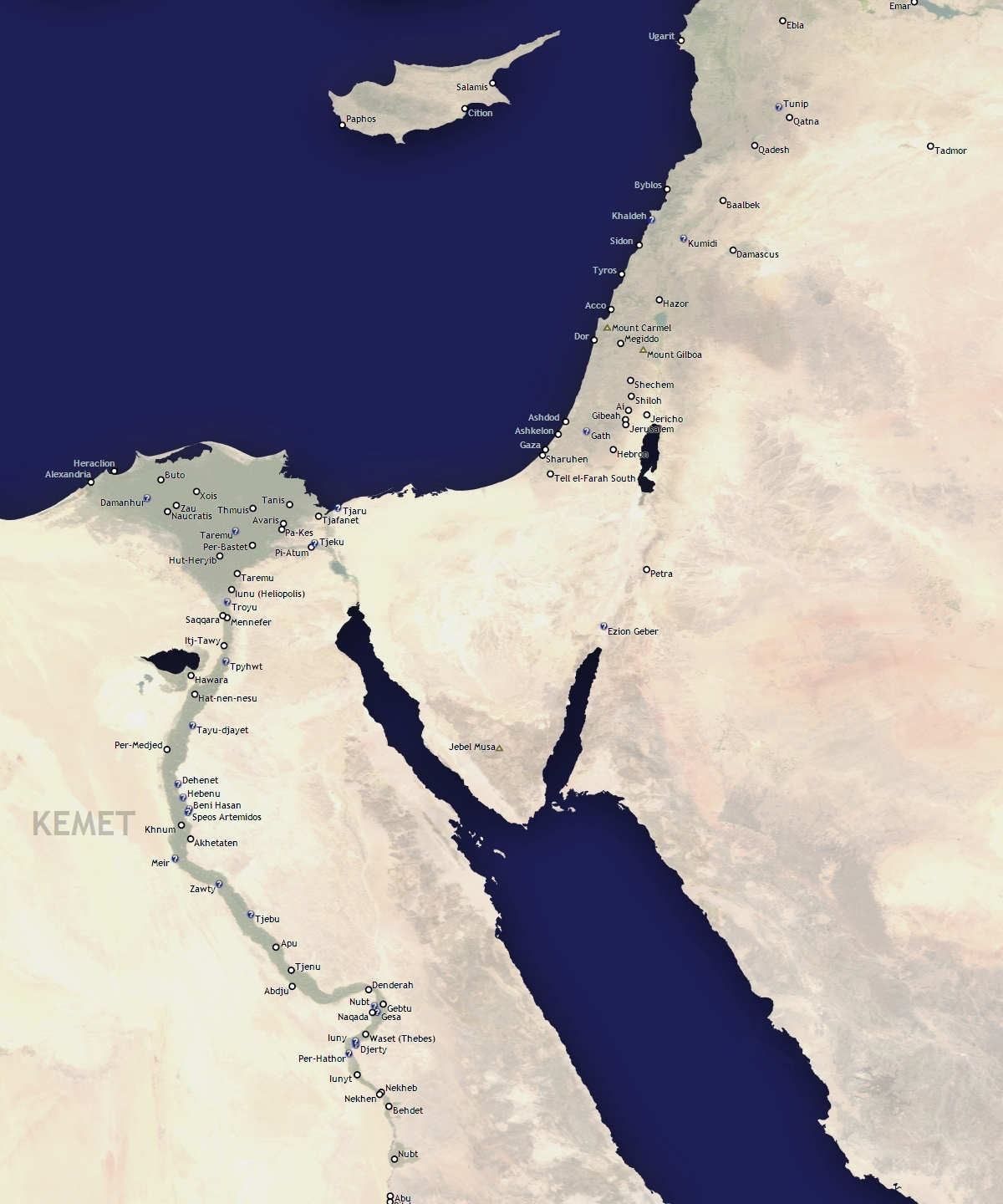

- Abel-beth-maachah
- Acre
- Adoraim (Adora, Dura)
- Afqa (Afeka)
- Alalakh (Alakhtum, Tell Atchana)
- Aleppo (Halab, Ha-Lam, Yamhad)
- Al-Rastan (Arethusa)
- Antioch (Antakiya)
- Apamea (Afamiya)
- Aphek (Antipatris, Tell Afik)
- Arad (Arad Rabbah?; Tel Arad)
- Arpad (Tell Rifaat)
- Arqa (Arkat, Irqata)
- Arwad (Aradus, Arvad, Arphad, Ruad Island)
- Ashdod
- Ashkelon
- Azekah
- Baalbek (Heliopolis)
- Batroun (Botrys)
- Banias
- Beersheba
- Beirut (Berytus)
- Beth Shean
- Bet Shemesh
- Bethel
- Bethsaida
- Bethlehem
- Bosra
- Byblos (Gubla, Kepen)
- Dan, former Laish (Tel Dan, Tell el-Qadi)
- Damascus (Dimasqu)
- Deir Alla (Pethor?)
- Dhiban (Dibon)
- Dor (D-jr, Dora)
- Dura-Europos (Dur)
- Ebla (Tell Mardikh)
- Edessa (Ar-Ruha, Urfa)
- Ein Gedi (Hazazon-tamar, Tel Goren)
- En Esur
- Enfeh (Ampi)
- Ekron (Tel Miqne, Khirbet el-Muqanna)
- Et-Tell (Ai?)
- Gath (Tell es-Safi?)
- Gaza
- Gezer
- Gibeah (Tell el-Ful?)
- Hama (Hamath, Epiphania)
- Harran (Carrhae, Hellenopolis)
- Hazor
- Hebron
- Hermel
- Homs (Emesa)
- Jawa
- Jericho (Ariha)
- Jerusalem (Jebus, City of David)
- Jezreel
- Kadesh (Syria) (Tell Nebi Mend)
- Karnaim (Ashteroth Karnaim)
- Kedesh (Qadesh in Galilee)
- Khirbet Kerak (Al-Sinnabra)
- Khirbet el-Qom (Makkedah/Maqqedah)
- Khirbet Qeiyafa (Sha'arayim? / Neta'im?)
- Kinneret (Tel Kinrot, Tell el-Oreimeh)
- Kumidi (Kamid el-Loz)
- Lachish (Tel Lachish, Tell ed-Duweir)
- Manbij (Manbug, Mabog, Bambyce, Hierapolis)
- Megiddo (Tel Megiddo, Tell el-Mutesellim)
- Petra (Raqmu)
- Qatna (Tell Mishrifeh)
- Rabbath Ammon (Philadelphia)
- Tel Rehov (Rehov?)
- Samaria (Shomron, Sebastie)
- Sam'al
- Sarepta (Sarafand)
- Sharuhen (Tell el-Far'ah (South))?, Tell el-'Ajjul?, Tel Haror?)
- Shiloh
- Saida (Sidon)
- Sumur (Sumuru, Simirra)
- Tadmor (Palmyra)
- Tall Zira'a
- Tel Yarmuth
- Tell Abu al-Kharaz (Jabesh-Gilead?)
- Tell Afis (Hazrek)
- Tell Ashtara (Ashteroth Karnaim)
- Tell Balata (Shechem)
- Tell Beit Mirsim
- Tel Burna
- Tell el-Burak
- Tell el-Hesi (Eglon?)
- Tell en-Nasbeh (Mizpah in Benjamin?)
- Tell es-Sakan
- Tel Kabri (one of several cities called Rehob)
- Tell Kazel
- Tell Qaramel
- Tell Qarqur (Qarqar?)
- Tell Tayinat (Kinalua?)
- Tell Tweini (Gibala?)
- Tel Yokneam (Yokneam, "'En-qn'mu")
- Tirzah (Tell el-Farah North)
- Tripoli (Tripolis)
- Tulul adh-Dhahab (Mahanaim? Penuel?)
- Tyre (Tylos)
- Ugarit (Ras Shamra)
- Umm el-Marra
- Zahiran ("Sahiri")
- Zoara (Zoar, Bela)

== Arabian Peninsula ==
- Al Ain
- Al-Ashoosh
- Awwam
- Barran
- Bakkah (Mecca)
- Barbar Temple
- Bidaa Bint Saud
- Al Bithnah
- Dalma
- Al Da'asa
- Dedan (Al-'Ula)
- Dibba
- Dumat Al-Jandal (Adummatu)
- Ed-Dur
- Failaka
- Gerrha
- Ḥaram
- Hili Archaeological Park
- Ibri
- Izki
- Jeddah
- Jubbah
- Julfar
- Kalba
- Kush
- Al-Kharj
- Khaybar
- Khor Rori (Sumhuram)
- Kaminahu (Kamna)
- Lihyan
- Mada'in Saleh (Al-Hijr, el Hijr, and Hegra)
- Al Madam
- Al-Magar
- Ma'rib
- Maṣna'at Māriya
- Mleiha
- Muweilah
- Najran
- Nashan
- Nashaq
- Nizwa
- Petra
- Qatif
- Qarnawu
- Qaryat al-Faw (Dhat al-Jnan)
- Qal'at al-Bahrain
- Sakakah
- Sanaa
- Ṣirwāḥ
- Shabwa
- Shimal
- Sohar
- As-Subiya
- Tarim, Yemen
- Tayma (Tema)
- Tell Abraq
- Thula
- Tarout
- Umm Al Nar
- Yathrib (Medina)

== Cyprus ==
- Enkomi
- Idalion
- Kition
- Kourion (Koύριov, Curium)

== Nubia ==
- Jebel Barkal
- Kerma
- Meroë
- Napata

== Horn of Africa ==
- Adulis
- Aksum (Axum)
- Keskese
- Matara
- Qohaito
- Sembel
- Yeha

== See also ==
- City-state
- Sumerian King List
- Historical urban community sizes
- Short chronology timeline
- List of oldest continuously inhabited cities
- Ancient towns in Saudi Arabia
- List of Ancient Settlements in the UAE
- List of largest metropolitan areas of the Middle East
- List of modern names for biblical place names
