= Tell Banat =

Syrian archaeological site

- تل بنات (Arabic)
- Location within Syria
- 36°27′0″N 38°16′59.88″E
- Type: Tell
- Location: Syria
- Region: Aleppo Governorate

Tell Banat is an archaeological site in northern Syria and is considered the world's oldest war memorial.

== History ==
Tell Banat was constructed by an ancient Mesopotamian civilization during the 3rd millennium BC, in the early Bronze Age. The burial findings at the site are considered unique within Upper Mesopotamia. Excavations uncovered two primary mounds—one located within the small settlement of Tal Banat, and the other, known as Tell Banat North, situated outside the settlement boundaries.

Tell Banat North came to be referred to as "The White Monument" due to its coating of lime-rich mud and gypsum. Beneath this outer layer, archaeologists discovered an older and distinctively corrugated construction, unlike any previously found in the region.

== Research ==
Excavations at the site were halted when the area was submerged following the construction of the Tishrin Dam on the Euphrates River in the 1990s. Unfortunately, part of the excavated material was later lost when IS destroyed a storage facility housing some of the finds.

The University of Toronto, which conducted excavations at the site between 1988 and 1999 as part of the Tall Bazi project, reopened its research based on surviving materials dated to around 2450 BC.
