= Idu (city) =

Ancient town in Iraq

Sātu Qalā
- Idu
- Location within Iraq Location within Near East
- 35°53′N 44°42′E
- Type: tell
- Location: Erbil Governorate, Iraq
- Region: Mesopotamia

Site notes
- Excavation dates: 2011-2013
- Archaeologists: Diederik Meijer, Wilfred van Soldt

Idu, also Idum (Sātu Qalā) was an ancient Near Eastern town in the Erbil Governorate in the Kurdistan region of Iraq, on the right bank of the Lower Zab. It was occupied primarily in the Late Bronze Age and Iron Age periods, though it remained occupied until the Middle Islamic period. It lies 70 kilometers southeast of modern Erbil and 50 kilometers northeast of modern Kirkuk.

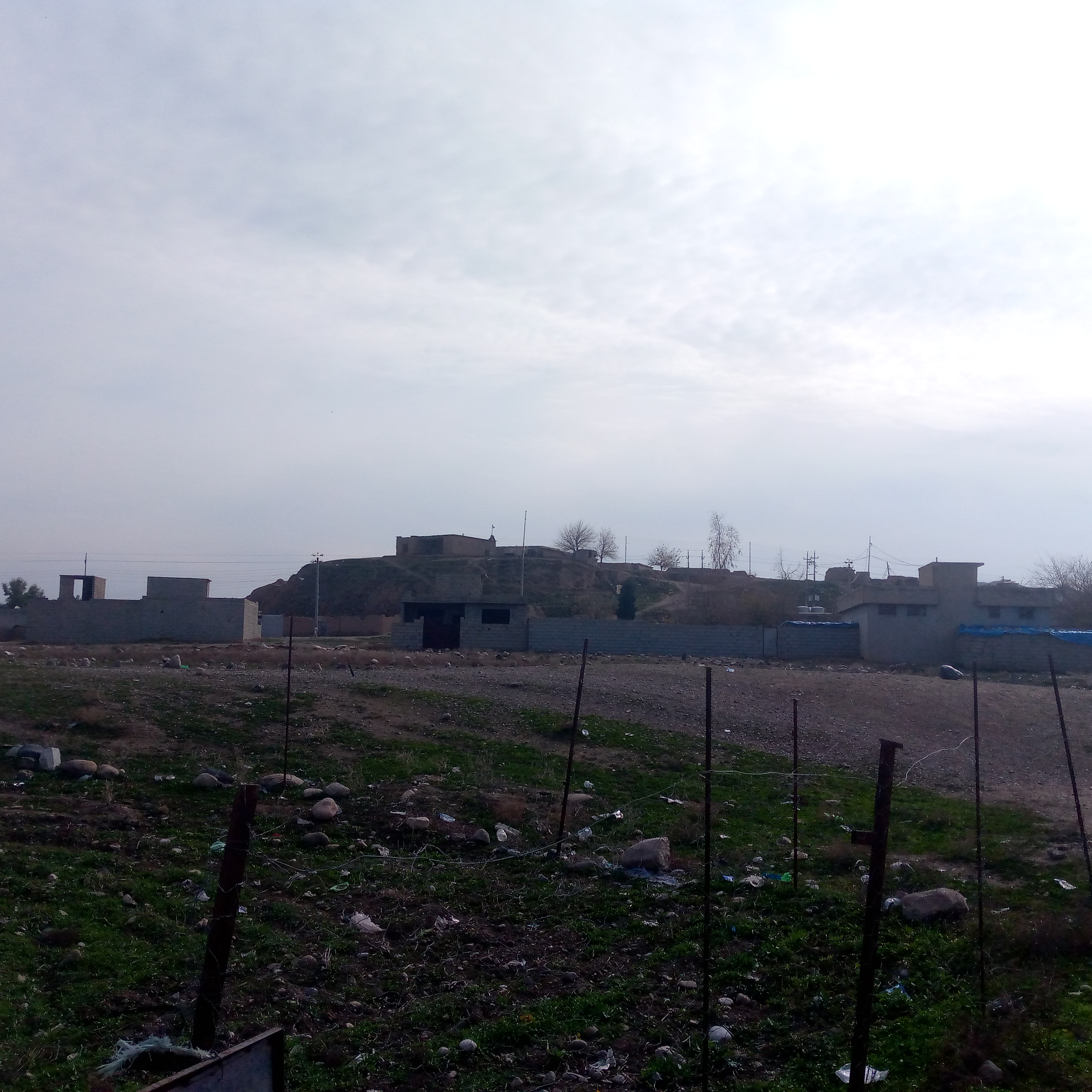
Sātu Qalā

== History ==
Surface pottery fragments indicated some level of occupation occurred in the Early Bronze and Middle Bronze ages. The site was definitively occupied in the Late Bronze age Middle Assyrian period, in the later half of the 2nd millennium BC, based on an inscribed brick, an excavated palace, and a cylinder seal, when it was the capital of Idu province. After the fall of the Middle Assyrian Empire the city became independent for several centuries, with known rules named Abbizeri, Bal’ilanu and Eristenu, and Baiuri. An inscribed brick of the latter read "Bajaru (Ba’auri), King of the Land Idu, son of Edima". Idu then became part of the Neo-Assyrian Empire in its early days. It later gained independence and survived to later become part of the Achaemenid, Seleucid, Parthian, and Sassanians empires. The site was occupied until the Middle Islamic period.

== Archaeology ==
The site consists of a main mound 170 meters by 100 meters in area with a height about 10 meters above the plain. The south slope is marked by a side branch of the Lower Zab river. A modern village covers much of the top and locals have mined the northern slope for topsoil. It was visited by the excavators during a survey of the region in 2006. During that visit a local turned over several inscribed bricks from the Middle Assyrian period bearing the town name, a royal name, and reference to the building of a palace wall. Excavations were conducted in 2010 and 2011 involving researchers Diederik Meijer and Wilfred van Soldt from Leiden University, Leipzig University and Salahaddin University. In summer 2012 they were joined by a team of archaeologists from the Penn Museum. Four squares were opened, Area A on the west slope, Area B on the northeast slope, Area C on the eastern slope, and Area D on the southern slope. In Area A a serpentine 9th century BC cylinder seal was found. Finds included 41 inscribed objects in the Assyrian dialect of Akkadian, none in situ and most were bricks originating in an embankment wall of the palace. All of the inscribed bricks were of local rulers except for one Neo-Assyrian fragment "Palace of Aššurnaṣirpal, king of the land of Aššur …".

"Palace of Abbi-zēri, king of the land of the city of Idu, son of Šara…ni, also king of the land of the city of Idu. The embankment wall of the palace of Abbi-zēri.

Additionally, some inscribed items from the site are held in museums, three at the Suleimaniya Museum, four at the Museum of the Directorate of Antiquities in Koya, and one at the Iraq Museum in Baghdad. Further work awaits agreement with the locals of town of Sātu Qalā, which Idu sits beneath.

== See also ==
- Cities of the ancient Near East
