= Al-Rawda (tell) =

- الروضة (Arabic)
- Location within Syria
- 35.181°N 37.633°E
- Type: settlement
- Periods: Early Bronze Age
- Location: Syria
- Region: Hama Governorate

History
- Built: c. 2400–2100 BC

Site notes
- Material: clay, limestone
- Height: 2 metres (6 ft 7 in)
- Area: 11 hectares (27 acres), 15–16 hectares (37–40 acres) (with city walls), 4 hectares (9.9 acres) (outer town)
- Excavation dates: 2002–ongoing
- Archaeologists: C. Castel, N. Awad
- Condition: ruins
- Management: Directorate-General of Antiquities and Museums
- Public access: Yes

Al-Rawda (Arabic: الروضة) is a tell, or archaeological settlement mound, in the Syrian steppe, east of Hama. It was a large urban site with city walls and several temples, occupied in the late Early Bronze Age, between 2400–2000 BC. A French–Syrian mission has been excavating the site since 2002.

== The site and its environment ==
Al-Rawda is located 80 kilometres (50 mi) east of Hama and 70 km from ancient Qatna. Both now and in the past, the area received less than 200 millimetres (7.9 in) of rainfall per year, which means that reliable agriculture without irrigation is impossible. The survey of the microregion around Al-Rawda revealed that the site is located in a fayda, a depression that collects runoff water from a wide region, and next to a wadi. Al-Rawda was surrounded by hydrological installations intended to harness runoff water for irrigation. The site itself is an almost circular tell with a maximum height of 2 metres (6.6 ft).

== History ==
=== Early Bronze Age ===
The site was occupied for a relatively short period during the late third millennium BC, roughly coinciding with the Early Bronze IIIB (c. 2500-2350 BCE), Early Bronze IVA (c. 2350-2150 BCE) and Early Bronze IVB (c. 2150-2000 BCE) periods. From 2500 BCE, climate became drier with major drought events around 2200-2150 (4.2 ka event) and 2020 BCE. It was founded between 2560 and 2430 BC and finally abandoned in circa 2000 BC.

==== Settlement ====
The magnetometric survey revealed a circular street pattern with streets radiating away from the centre of the site. Both the temple and the circular street pattern find parallels in Tell Chuera, located in a similar environment to the northeast of Al-Rawda. The settlement occupies a total of 15–16 hectares (37–40 acres) with the circular city walls enclosing 11 hectares (27 acres) and an outer town of 4 hectares (9.9 acres). The southwestern part of the site is occupied by modern houses.

==== Fortification ====
The city was defended by a double rampart built of mudbricks on a stone foundation and two ditches. The town was accessible through five gates.

==== Trade ====
The urban site indicates that it was a part of several trade networks of different scales. Al-Rawda probably served as a stopping place for caravans that crossed the plateau between the Euphrates valley and the region of Qatna (70 km). It played a major part in the development of extensive pastoralism and wool production at the end of the third millennium BC.

- Nearby centers Ebla, Hama and Qatna.

==== Religion ====
The site served as a religious center for the region, with a large sanctuary that was likely dedicated to the city's patron god, At least three temples were identified, of which one has been excavated. The largest temple excavated had an entrance with a columned front porch, a square cella and faces a 50 metres (160 ft) long sacred enclosure to the outside. Offerings that were found in this temple include alabaster from Egypt, lapis lazuli from Afghanistan and agate from India.

==== The necropolis ====
The necropolis is situated close to the site but outside the agricultural zone. Among the 97 tombs found, 54 were shaft tombs –intended for multiple burials and cut into the limestone crust of the plateau, 25 were simple cist tombs and 17 were circle tombs.

== Excavations ==
Al-Rawda was discovered in 1996 during an archaeological survey of the region east of Hama. Following this survey, a more intensive survey project was initiated focusing on a microregion of 100 square kilometres (39 sq mi) centred on Al-Rawda. Excavations at the site itself started in 2002 and are carried out by a French–Syrian mission. The excavations have focused on the circular walls, the northern gate of the town, the temple and the nearby necropolis. In addition to the excavations, a magnetometric prospection, a method that allows the detection of walls in the ground without excavating them, was carried out in the area within the city walls in 2003. Work continued at least through 2010. The Al-Rawda project is sponsored by the French National Centre for Scientific Research (CNRS) and the Syrian Directorate-General of Antiquities and Museums and co-directed by Corinne Castel and Nazir Awad.

== See also ==
- Cities of the ancient Near East
