= Tell al-Wilayah =

Archaeological site in Iraq

- Location within Iraq
- 32°18′45″N 45°39′39″E
- Periods: Ubaid period, Uruk period, Early Dynastic period, Akkad period, Ur III period

Site notes
- Excavation dates: 1958, 1999-2002, 2007
- Archaeologists: Tariq Madhlum, Aeid Al-Taei

Tell al-Wilayah (also Tell al-Wilaya) is an archaeological site in the Wasit Governorate of eastern Iraq. Due to looting, especially after 2003, this site has suffered severe damage, multiple levels of occupation have been extensively damaged. It is located around 20 km southwest of the modern city of Kut, several kilometers east of Tell Waresh 2, and 6 kilometers southwest of Tulul al-Baqarat. It has been proposed that the tutelary deities of the site were either the god Nergal or a local god Aški, and the goddess Mamma/Mammïtum.

== History ==
The site was occupied beginning in the Early Dynastic period extending into the Akkadian and Ur III periods. It has been suggested as the location of Kesh, now thought to be at Tulul al-Baqarat. It has also been proposed as the site of Irisaĝrig. The lost city of Larak has also been proposed. As has Anzagar.

== Archaeology ==
There were two mounds. The main mound Tell al-Wilayah I covered 64 hectares with a height of 5 meters. Tell al-Wilayah II, about 500 meters to the south, covered about 4.5 hectares and rose to about 5 meters above the plain.

Iraqi archaeologists led by Tariq Madhlum worked the site in 1958. A large Akkadian Empire period building was found on the western edge of the mound. Twenty two degraded whole and partial cuneiform tablets of the Old Akkadian (3) and Ur III periods (19) were found in robber holes, discarded by looters. Also found were two Old Akkadian clay jar sealings, an ivory figurine, terracotta plaques depicting naked females clasping their breasts, and two Ur III bricks, of Shu-Shin and Shulgi. An Early Dynastic palace was found at the extreme northwest corner (Area III) of the main mound, constructed with plano-convex bricks. In the center of the mound (in Area II) a large Akkadian Empire period plano-convex building was found. A late Early Dynastic period date for the building has also been suggested and Ur III period cuneiform tablets were found in a later phase. In response to major looting, the Iraqi State Board of Antiquities and Heritage conducted excavations in 1999, 2000, 2001, 2002, and 2007. Five Old Akkadian cuneiform tablets were found in the first two seasons. In the 2002 season, directed by Aeid Al-Taei, "over 50 cuneiform tablets, 61 stamp and cylinder seals, bronze weapons, ceramics, and important architectural remains dating primarily to the Early Dynastic and Akkadian periods" were found. Four tablets were lost in the looting of the Iraq Museum in Baghdad. More brick inscriptions of Shu-Shin "Šu-Sîn, mighty king, king of Ur, king of the four quarters" and Shulgi "Šulgi, mighty man, king of Ur, king of the four quarters" were also found.

A number of items illegally excavated from Tell al-Wilayah have appeared on the antiquities market. This likely includes two archives of Ur III merchant texts called the Turam-ilï Archive and the SI.A-a Archive.

== See also ==
- Cities of the ancient Near East
- Tulul al-Baqarat
