= Kesh (Sumer) =

Ancient Sumerian city

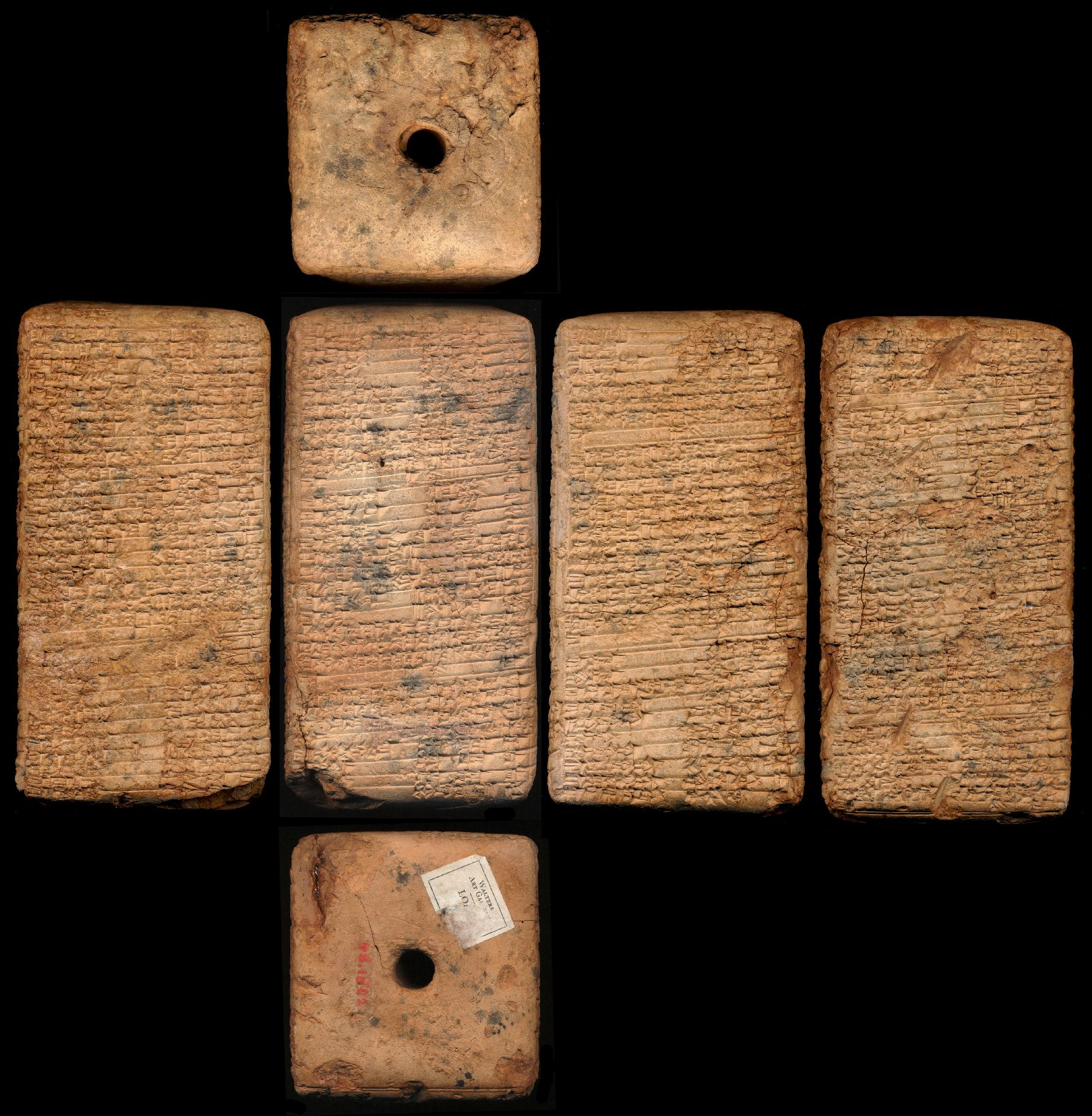
Sumerian hymn to the temple at Kesh

Kesh (Keš or Keši) was an ancient Sumerian city and religious site, whose patron goddess was Ninhursag. It was included on the "city seals" found at Jemdat Nasr. These seals sparked the theory that a proposed Early Dynastic I period of cities surrounding Nippur, known as the Kengir League, was in control of Sumer at that time. Its location is uncertain; some of the possible sites put forth include Al-Ubaid, near Ur, or Tell al-Wilayah near Adab or Abu Salabikh or even Tell Jidr though the consensus is now with Tell al-Wilayah or Tulul al-Baqarat. The city is known to be located near to the ancient city of Irisaĝrig and was under the control of that city. According to a riddle from Early Dynastic times, there was a Kesh Canal, which Adab was on.

It has been suggested that Mesilim, traditionally considered "King of Kish" was actually a ruler of Kesh, based on epigraphic reasons and by the fact that he called himself "beloved son of Ninharsag".

== Historical sources ==
A number of personal names from the Early Dynastic period include the city of Kesh. An example was Me-Kèš^{ki} ie "The divine forces of Kesh".

In the prologue of the Code of Hammurabi it states "the one whom the sage, Mama brought to perfection; who laid out the plans for Kesh" where Mama referred to the goddess Ninhursag.

The third year name of Rim-Sîn II (c. 1700 BC), ruler of Larsa, reads "Year in which Ninmah raised greatly in the Kesz temple, the foundation of heaven and earth, (Rim-Sin) to kingship over the land, (king) having no enemy, no hostile (king), opposing him in all foreign lands." where Ninmah is another name for Ninhursag. In a letter to Amurrum-tillati, Rim-Sin II declares "In order to bring light to Yamutbalum and to gather its scattered people, the great gods established the foundations of my throne in Keš, the city of my creatress" suggesting that his throne, and capital, were in Kesh. According to one statue inscription, Samsu-iluna, ruler of Babylon, destroyed Kesh and "Ninhursag’s Gate", and possibly executed Rim-Sin II there after suppressing his revolt.

Kesh is mentioned on the Bassetki Statue of Naram-Sin.

"Naram-Sin, the mighty, king of Agade, when the four quarters together revolted against him, through the love which the goddess Astar showed him, he was victorious in nine battles in one in 1 year, and the kings whom they (the rebels[?]) had raised (against him), he captured. In view of the fact that he protected the foundations of his city from danger, (the citizens of his city requested from Astar in Eanna, Enlil in Nippur, Dagan in Tuttul, Ninhursag in Kes, Ea in Eridu, Sin in Ur, Samas in Sippar, (and) Nergal in Kutha, that (Naram-Sin) be (made) the god of their city, and they built within Agade a temple (dedicated) to him. As for the one who removes this inscription, may the gods Samas, Astar, Nergal, the bailiff of the king, namely all those gods (mentioned above) tear out his foundations and destroy his progeny."

== Temple Hymn ==
There is a famous Kesh temple hymn about Ninhursag's temple in Kesh (hur-saĝ gal), where she is called Nintud. The goddess Nisaba appears as the temple's caretaker and decision maker. A cuneiform tablet fragment of the Kesh Temple Hymn was found at Abu Salabikh.

Good house, built in a good place,

House Kesh, built in a good place, like a princely barge floating in the sky, like a holy barge set with seat and horns, like the boat of heaven, the lordly crown of the mountains, like a well-braced boat-cabin having moved off from the bank. House, roaring like an ox, bellowing like a breed bull

One of the Temple Hymns of Enheduanna, the daughter of Sargon of Akkad (c. 2334-2279 BC), is dedicated to Kesh as well, though it is shorter than the Early Dynastic composition:

"Towering Kesh. You are the image of heaven and earth. Like the mighty viper of the desert, you spread fear. House of Ninhursanga, you stand on a land of wrath. Glorious Kesh: your heart is deep, your form is huge. Great lion . . . the upland, roaming through the wild. Great mountain, brought here by holy incantations. Your heart is dusk, moon light cannot enter you. The Lady of Birth has given you beauty. House of Kesh: your brickwork is your birthing. Your terrace is a crown of lapis lazuli: your frame is your creation. Your lady is the lady who imposes silence. The great good queen of heaven.When she speaks, heaven shakes. When she opens her mouth, storms roar. Ninhursanga, Enlil’s sister, has built a home in your holy court, House of Kesh, and has taken her seat upon your throne. Thirteen lines. House of Ninhursanga in Kesh."

== Location ==
Robert D. Biggs suggested Kesh could have just been a variation in the spelling of Kish. From inscriptions it is known that Adab was on the Kesh Canal. More recently it has been suggested that Kesh is located at Tulul al-Baqarat.

== See also ==
- Cities of the ancient Near East
- Chronology of the ancient Near East
