= Belassunu =

Belassunu (fl. c. 1780–1770 BC) was a princess of Karana (modern day Tell al-Rimah).

== History ==
Belassunu was the daughter of Samu-addu, King of Karana, perhaps by his wife Ama-duga, and she was sister to Queen Iltani, wife of the usurper King Aqba-Hammu. Details of Belassunu's life are known from surviving letters from the former royal archive at Tell-el-Rimah. She was the wife of Abdu-Suri to whom she bore children. This marriage appears to have been unhappy, as she was ill-treated by her husband, as recorded in letters preserved as clay tablets discovered by archaeologists amongst the Iltani archive. This mistreatment was such that she did not wish to live with her husband, and requested to move to the court of her brother in law. The assertion that Belassunu had been a secondary wife to Zimrilim, king of Mari has now been proved incorrect.

While residing in the city of Karana she was the recipient of royal rations of meat and oil, and she paid visits to the cities of Mari and Andarig. Eventually she retired to her father's court at Karana, being escorted there under the protection of her brother-in-law Aqba-Hammu.
