= Armanum =

City-state in the ancient Near East

Armanum (Armänum) was a city-state in the ancient Near East whose location is still not clear, but it is believed to be in the same general area as Mari and Ebla. It is mentioned in the texts from the Akkadian period, specifically by Naram-Sin of Akkad. But the Akkadians were active in this region even earlier.

There is a question of whether or not Armanum should be identified with Armi (Syria), that is also mentioned in many texts of this period. According to Adelheid Otto, it was "... generally accepted that Armanum should be identified with Armi/Armium of the Ebla texts ...", as opposed to the site of Aleppo.

Thus, some scholars believe that Armarnum was the 3rd Millenium BC name of Halpa (Aleppo).

Others also proposed that Hamran, Armuti(um) and Armanum are all names for the same city.

Other than Aleppo, another proposed site of Armanum is Tall Bazi in Syria.

Other scholars hold that Armi and Armium were two different towns in Ebla texts. Alfonso Archi disagreed with the identification of the Akkadian Armanum as a town that is known to be closely associated with Ebla, and often mentioned in Ebla texts.

Another analysis even supports the view that the Ebla referred to by Naram-Sin is not the same as the north Syrian Ebla, but another Transtigridian Ebla.

Armani (kingdom) may be yet another relevant area in this regard.

According to Matthiae (2020), the general historical overview of this area is as follows. First, Mari was defeated, still leaving Nagar (modern Tell Brak) as the main town in this area. Then Nagar was defeated by Akkad even before the time of Naram-Sin. After this, only Ebla and Armanum remained as significant centres, with Armanum being the more powerful. Matthiae thinks that Armanum was “almost certainly an alternative name” for Armi, at least during the period in question.

== Contemporary Sources ==
Armanum is mentioned in three contemporary sources:

Year Name of Naram-Sin - Rulers of that period named the years of their reign after major events that occurred in them, in this case "The year in which Naram-Sin conquered Armanum and tore d[own its] walls".

Royal Tutelary - Afterwards, Naram-Sin added "conqueror of Armanum and Ebla" to his tutelary. The phrase "Smiter of Armanum and Ebla." was found on a polychrome marble lamp and a slate plaque found at Telloh and a copper bowl found in Luristan.

Statue Inscription - A Old Babylonian tablet fragment (UET 1 275) was found in Ur which was a copy of an inscription on a statue of Naram-Sin which at that time stood in the Temple of Sin next to a statue of Sin-Eribam, a ruler of Larsa. It described the military campaign during which Armanum was defeated. The text begins:

"As to the fact that from immemorial time, since the creation of mankind, no king among kings had plundered Armanum and Ebla with the axes of Nergal, he (= Dagan) opened the path of Naram-Sin the mighty and gave him Armanum and Ebla. Further, he gave to him the Amanus, the Cedar Mountain, and the Upper Sea. ... Further, from the side of the Euphrates River as far as (the city of) Ulisum, he smote the people whom the god Dagan had given to him for the first time ... Thus says Naram-Sin, the mighty, king of the four quarters: 'The god Dagan gave me Armanum and Ebla and I captured Rid-Adad, king of Armanum."

It includes a detailed description of Armanum as being on a high hill with three concentric city walls:

"From the fortification wall to the great wall: 130 cubits is the height of the hill (and) 44 cubits is the height of the wall. From the quay wall to the fortification wall: 180 cubits is the height of the hill (and) 30 cubits is the height of the wall. Total: 404 cubits in height, from ground (level) to the top of the wall. He undermined the city Armanum. ..."

Tulul al-Baqarat text - In 2009, an Akkadian Period inscription fragment (IM 221139) was found during excavations by Iraqi archaeologists at Tulul al-Baqarat which also carried part of the Naram-Sin Syrian military campaign and permitted a more complete reconstruction including the capture of 80,508 prisoners. One passage reads

"[Indeed,] with the weapon of Dagan, the one who magnifies his kingship, Naram-Sin the mighty conquered Armanum and Ebla. (120–230) Moreover, from the edge of the Euphrates as far as Ulisum, he smote the peoples whom Dagan had newly bestowed upon him so that they (now) carry the (work) basket of Ilʾaba, his god and took full control of the Amanus, the cedar mountain."

== Later Sources ==
Gula-AN and the Seventeen Kings against Naram-Sin - In the much later literary composition "Gula-AN and the Seventeen Kings against Naram-Sin", among the list of rulers defeated by Naram-Sin is "Madagina, king of the Land of Armanum". The same source refers to a "Ris-Adad" as the king of Apisal while the contemporary historical record lists him as the king of Armanum that Naram-Sin defeated.

== See also ==
- Cities of the ancient Near East
