= Tell Taya =

Archaeological site in Iraq

- Location within Iraq
- 36°19′57.34″N 42°29′37.36″E
- Type: settlement
- Periods: Early Dynastic, Akkadian, Old Babylonian, Neo-Assyrian
- Location: Nineveh Province, Iraq

Site notes
- Area: 20 km^{2} (7.7 sq mi)
- Excavation dates: 1967–1969, 1972–1973
- Archaeologists: J.E. Reade

Tell Taya is an archaeological site at a tell (hill city) in Nineveh Province (Iraq). It was occupied from the third to the first millennia BC. Tell Taya lies about 20 kilometres (12 mi) southwest of Mosul and Nineveh.

The location controls a formerly rich agricultural area and an important trade route. The site of Tell al-Rimah is a few miles away.

== Archaeology ==
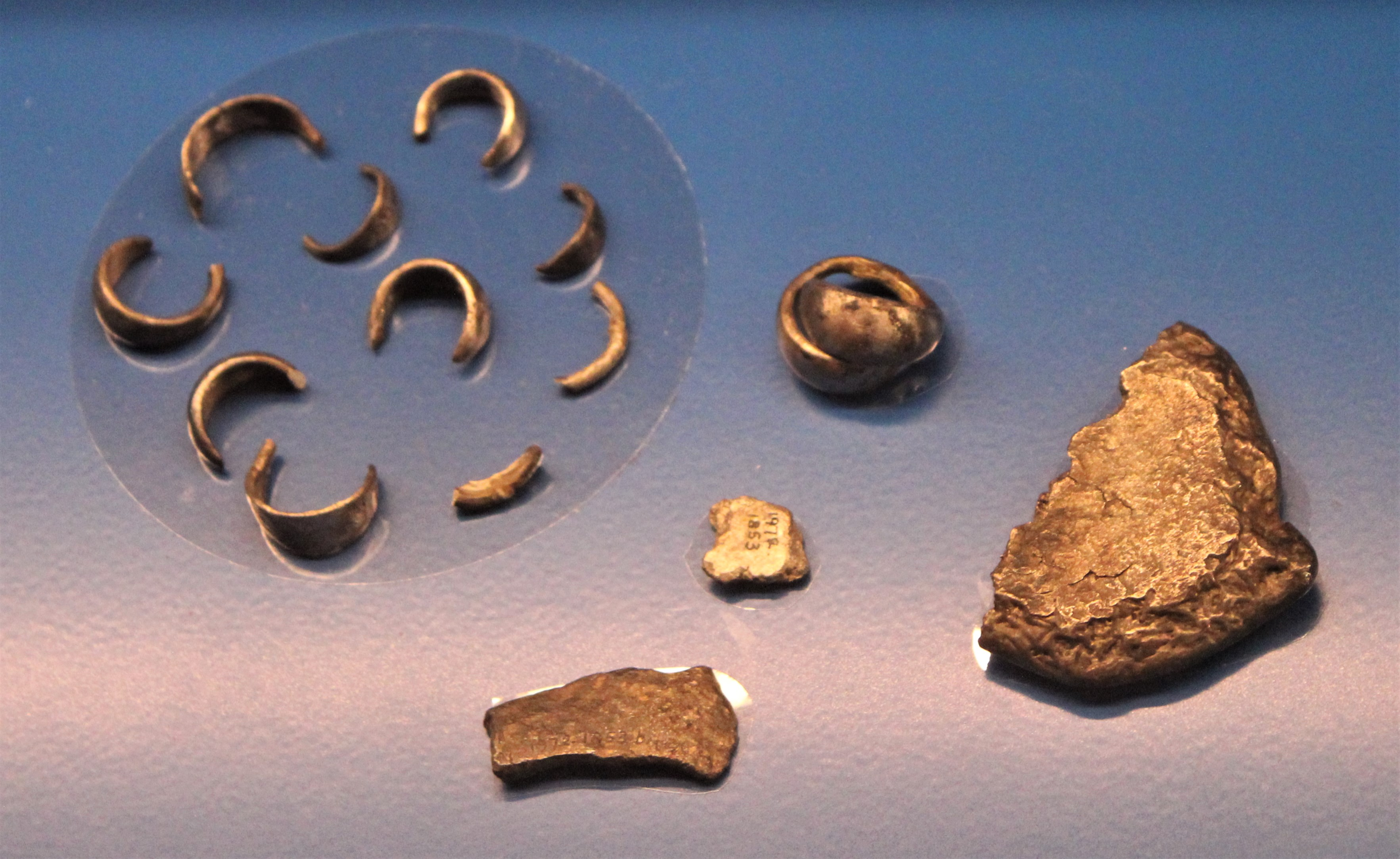
Silver hoard Tell Taya Ashmolean

The site covers about 20 square kilometres (7.7 sq mi) and the central tell is around 9 metres (30 ft) high. The town was surrounded by a fortification wall, though not a large one. It was first recorded by Seton Lloyd (as Tall Teir) in 1938 during his survey of the region. Tell Taya was excavated by a team from the British School of Archaeology in Iraq led by J. E. Reade in 1967–1969 and 1972–1973. There were nine levels of occupation on the main mound, with "each ended in a destruction, desertion, or fundamental change of plan". Numerous stone structures were investigated, and pottery, along with two cuneiform tablets, cylinder seals, and a Sassanian era stamp seal, were recovered in the 9 layers. Both simple administrative tablets, found in the Old Babylonian level, were sealed "Hasidim, son of Anzanum, servant of Samsi-Adad". Hasidim is known to have been an official of the Amorite ruler Shamshi-Adad I (c. 1808–1776 BC). One of the cylinder seals, made of terracotta, was quite unusual, containing only cuneiform writing which has not yet been deciphered. As part of the excavation four samples were radiocarbon dated, one from the Old Babylonian period (Level III), one the Ur III period (Level IV) and two from the Akkadian period (Level VIII). Among the faunal finds were ten cucurbit seeds (probably melon) found in the Old Akkadian level. This is the earliest example in the region.

== History ==
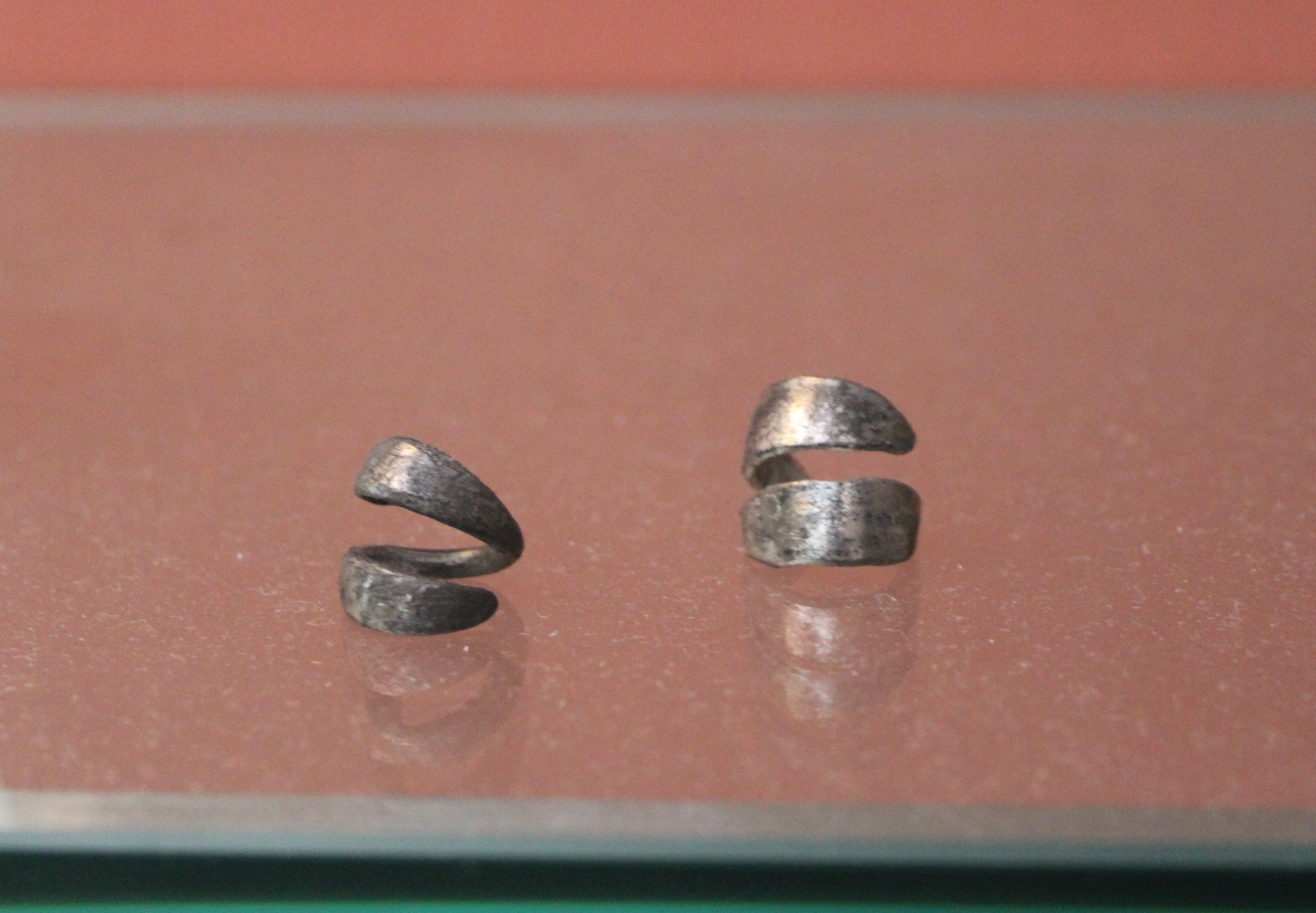
Silver rings used as currency - Tell Taya Akkadian period

While some Ubaid and Uruk sherds were found, the site was properly occupied on and off during the second half of the 3rd millennium, with some re-use in the Old Babylonian period and the Neo-Assyrian period. There is some evidence of Early Dynastic occupation, but major building at Tell Taya began around the time that the Akkadian Empire emerges.

== See also ==
- Cities of the ancient Near East
- Tell al-Rimah
- Tell Khoshi
