= Iltani =

Queen consort of Karana
- Tenure: c. 1750 BC
- King: Aqba-hammu
- Spouse: Aqba-hammu
- Father: Samu-Addu

Iltani (fl. c. 1750 BC), was the wife of the ruler Aqba-hammu. She was the daughter of king Samu-Addu of Karana. Her archive was discovered at the site Tell al-Rimah. The main group of tablets from the archive consisted of about 200 letters and administrative records, which directly concern the queen.

The letters tell us that Queen Iltani worked hard at running the palace industries, in particular the textiles and food, and had to meet her husband’s frequent, urgent demands for goods and personnel. She had to deal with many letters from individuals asking for help or resources, and she was concerned with her own health, querulous and indignant. Iltani’s work as overseer of the textile business in the palace of Rimah is well documented in the archive. The “department of Iltani,” as the business was called, employed 15 women and 10 men. Iltani was also involved in the metal trade; she personally received copper from her male subordinate.

Belassunu was either the sister or daughter of Iltani.

== Naditu priests named Iltani ==
There were at least three naditu priestesses named Iltani: the sister of Hammurabi, the daughter of Sin-muballit, and the sister of Ammi-Ditana.

The city and cloister of Sippar are well documented and serve as a microcosm of the lives of women, especially women priests, in the Old Babylonian period. The temple of Shamash was the most prominent building in Sippar. Women were just as active as men in the temple and cloister. Only women could become naditu priests. There were generally about two hundred celibate naditu priests of Shamash living in the cloister at a given time. Most were from royal or upper-class families. Iltani, the naditu sister of King Hammurabi, made offerings of date cakes at festivals. She also leased her orchard for payment of back taxes and leased her field to a scribe. (140)
