= İnandıktepe =

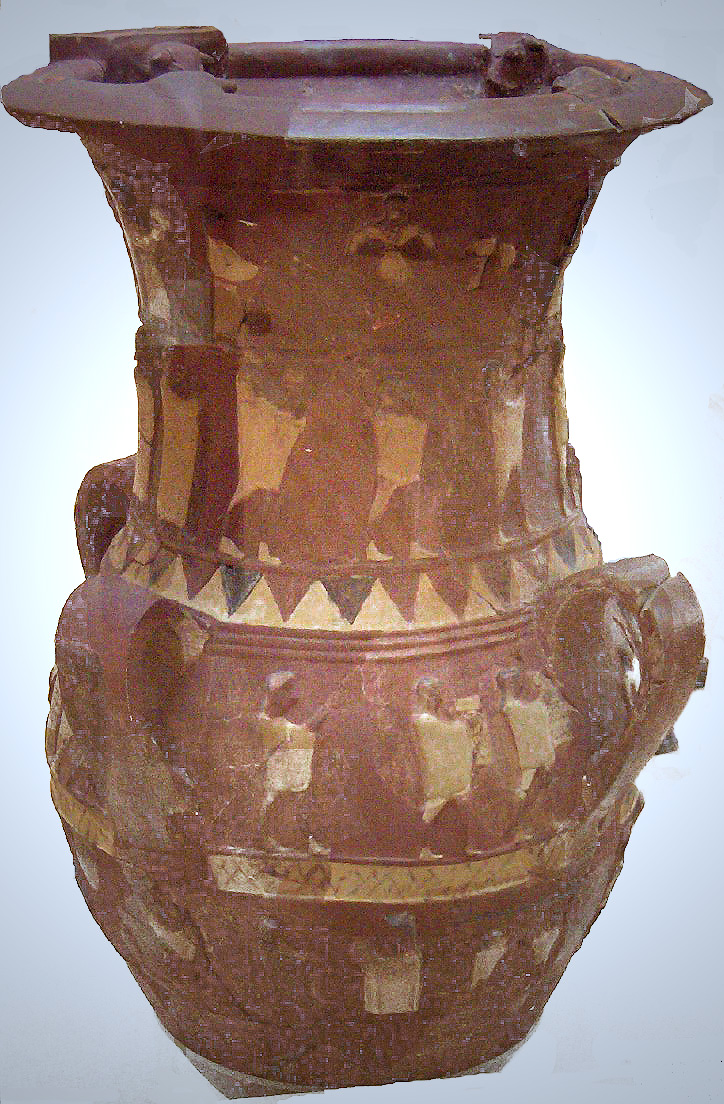
- four-handled large jar with relief decoration from İnandıktepe

- Location within Turkey
- 40°22′52″N 33°32′7″E
- Type: Settlement
- Periods: Bronze Age
- Cultures: Hittite
- Location: Çankiri Province, Turkey
- Region: Anatolia

History
- Built: 2nd millennium BC

İnandıktepe is an archaeological site located in Cankiri Province, Turkey, about 50 miles northeast of Ankara and 115 kilometers northwest of Hattusa.

== History ==
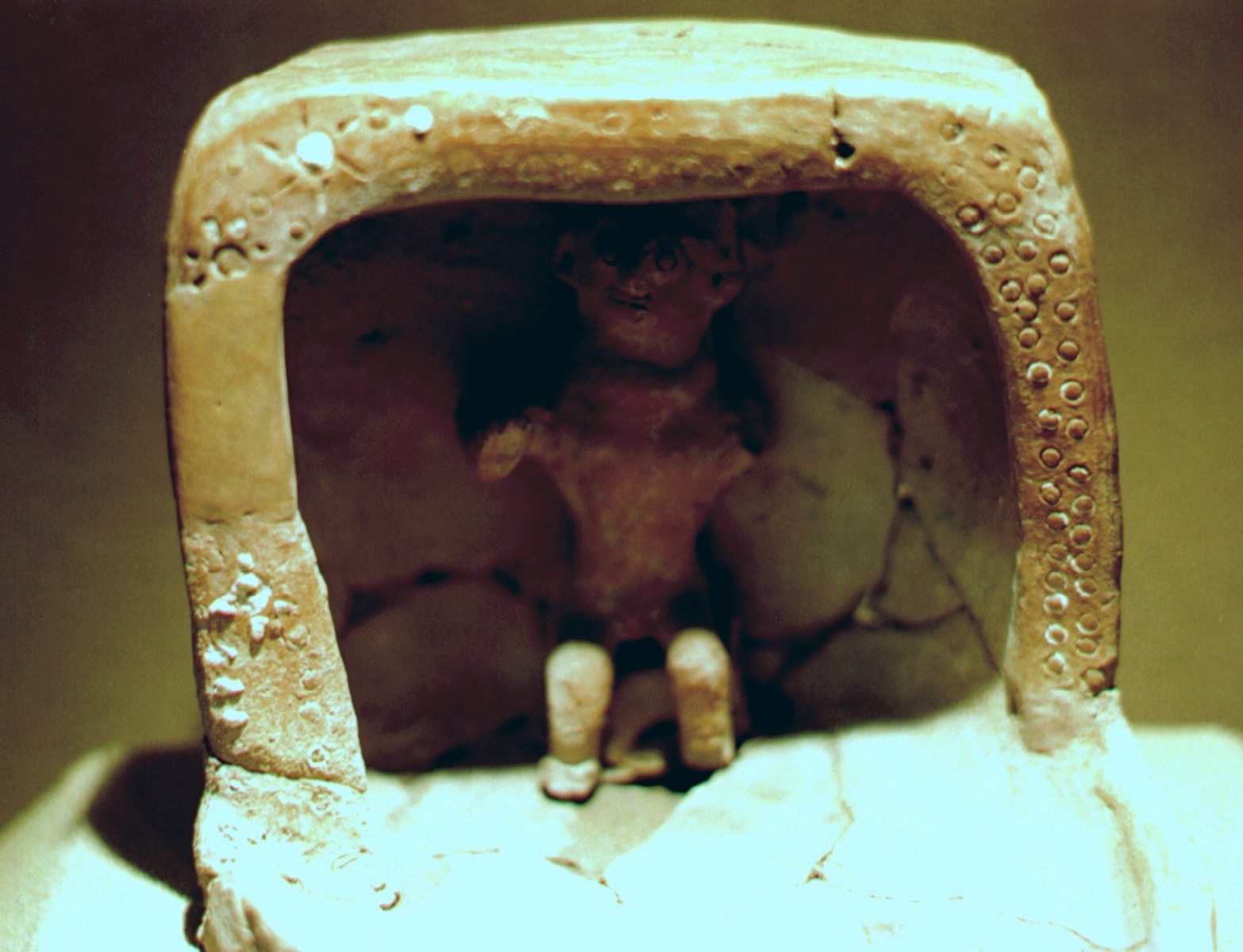
Seated Goddess in the vessel as under heaven, small terracotta, 16 cm, Hittite. Inandik, 1700-1500 BC. Museum of Anatolian Civilizations, Ankara.

Overall five levels could be identified. Levels V, IV and III date to the 2nd millennium BC.

=== Middle Bronze ===
At the end of the Middle Bronze, the Hittite Old Kingdom became the regional power. The Assyrian Trade Network ceasted to operate following the death of Shamshi-Adad and his sons.

=== Late Bronze ===
Most of them dating to the Hittite Age. A complex of about 2000 sq. m. was unearthed extending over the entire ridge of the mound. It was preserved only in parts since it was destroyed in a great fire. The excavators supposed this building to be a temple. Nevertheless, this is controversial - it has also been suggested to be an estate.

Most of the archaeological finds were ceramics. Among them there were small vessels, jugs, a figurine of a bull, a temple-model as well as a tub. In addition there was found a clay tablet with an Akkadian inscription. It documents a land-gift of the official Tutulla. It is sealed by the Tabarna seal.

The 'Tabarna seal' was a type of an archaic royal seal of the Hittites. Such seals do not mention the name of a specific ruler. They were in use till the reigns of the Great Kings Telipinu and Alluwamna, his successor. Hence it can be assumed that this tablet and the layer it was found in date to the late 16th century BC.

== Excavations ==
In 1965 workers found there potsherds of the famous İnandık-vase. Thereafter excavations took place. The site was excavated in 1966 and 1967 by Tahsin Özgüz.

== See also ==
- Cities of the Ancient Near East
- Hittites

== Bibliography ==
- Özgüz (1988). İnandıktepe. Eski Hitit Caginda Önemli Bir Kult Merkezi. Ankara.
- Balkan (1973). İnandık'ta 1966 yılında bulunan eski hitit cagina ait bagis belgesi. Ankara.
- Özgüz T., "İnandiktepe. An Important Cult Center in the Old Hittite Period.", Ankara, 1988
- Mielke (2006). İnandıktepe un Sarissa. In: Mielke, Schoop, Seher (ed): Strukturierung und Datierung in der hethitischen Archäologie. Istanbul, pp. 251–276.
