= Tell al-Rimah =

Archaeological site in Iraq

- Qattara/Karana (?)
- Location within Iraq
- 36°15′25.51″N 42°26′57.61″E
- Type: settlement
- Location: Nineveh Governorate, Iraq
- Region: Mesopotamia

Site notes
- Excavation dates: 1964–1971
- Archaeologists: D. Oates, Theresa Howard Carter

Tell al-Rimah (also Tell ar-Rimah or Tell el-Rimah) is an archaeological settlement mound, in Nineveh Governorate, Iraq, roughly 80 kilometres (50 mi) west of Mosul and ancient Nineveh in the Sinjar region. It lies 15 kilometers south of the site of Tal Afar.

It has been proposed that its ancient name in the 2nd millennium BC was Karana or Qattara or Razama. Karana and Qattara were very close together and thought to be part of a small kingdom. It has also been suggested that the site's name in the 1st Millennium BC was Zamaḫâ. It is near the circular walled similar archaeological sites of Tell Hadheil, a large Early Dynastic site with Old Babylonian and Neo-Assyrian occupation, and Tell Huweish. Tell Hamira, known earlier as Tell Abu Hamira, is 16 kilometers to the east and has also been suggested as the site of Karana.

Currently, archaeology leans toward Qattara as the ancient name of Tell Al-Rimah but this is not at all certain. Given that Qattara and Karana were clearly closely linked and proximate makes this difficult. The town of Ṣarbat is known to have been close to Karana and Qattara.

== Archaeology ==
The site covers an area roughly 25 hectares, surrounded by a polygonal city wall. The interior holds a number of low mounds and a large central mound 30 meters high and 100 meters in diameter.

The region was originally surveyed by Seton Lloyd in 1938, who also investigated the nearby site of Tell Taya. The site of Tell al-Rimah was excavated from 1964 to 1971 by a British School of Archaeology in Iraq team led by David Oates, joined by the Penn Museum and Theresa Howard Carter in the first three years. A large temple and palace (central-eastern part of the tell, 150 meters northeast of the temple) from the early second millennium BC were excavated, as well as a Neo-Assyrian building. Tell al-Rimah also is known for having a third millennium example of brick vaulting. It has been suggested that the city-goddess of Karana was Geshtinanna in Old Babylonian times.

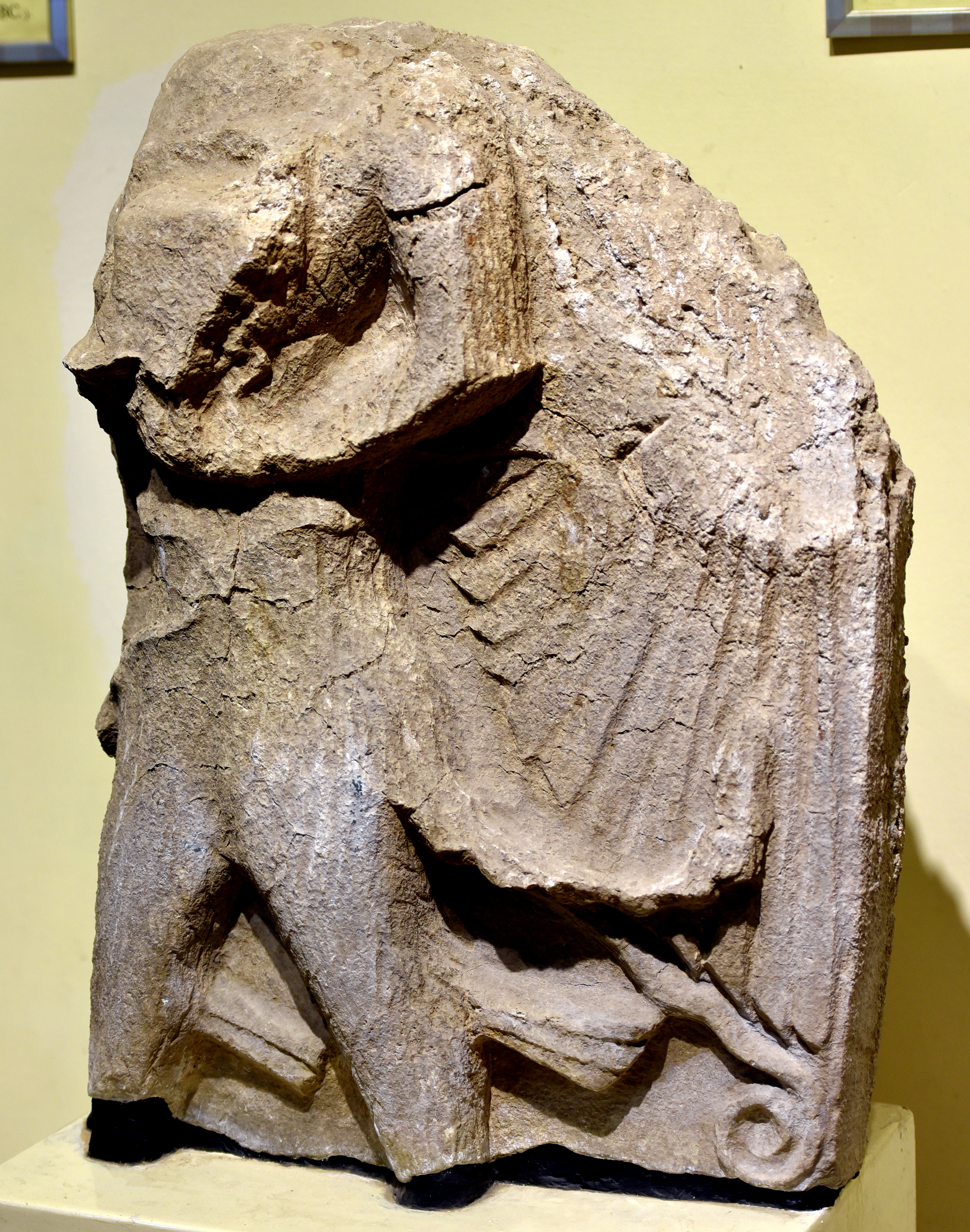
Limestone relief of a male figure from Tell al-Rimah, Iraq. Kassite. Iraq Museum

Although only a small portion, 12 rooms encompassing 385 square meters, of the 1,319 square meter palace was excavated due to its depth, a number of Old Babylonian tablets contemporary with Zimri-Lim of Mari and 40 tablets from the time of Shalmaneser I were found as well as other objects. Most of the Older texts were from the time of the Karana ruler, Aqba-Ḫammu with a few dating to the time of an earlier ruler Ḫadnû-rāpi. The tablets are mostly administrative documents involving loans of grain or tin. The tablets also showed a thriving wine industry. A god, Saggar, known from Mari is also attested in the texts.

Among the finds were over 40 Middle Assyrian period faience rosettes with "transverse perforations on the reverse sides and a knob disc attached to their obverse sides". In Room 1 of the palace a number of large storage jars, in fragments, were found, dated to the reign of Ḫadnû-rāpi by associated tablets. One held an inscription indicating its volume, added after firing, "1 homer 5 sutū 1/3 qû, measured in the sutū of Šamaš.". The jar was determined to hold between 119 and 123 liters.

== History ==
=== Middle Bronze ===
It reached its greatest size and prominence during the second millennium BC. The second millennium activity was primarily strong during the Old Babylonian (contemporary with Zimri-Lim of Mari, Hammurabi of Babylon and Ishme-Dagan of Ekallatum who was the son of Shamshi-Adad I, Amorite ruler of the Kingdom of Upper Mesopotamia) and Mitanni periods. In a letter found at Mari:

Speak to Yasmah-Addu, thus says Ishme-Dagan your brother. I wrote to you before to say that I had gone to Karana to help Samu-Addu. The ruler of Eshnunna, together with all his troops, his courtiers and his friends, has assembled and is staying in Upe and he kept writing to the ruler of Babylon (Hammurabi) to meet him in Mankisum, but the ruler of Babylon did not agree.

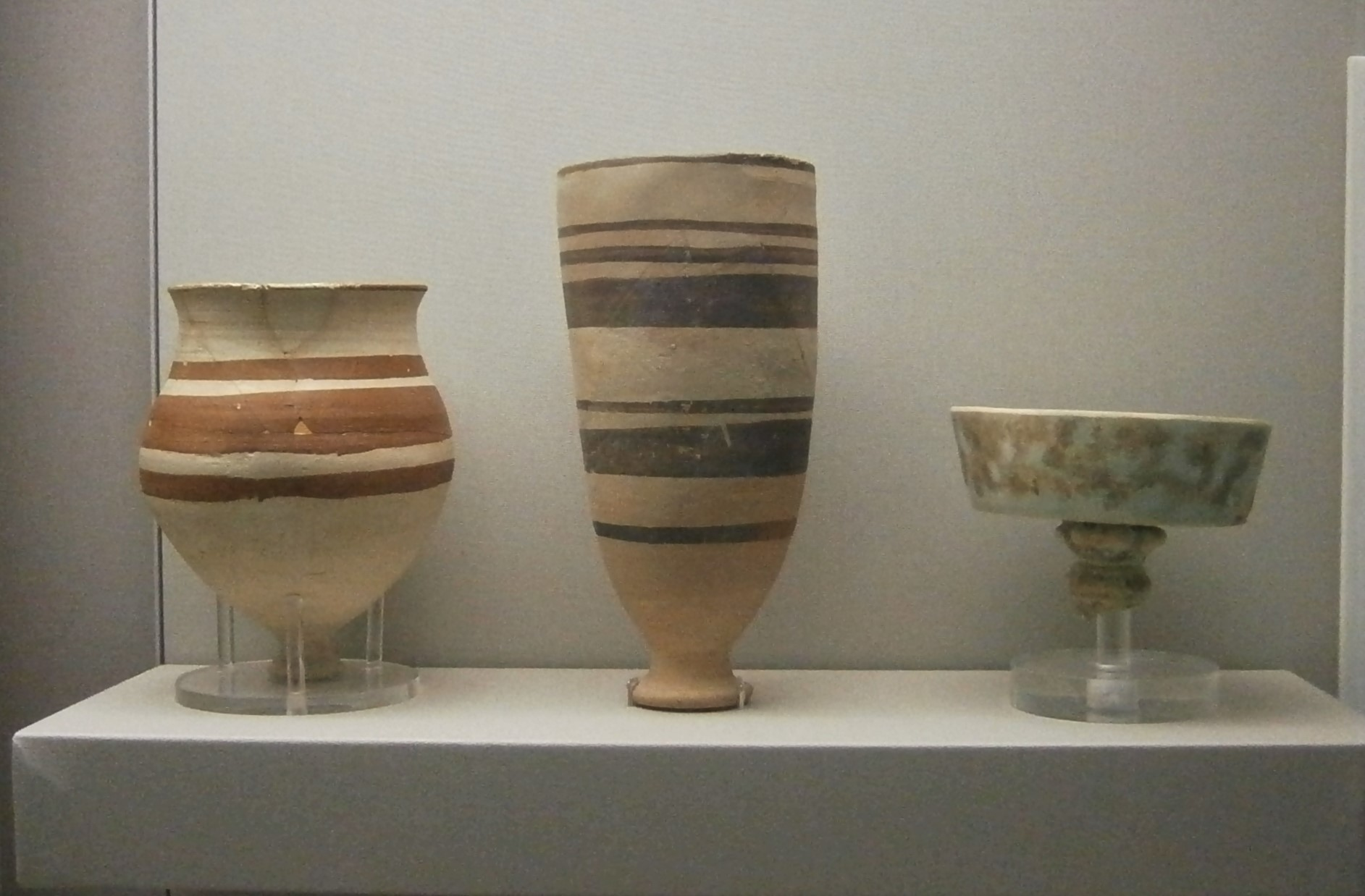
Luxury tableware - Upper Mesopotamia LBA

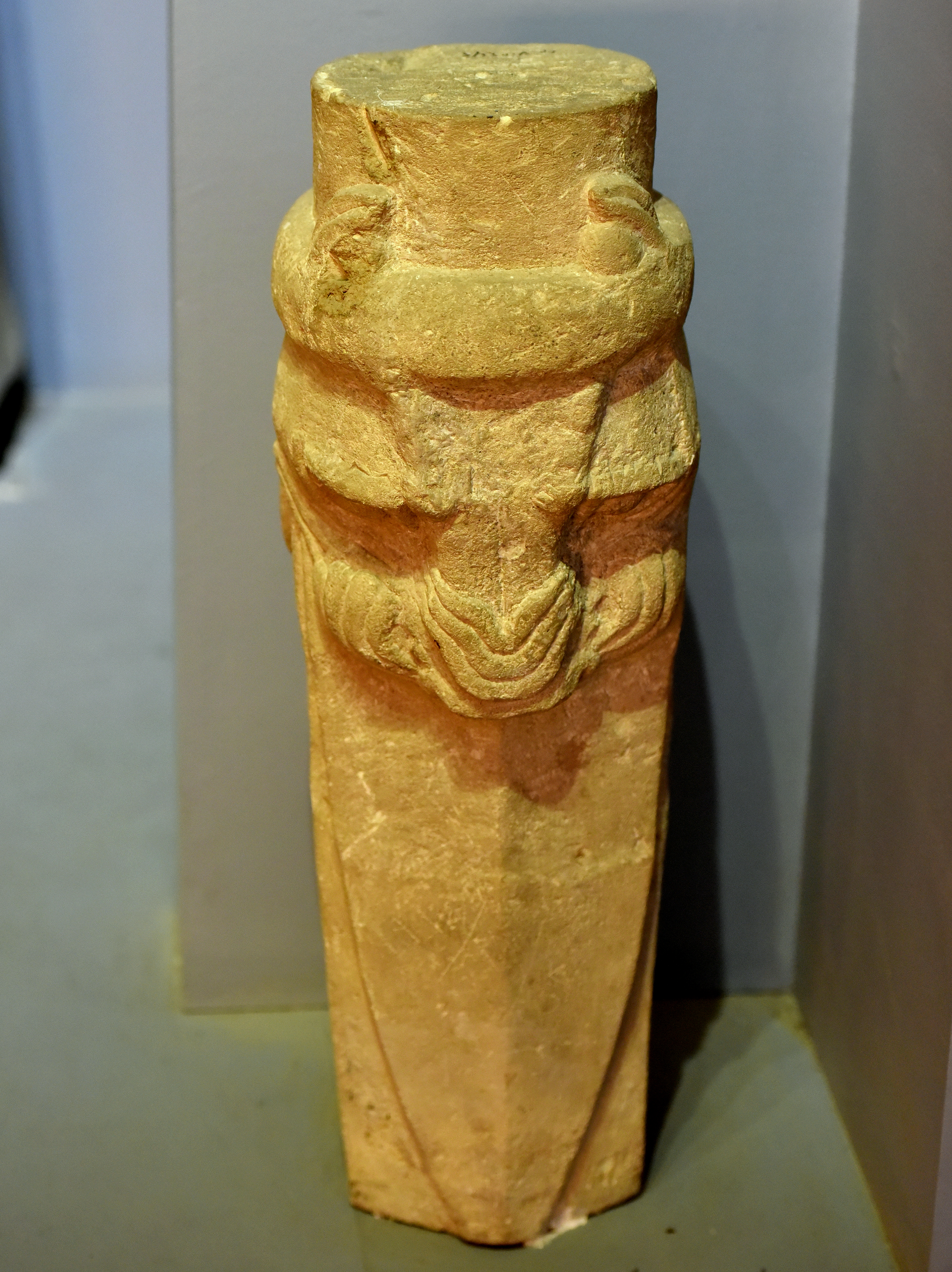
Marble column from Tell al-Rimah, Iraq, Neo-Assyrian period. Iraq Museum

In the Middle Bronze period the site experienced widespread destruction and was abandoned before being re-occupied in the Late Bronze period. In the Mitanni period that followed the Old Babylonian occupation Karana is frequently mentioned in tablets found at the trading city of Nuzi and two Nuzi type tablets were found at Karana. The city was no longer fortified at that time but appears to have been quite prosperous. Another period of abandonment then occurred, followed by re-occupation on a much smaller scale in Neo-Assyrian times.

A notable find was a large archive of letters of Iltani, daughter of Samu-Addu, king of Karana from the Old Babylonian period. The archive covers about a four-year period and amounts to about 200 tablets. It is known she had at least two sons, one named Yasitna-abum and a sister in Assur. Another sister, Amat-Shamash, who was a priestess in Sippar who once sent her a gift of shrimp.

The slaves whom my father gave me have grown old; now, I have sent half a mina of silver to the king; allow me my claim and get him to send me slaves who have been captured recently, and who are trustworthy. In recollection of you, I have sent to you five minas of first-rate wool and one container of shrimps

Her husband was Aqba-aḫum of Qaṭṭara who in a text found at Mari wrote to her saying "The ice (house) of Qaṭṭara should be unsealed, so that the goddess, you, and Belassunu could drink from it as needed. But the ice must remain under guard.". Another Mari text involving Iltani reveals that there was a version of the goddess Istar at Qatara.

1 goat, offering of Iltani to Išḫara of Aritanaya; 1 goat offering of Iltani to Ištar of Ninet (Nineveh); 1 spring lamb, offering of Iltani to Ištar of Qaṭṭara, when she dedicated (a votive) statue of Yadruk-Addu; 1 lamb, offering of Iltani to Sin [8.x*.Ṣabrum].

An Old Babylonian period seal was found saying "i-lí-sa-ma-[ás] dumu iq-qa-at utu/iskur ir pí-it-ha-na," i.e., "Ill-Samas, son of Iqqāt-Šamas Addu, servant of Pithana" which has given rise to the suggestion that this referred to Pithana who was ruler of the Anatolian city of Kuššara, although that reading of the ruler's name is not certain.

=== Late Bronze Age ===
Occupation is known primarily from the Abu-tab archive of about 100 tablets and fragments found in the courtyard on the south side of the temple. Some were dateable by limmu to the reign of Middle Assyrian ruler Shalmaneser I (c. 1273–1244 BC) with a few to early years of following ruler Tukulti-Ninurta I c. 1243–1207 BC. Most are economic in nature.

=== Iron Age ===
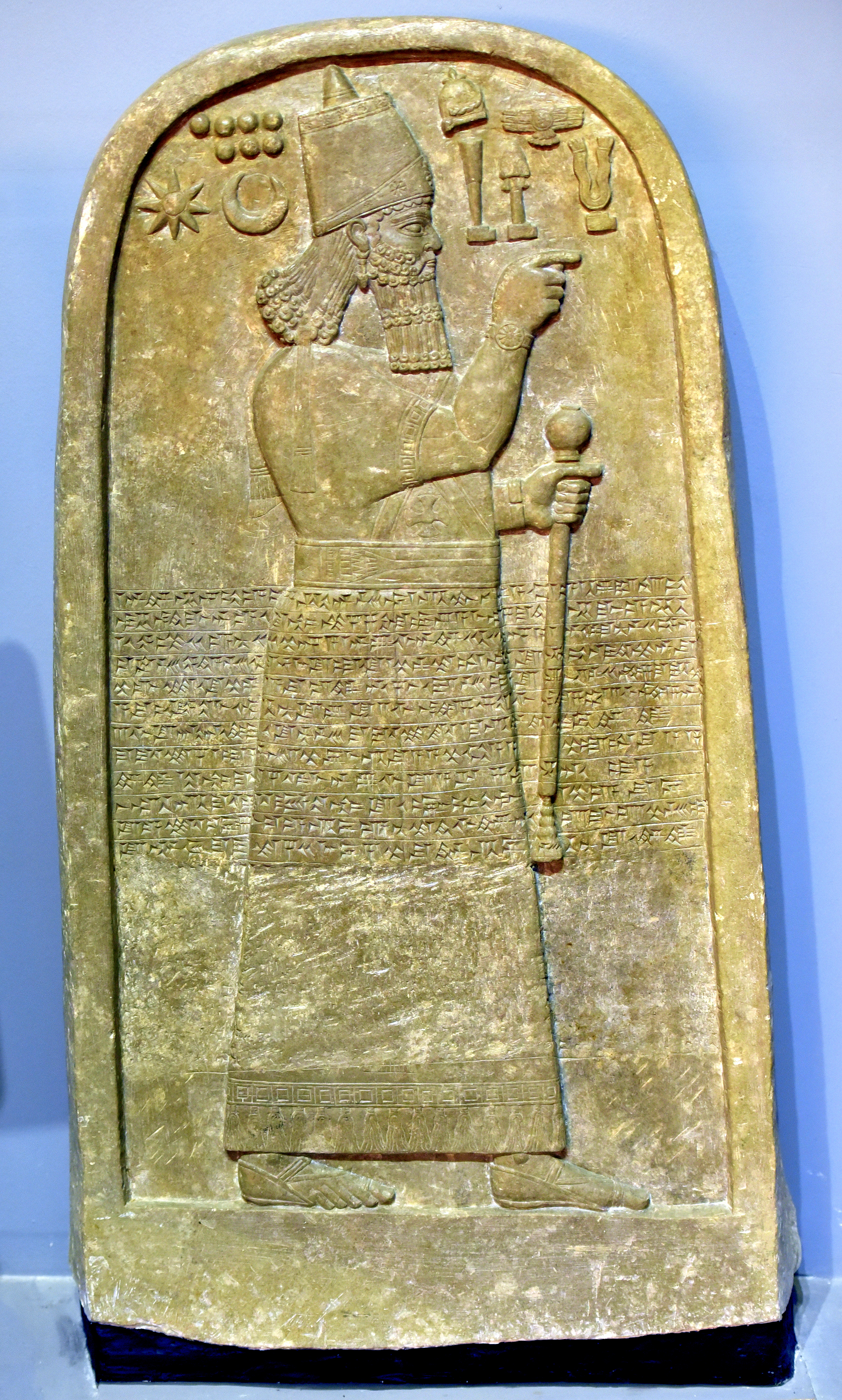
Stele of Adad-nirari III from Tell al Rimah, discovered in 1967, now in the Iraq Museum in Baghdad

The site was lightly occupation in the later Iron Age period. The most notable artifact found was the stele of Neo-Assyrian ruler Adad-nirari III (811 to 783 BC), known as the Tell al-Rimah stela, which may mention an early king of Northern Israel stating "He received the tribute of Ia'asu the Samaritan, of the Tyrian (ruler) and of the Sidonian (ruler)" and contains the first cuneiform mention of Samaria by that name. On the side of the stele was an inscription of Nergal-ereš, who names himself "governor of Raṣappa". It has been suggested, based on the stele, that Tell al-Rimah has called Zamaḫâ at that time. A larger version of this stele was found at Dūr-Katlimmu.

== Karana ==
=== Known rulers of Karana ===
- Samu-Addu - father of Iltani and Ashkur-Addu. fled to Eshnunna
- Hatnu-rapi
- Ashkur-Addu - son of Samu-Addu, brother of Iltani, father of Bini-shakim
- Aqba-hammu - husband of Iltani, vassal of Hammurabi

Samu-Addu held power in the last years of Shamshi-Adad of Ekallatum and may have been a vassal. With the death of Shamshi-Adad Mari, under Zimri-Lim expanded in the region and Hatnu-rapi, an ally of Zimri-Lim, took power. Hatnu-rapi was present at the sack of Shubat-Enil, the royal city of Shamshi-Adad. In a letter found at Karana:

Speak to Hatnu-rapi, thus says Bunu-Ishtar your brother. When you have read this letter, you, Sharriya and the other kings who are on your side get together and muster 4,000 men between you. And I from here shall muster 2,000 men. The former plus the latter, 6,000 good men, let us muster between us, and let us send them quickly to the help of Zimri-Lim; indeed, let us act to save Zimri-Lim. This is not a matter for neglect; let us apply ourselves to this, that we may the sooner send these troops to Zimri-Lim. May my brother not neglect this message of mine!

Ashkur-Addu then deposed Hatnu-rapi, who fled to Mari. A clay sealing read "Bini-sakin, foremost son of the king, servant of Askur-Addu". A messenger text found at Karana "They have brought in four tablets of the governor of Susa in Elam.... I opened those tablets... but there was no news in them" showed the wide regional interconnections at this time. Aqba-hammu then deposed Ashkur-Addu and became a vassal of Hammurabi.

== Razama ==
Razama (ra-za-ma-a^{ki}) was an ancient Near East city which achieved prominence in the Old Babylonian period and was capital of the land of Yussan/Yassan. It is currently unlocated. A complication is that there were two cities of this name in that period. It is known that at one point the chief archivist at Razama, appointed by Shamshi-Adad I of the Kingdom of Upper Mesopotamia, was a Sîn-iddinam. There is an unpublished treaty between Mutlya of Apum and Hazip-Tessup of Razamä. The city was briefly controlled by Ishme-Dagan I, ruler of Isin, after attacking it with the assistance of Eshnunna, before it was recaptured by Zimri-Lim.

A text found at Tell Leilan (Subat-Enlil) mentions a Hurrian prince of the Razama, Hazip-Tessup. A tablet found at Me-Turan carried a year name of Silli-Sin, a ruler of Eshnunna who was a contemporary of Hammurabi, "Year Razama was smitten by weapons".

Razama is mentioned in several texts found at the site of Mari. In the 10th regnal year of Mari ruler Zimri-Lim (c. 18th century BC) an army led by Atamrum, king of Allahad and later of Andarig to attack Razama which was ruled by Šarriya/Šarraya (Šarrum-kīma-kalima), a vassal of Zimri-Lim. The army consisted of troops from Eshnunna and Elam. There was a long, and unsuccessful siege of the city. The defenders practiced a strategy of active defense "When troops arrived at Razama, when they arrived, the troops of the city came out and killed 700 Elamites and 600 Eshnunakeans". They also dropped bitumen on the attacker's siege towers and burned them. After a siege ramp was constructed it was attacked:

... Citizens made a tunnel in the city. They made two holes in the wall, right and left toward the front of the ramp. At night they entered [that] tunnel, and in the early morning, the troops of the city [came] out and killed half of the troops (of Atamrum). They made them drop the bronze lances and their shields and brought them inside the city

=== Location of Razama ===
In a text found at Mari, Razama it states "500 Turukkeans made a raid below Ekallatum and Aššur and reached Razama" which would place the city south of those cities. Ekallatum is unlocated but is known to be in the vicinity of Assur. In another Mari text a journey of ruler Zimri-Lim has him taking the path "... Rassum, Tadum, Ilan-sura, Razama-of-Yussan, and Husla". In a messenger text from Mari a route is recorded of "[The route of the messen]gers [of the Ya]minites [between Ešnunna] and Karana, [he made it known to me] [thus: (from Ešnunna) to Dur]-Sin; [from Dur]-Sin to Arrapḫa; [from Ar]rapha [to Ka]wa[lhum]; [from K]awalh[um] to Razama of the Yamutbal; from Razama of the Yamutbal to Karana; from Karana to Allahad. To the river bank: this is their route". A reconstruction of Old Babylonian period trading routes included one "ASSUR – Sadduatum – Razama sa Bura – Abidiban – Qattara – Razama sa Uhakim – Kaluzanum – Adubazum – Daraqum – Apum ...".

Tell al-Hawa has been suggested as the location. Tell al-Rimah has been proposed based on a tablet found in the palace area, Site C:

Šarrum-kīma-kalima, son of Aniškibal, builder of the palace in Razamā, his capital city.

== See also ==
- Cities of the ancient Near East
- Short chronology timeline
- Early and simple domes
