= Temple in antis =

Historical architectural design

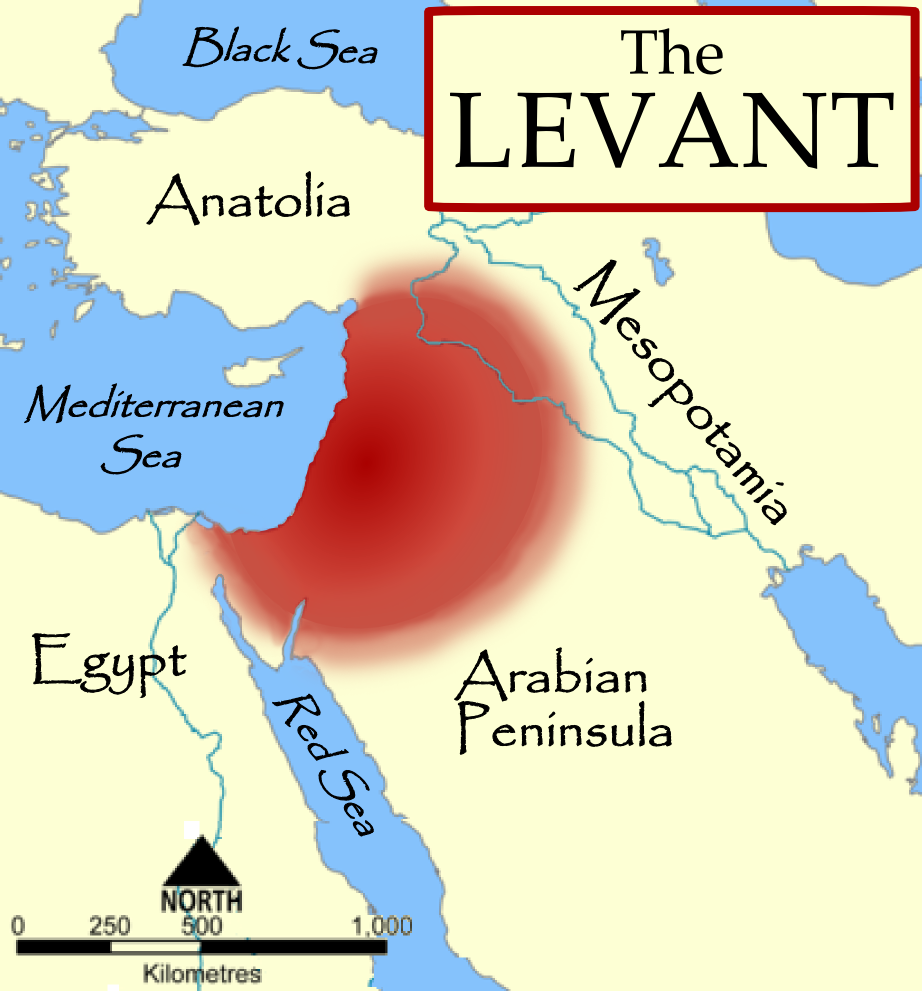
the levant

The temple in antis is an architectural design for temples in Syria and other parts of the Levant starting in the Early Bronze Age (3500–3000 BCE) and persisting until the Iron Age (1000–586 BCE). The design has a porch formed by extensions, or antae, of the side walls at each side.

Arriving from Northern Syria whether from Assyrian or Amorite diffusion, the temples share similar characteristics with some home designs from Anatolia in modern Turkey. Most of the temples follow similar design plans making it easy to track their spread across the Levant. These temples give a glimpse into the religious practices and urbanization that took place in the Levant during the Bronze and Iron Age.

Some examples of some temples in Antis include Solomon's Temple, the sanctuary of Tell Al-Rawda, and Ain Dara.

== Design ==
With a widespread cultural community sharing and integrating building designs throughout the near east, many of the designs, especially the Ante portion of the temple in Antis, are seen. G. R. H. Wright even noted that looking at plans alone one can misinterpret a storage room for a temple. The plans are simple, uniform, and segmented into three parts Having an entrance, vestibule, cult room (a long rectangular room with a religious icon as the focus), and the Holy of Holies, a hidden part of the temple placed in the back of the temple from the general public. Only a few were allowed in. The temples were set apart from the rest of the city with an enclosure surrounding them and most seem to have been designed to fit the city plan. Moreover, it seems that the temples were constructed on the sites of previous temples. Constructed from mud bricks, laid on a foundation of rubble stones and stone blocks. Evidence from Tell Rawada also suggests a porch with columns between the ante and a facade on the outer wall. The shape of the temple is based on the diameters of the cult room, with regional variations in size and shape. Most of the Temples in Syrian and the Levant had their entrances face towards the sunrise, and had an open area or courtyard in front. The opening of the temple and the cult focus/deity effigy would be aligned together, with the entrance being on one of the short sides and having a wide square cult room.

The cult room would be the main room of worship, wooden dividers would help break the room up into sections. There is evidence that there many have been a second story due to the thickness of the walls and presence of stairs at some sites.

== Religious practices ==
The temples in the Levant were not just public places of worship, they were the abodes of the gods. Mud brick pedestals would be set in the cult room or Holy of Holies with the images of that temple's patron deity. Offerings were left on platforms in the cult room, and evidence shows that rituals were performed in the vestibule. With varying designs and artifacts found it is hard to make a full picture of religious practices without written documentation, which unlike the rest of the region is not as prevalent in the Levant.

== Temples ==
=== Solomon's temple ===
Solomon's temple, as recorded in the Hebrew Bible, was the first temple in Jerusalem. Solomon, King of Judea and Israel, built the temple and dedicated it to Yahweh. During the time before it was sacked by King Nebuchadnezzar II in 587 BCE, the temple was home to many religious ceremonies and patron deities as time progressed. Since the remains of the ancient temple now reside beneath the Dome of the Rock any archaeological dig is currently unlikely.

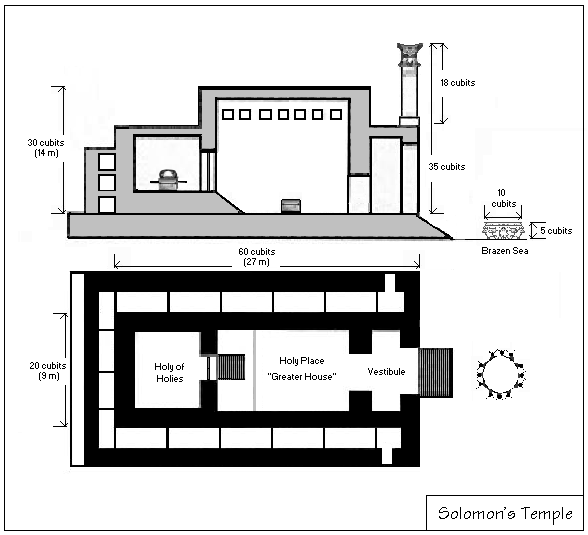
Solomon's temple

==== Design ====
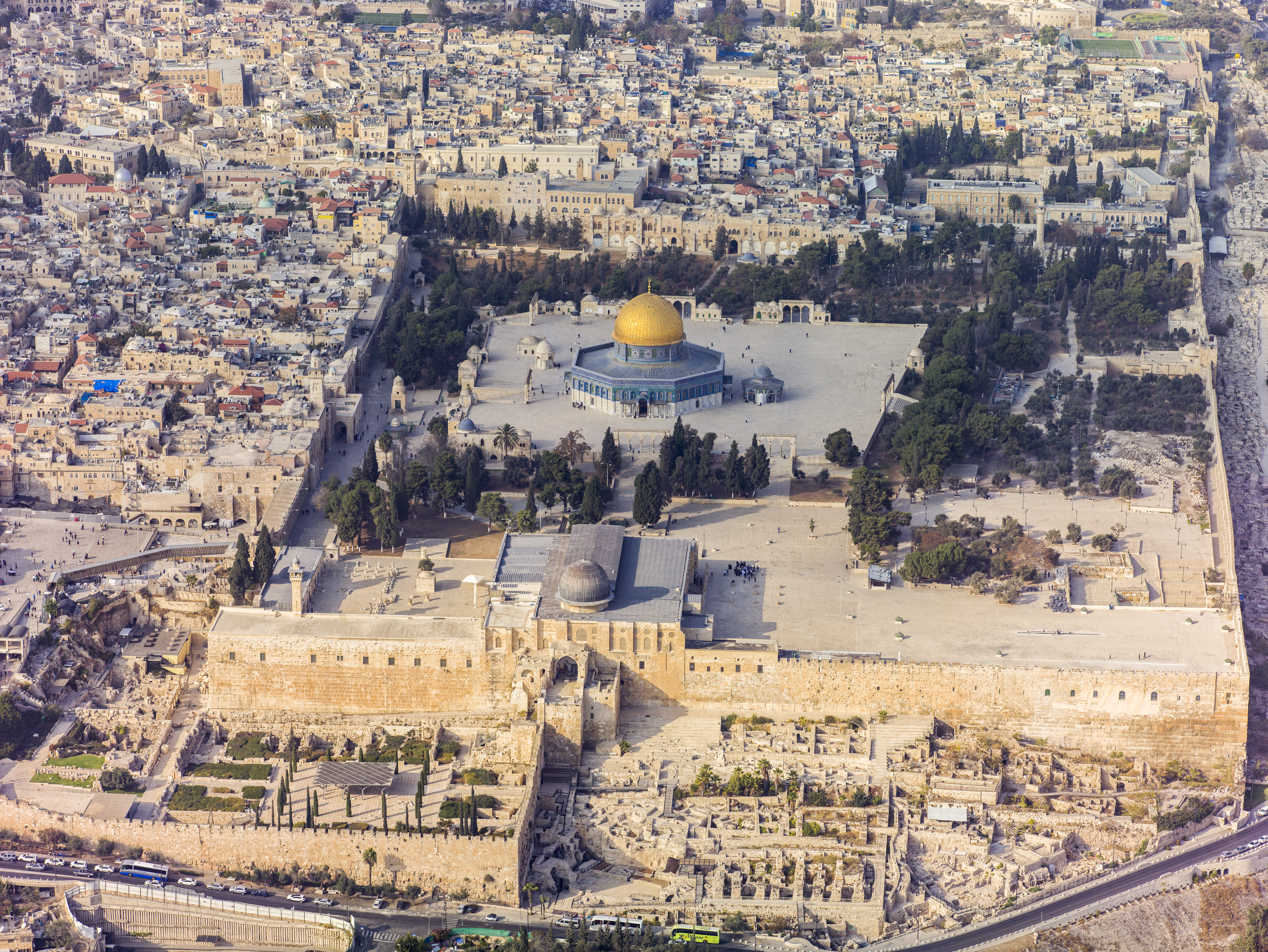
Dome of the Rock

===== Porch (ulam) =====
As in most temples in antis the Porch faces towards the rising sun and acts as an entrance to the temple. The width of Porch and temple were the same, both being 20 cubits, and the depth of the porch was 10 cubits.

===== Main hall (Hekal/ cella) =====
The main hall or Hekal was 40 cubits long According to the bible this room walls were covered in carved cedar murals with gold inlay. The main hall was the home to many important relics to the Israelites such as the Menorah.

===== Holy of Holies (Debir) =====
The holiest part of the temple which was said to house the Ark of the Covenant. 20 cubits long and half the height of the main hall suggesting that it was reached by going upstairs. Gold and cedar adorned the room and it was regarded as the home of Yahweh, or the patron deity at the time.

=== Temple at Ain Dara ===
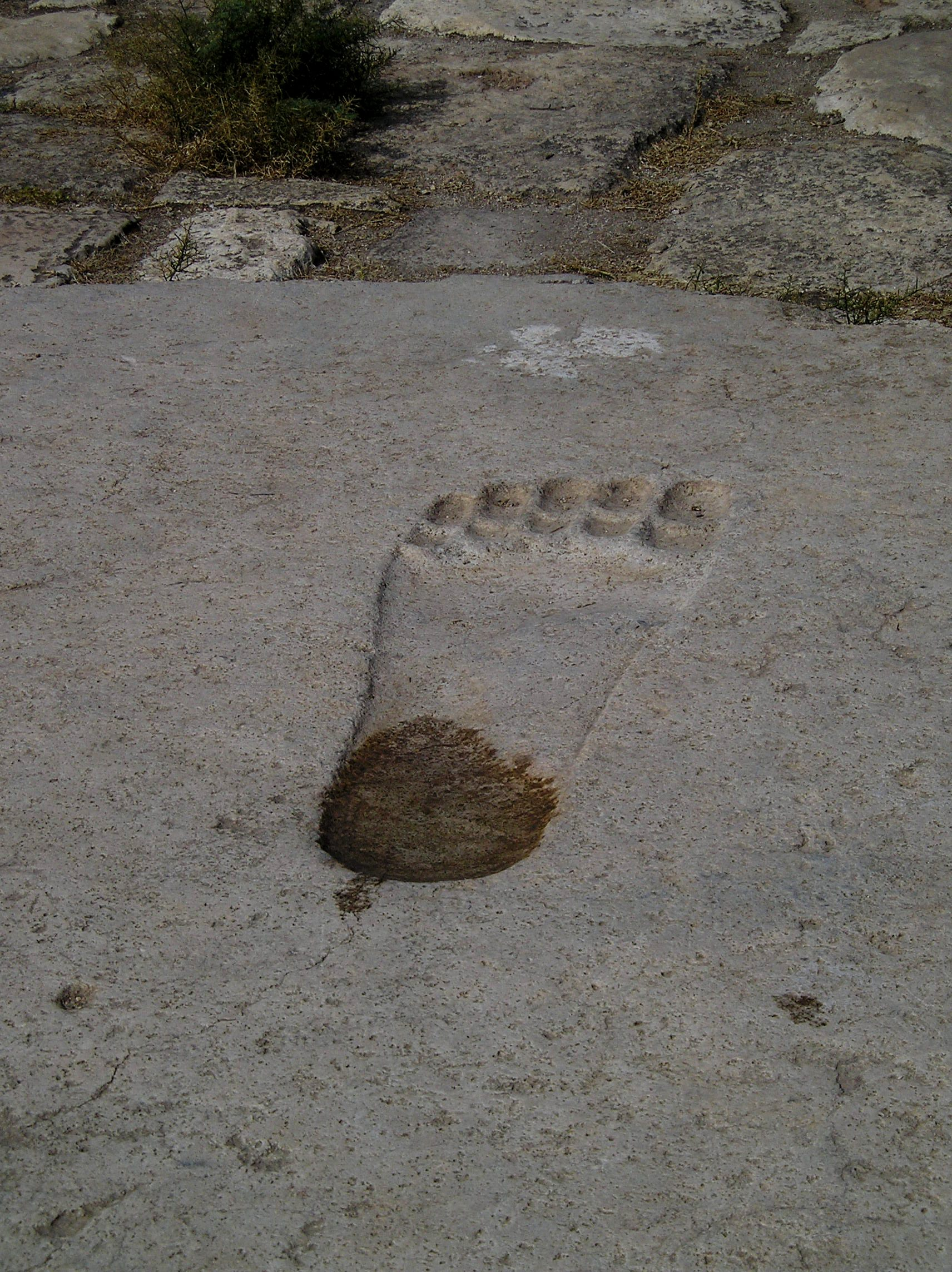
left foot at Ain Dara

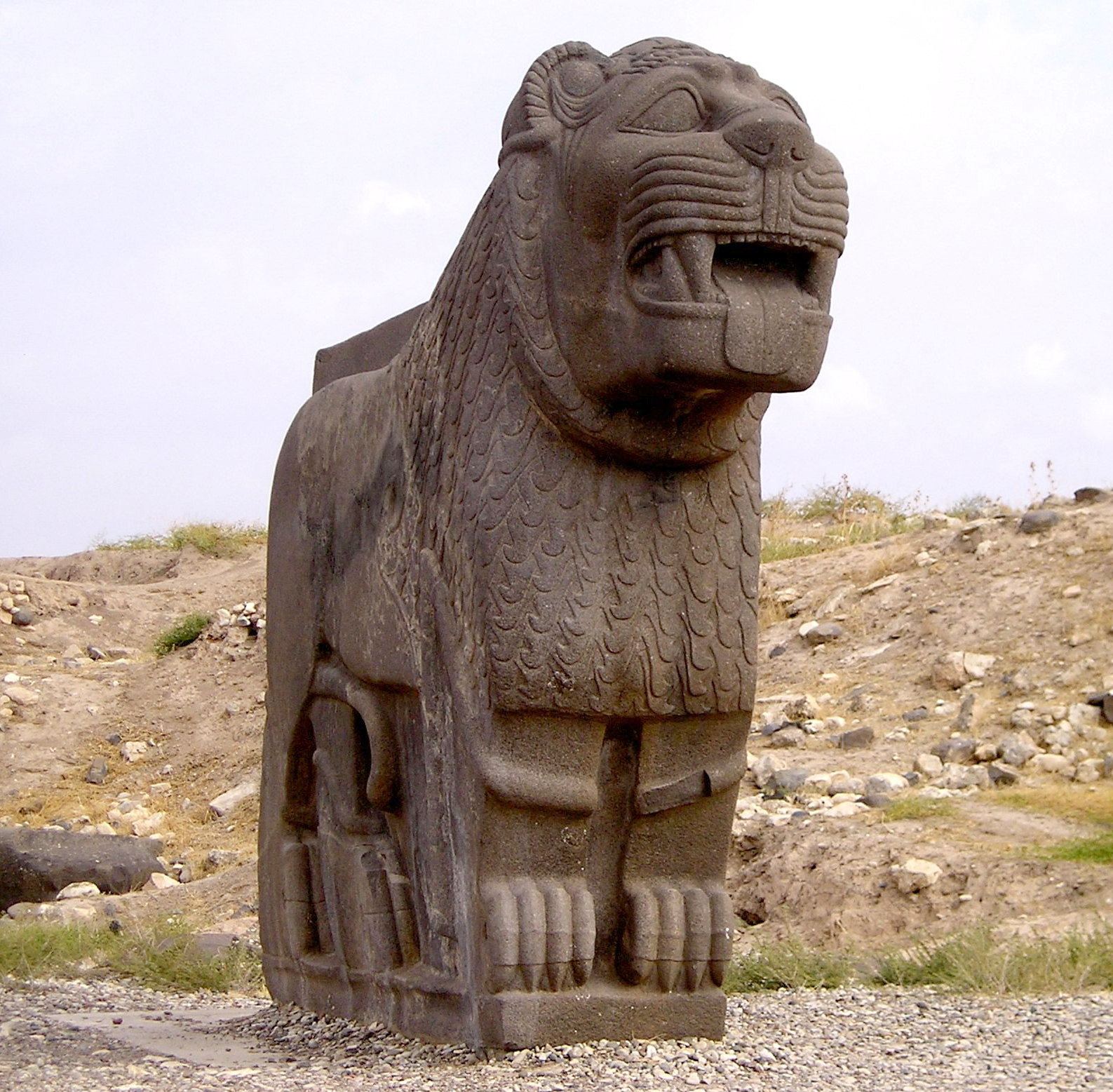
Basalt Lion at Ain Dara

Located in Northern Syria, and built during the late Bronze Age (1300 BC until 740 BC), predating Solomon's temple. It was built in a three part style with a foundation of limestone and basalt, but the temple itself would have been mudbrick and wood. Sandstone marks the borders of where the courtyard would have been, leading up to the porch. The open-air porch is marked by two pillars, and is not as embedded into the temple's face as others of its design. The vestibule to the main room is almost square, and the ante on the outer wall is slightly wider than the rest of the wall creating the porch. Carved into the floor between the porch and main hall are several feet, the meaning is debatable, but probably marks the deities path into the temple. The main hall has an altar on the back wall, where the temple deity would have been placed. The walls of the main room are engraved with lions and other artwork. At the back of the temple there is a hall full of carved stelae with pictures of religious practices and royalty of the time.

=== Al-Rawda ===
Located on the Syrian steppe, Al-Rawda is an archeological site or tell with an abundance of dwellings and temples. The layout of the site seems to suggest that the town was planned before construction. At the northeast of the site there is a large religious fortification. There seems to be multiple temples at the site, One large temple in antis connected to a smaller one and evidence of more that have yet to be excavated. Reaching 60m in front of the temple there is an enclosure that houses the courtyard and other buildings related to the temples. The largest temple at the site seems to be built on top of two previous temples.

== See also ==
- King Solomon
- Canaanite religions
- Assyrian Empire
- Mesopotamia
