= Tulul al-Baqarat =

Archaeological site in Wasit Governorate, Iraq

- Tulūl al-Baqarāt
- Location within Iraq
- 32°20′14.86″N 45°43′17.48″E
- Type: settlement
- Periods: Bronze Age, Iron Age
- Cultures: Early Dynastic, Ur III period, Akkadian Period, Neo-Babylonian Empire
- Location: Wasit Governorate, Iraq

History
- Built: c. 2600 BC
- Abandoned: 600 AD

Site notes
- Excavation dates: 2008-2010, 2013-2022
- Archaeologists: Carlo Lippoles, Ayad Mahir Mahmud
- Condition: Ruined
- Owner: Public
- Public access: Yes

Tulul al-Baqarat or Tulūl al-Baqarāt, is an ancient Near East archaeological site in Wasit Governorate of Iraq about 180 kilometers southeast of modern Baghdad. It is located seven kilometers to the northeast of Tell al-Wilayah (with which it was connected by an ancient canal) and 20 kilometers south of the city of Kut. The site was occupied from the 4th millennium BC to the Islamic period. It is thought to be the site of the ancient Early Dynastic city of Kesh.

== History ==
Various portions of Tulul al-Baqarat were occupied from the 4th millennium BC all the way up to the 1st millennium AD.

- The main mound, TB1 (Tell Baqarāt 1), was occupied in the Uruk, Jemdet Nasr, Early Dynastic, Akkadian, Ur III period, Neo-Babylonian, Parthian and Islamic periods. Occupation in the 2nd millennium BC was sparse. This mound, the largest mound, measures 330 meters by 260 meters with an area of about 10 hectares and rises to about 12 meters in height. It contained a large religious on a large terrace. The complex contained three areas. The northern sector dates to the ED, Akkadian, and Ur II periods. The southern area consists of an open area with a monumental baked brick stairway leading to an upper terrace containing religious buildings. The construction of the Neo-Babylonian temple destroyed some of the earlier levels. Features exposed in the 2008-2010 excavations have been subject to significant erosion. The western area has been heavily damaged by looters and has not been explored. Mound TB1 has been proposed as the location of Kesh.
- Mound TB2 dates to the Late Islamic period. Stone inscriptions and tablets found by the Italian excavators carried the name of Naram-Sin of Akkad, Ur-Nammu (including a brick stamp on the construction of a temple for the goddess Ninhursag), Šulgi and Šū-Suen of Ur III, and Nabopolassar and Nebuchadnezzar of the Neo-Babylonians.
- Mound TB4 was occupied in the Jemdet Nasr and Early Dynastic periods based on a small sounding. It is low, about 2.5 meters, and its extent is 260 meters by 75 meters, with an area of about 2.3 hectares. It consists of two sub-mounds connected by a flat area. Bricks found were of the plano-convex type. It lies about 200 meters south of TB1.
- Mound TB5 was occupied in the late 3rd millennium BC and early 2nd millennium BC. Bricks were found dated to the 26th year of the Ur III king Shulgi i.e. "(The divine) Šulgi, mighty man, king of Ur, king of the four quarters". TB5 is, rather was, a low area 400 meters by 250 meters.
- Mounds TB7/TB8 were occupied in the Uruk, Jemdet Nasr and Early Dynastic I period. These mounds are rounded with TB7 being 280 meters in diameter (about 7.6 hectares) with a central elevation and TB8 180 meters in diameter (about 3.1 hectares) and flat topped. A large Early Uruk period building (building A), judged to be residential, with associated graves, was found at the top of TB7 which lies one kilometers south of TB1. A number of stone (chert and obsidian) tools were found on TB7, dated to the early 4th millennium BC.
- Mounds TB9/TB10 were occupied in the Sassanian and early Islamic periods.
- Mounds TB3/TB6 were occupied in the Parthian and Islamic periods.

== Archaeology ==
The site is about 3 kilometers across and contains ten tells. The largest mound TB1 was excavated, in response to serious looting, by a team from the Iraqi State Board of Antiquities and Heritage led by Ayad Mahir Mahmud from 2008 to 2010. They found an enclosed multiperiod temple/sanctuary area which had been rebuilt during the Neo-Babylonian period, dedicated to the goddess Ninhursag. Bricks used in the rebuilding had stamps of Nebuchadnezzar II. An apparent destruction layer was found dating to the end of the 3rd millennium BC. Mound TB4 was also briefly excavated with a single sounding on the southern end of the top. To date publication of architecture and stratigraphy have been limited. In 2013 excavations by an Italian team from the University of Turin led by Dr. Carlo Lippoles, under the auspices of Centro Ricerche Archeologiche e Scavi di Torino (CRAST), the Università degli Studi di Torino and the Italian Ministry of Foreign Affairs and International Cooperation, and in conjunction with the Iraqi Department of General Investigation and Excavations, resumed. The first season consisted of a survey and soundings on TB1 and TB4. The second season in 2015 entailed surveying and soundings on TB1 and TB7. In the 3rd season, surveying continued and augmented by laser scanning and excavation was extended on TB1 and TB7. Another excavation season was held in 2021 and ran from 25 September to 17 November focusing on TB4 and TB7. The 2022 excavation season was from 25 April to 22 May focusing on TB7 holding a large Uruk period residential building.

An important find at Tulul al-Baqarat was an Akkadian period diorite fragment with a long portion of the military campaign of Naram-Sin where he destroyed the city of Armanum and proceeded on tho the Cedar Mountains and the Mediterranean Sea. Also found was a fragmentary Early Dynastic stele of a worship scene and some Uruk period Beveled rim bowls.

By the time of the original Iraqi excavations the site was already heavily damaged by looters, especially in the northern and central sections. The looting exacerbated the already serious effects of erosion. Agricultural activity is also a major problem. The TB5 mound was surveyed in 2013 but by the time excavators returned in 2015 it had been completely bulldozed away, including 3 feet below the surface level, for cultivation even though it was a designated archaeological location. Numerous modern irrigation canals have also causes damage throughout Tulul al-Baqarat.

== See also ==
- Cities of the ancient Near East
