= Kani Shaie =

Archaeological site in Iraq

- Location within Iraq
- 35°33′29″N 45°10′35″E
- Type: settlement
- Periods: Halaf, Ubaid, Uruk, Early Dynastic, Islamic
- Location: Sulaymānīyah Governorate, Iraq

History
- Built: 4th millennium BC

Site notes
- Excavation dates: 2013, 2015-2016, 2018, 2024
- Archaeologists: Maria da Conceição Lopes, André Tomé, Steve Renette
- Condition: Ruined
- Owner: Public
- Public access: Yes

Kani Shaie is a small ancient Near East archaeological site located within the Sulaymaniyah Governorate in the Kurdistan Region of northeast Iraq in the Basian Basin at the western edge of the Zagros Mountains. It lies about 23 kilometers west of modern Sulaymaniyah and to the northeast of the ancient site of Girdi Qala and Logardan.

Its main period of occupation was from the 5th millennium BC Chalcolithic period until the middle of the 3rd millennium BC Early Bronze Age, roughly 5000 BC until 2500 BC, encompassing the Ubaid period, Uruk period and Early Dynastic period. Minor occupation was noted in the lower town from the Halaf, Ubaid, Neo-Assyrian, Parthian, and Islamic periods, along with an Ottoman period cemetery.

== Archaeology ==
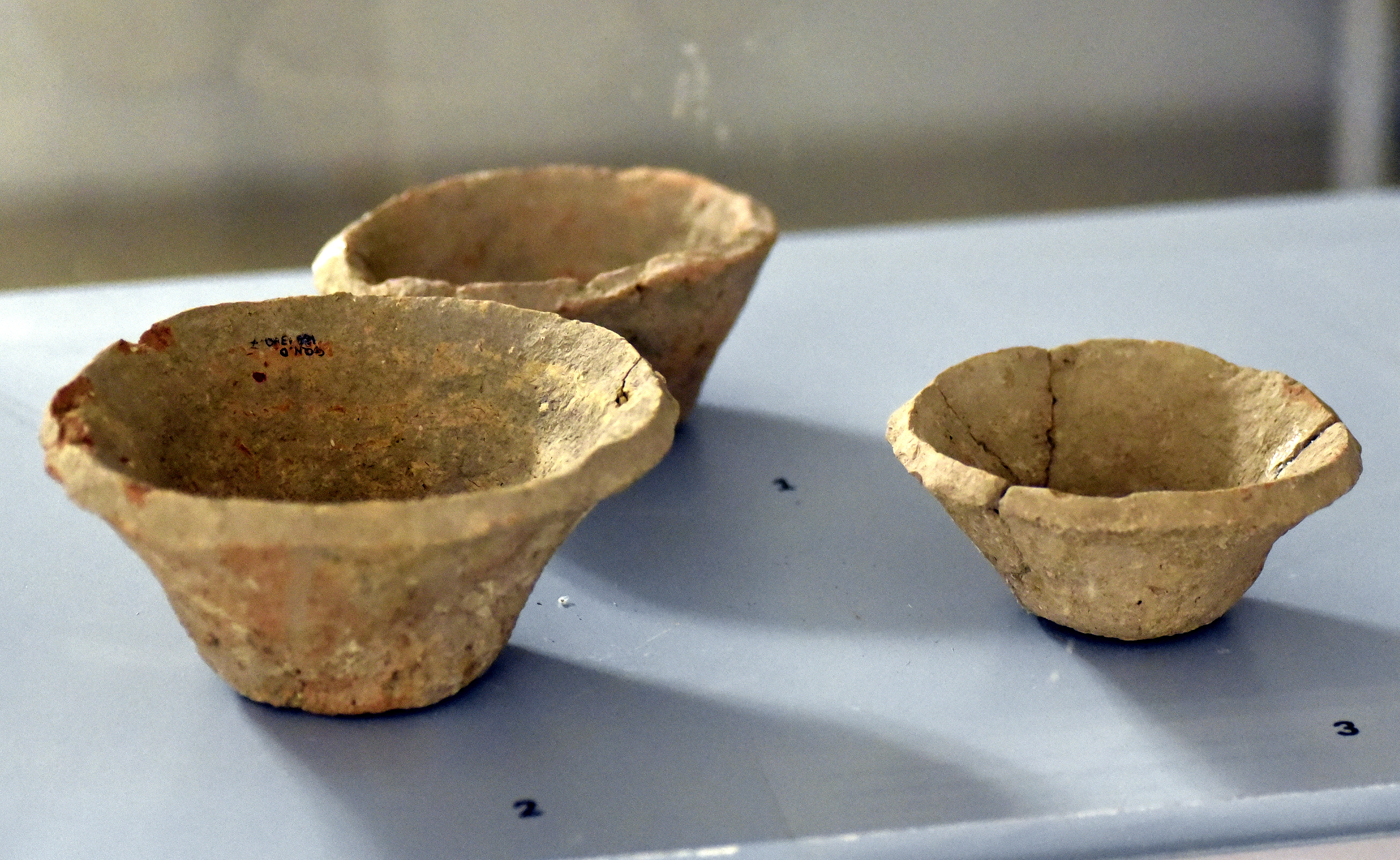
Beveled rim bowls from Logardan, Sulaymaniyah Governorate, northern Iraq. Uruk period, 4000-3100 BC. Sulaymaniyah Museum

The site covers an area of about 3 hectares (with the main mound being about 0.5 hectares and with a diameter of 75 meters at the base) and rises to a height of about 15 meters, including 4 meters of Early Bronze Age deposits. A "lower town" extends northward from the base of the mound. It was first noted by E.A. Speiser in the 1920s during a regional survey and again by Braidwood in 1960. After a brief survey in March 2012, in 2013, 2015, and 2016 the site was excavated by a team from the Research Centre in Archaeology, Arts and Heritage Sciences (CEAACP) of the University of Coimbra and one from the University of Cambridge as part of the Kani Shaie Archaeological Project (KSAP). The team was led by Maria da Conceição Lopes, André Tomé, and Steve Renette. A step trench (Area B) was excavated on the south slope of the main mound to determine the stratigraphy, and a 15 by 15 meter excavation (Area A) was placed in the northeast quadrant of the main mound. A site survey was conducted in 2018. The publication of a final report for this excavation is currently in the publication process. Fifteen occupational layers were defined and three radiocarbon dates were obtained using the IntCal13 calibration curve:

- Level 8 - Late Chalcolithic 2 (LC 2) - 4065–3959 cal BC (jar burial)
- Level 6 - Late Chalcolithic 3 (LC 3) - 3770–3665 cal BC
- Level 4 - Late Chalcolithic 4 (LC 4) - 3530–3370 cal BC (two samples)

Markers of Uruk culture appear late in LC 2 and extend through LC 4, including numerous beveled rim bowls. This occupation layer ends in destruction by conflagration. The top of the mound was then leveled, and an Early Bronze Age settlement built. A single clay numerical tablet, heavily sealed, was found associated with the Uruk destruction level, though out of context.

Subsequently 10 samples have been AMS radiocarbon dated (using the IntCal20 calibration curve) and have generally confirmed the stratigraphy. Resumed excavations in 2024 on the main mound uncovered part of a large Early Bronze Age circular building designed to hold grain. An architectural complex appeared to be a food distribution operation. In room A of that building, 28 clay sealings were found, and in Room B, another 34 sealings. Plant remains in the complex came from barley, emmer, lentil, chickpea, and pea. Small finds included two cylinder seals dated to the end of the 4th millennium BC.

In the 2025 season a monumental Late Uruk period (c. 3300-3100) building was uncovered. It was associated with decorative clay cones, typical of Uruk Culture construction. Finds included a fragment of a gold pendant and a Uruk period cylinder seal.

== History ==
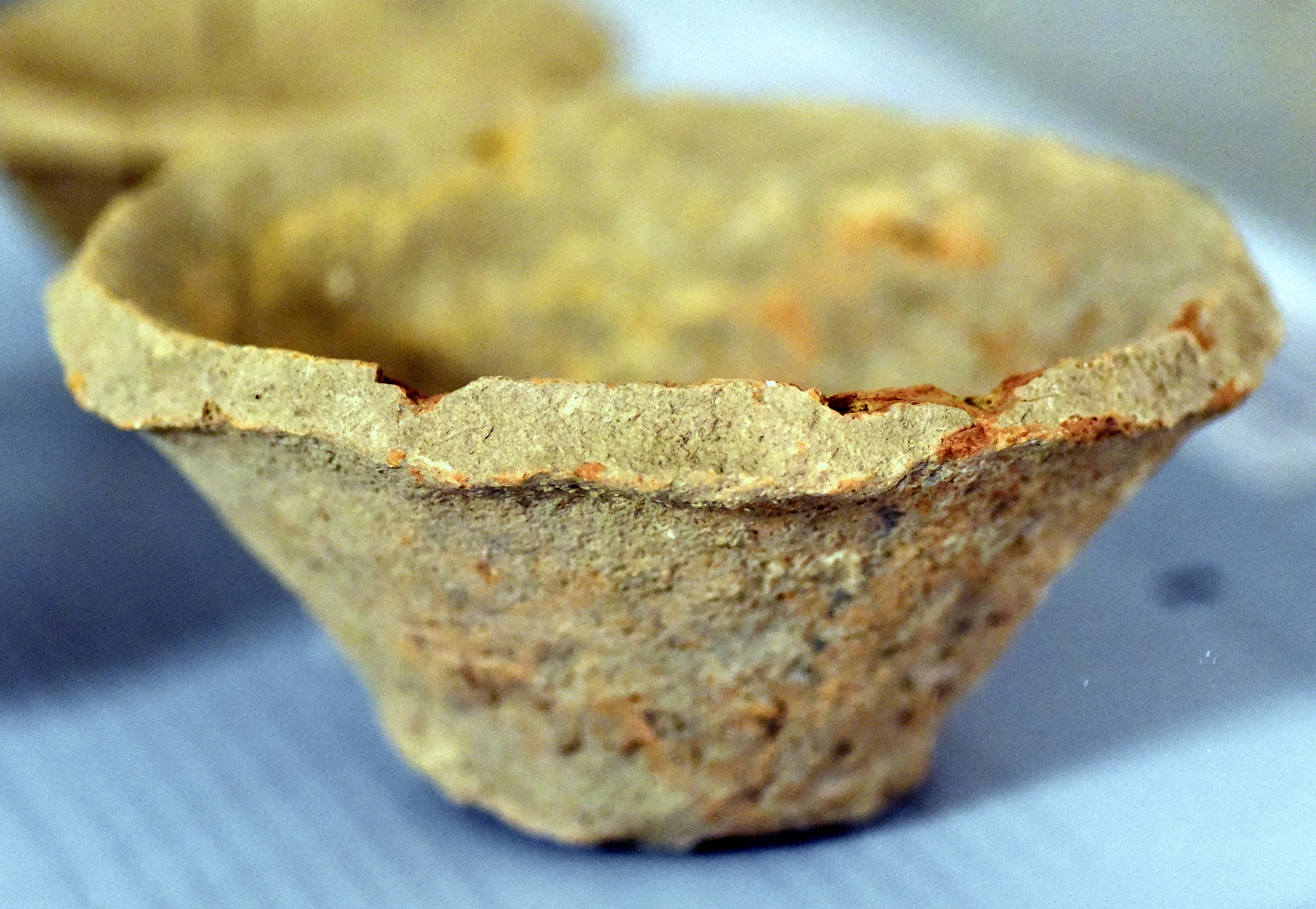
Beveled rim bowl from Logardan, Sulaymaniyah Governorate, northern Iraq. Uruk period, 4000-3100 BC. Sulaymaniyah Museum

After some modest use in the Halaf and Ubaid periods, the site of Kani Shaie was fully settled in the Uruk Period (2nd half of the 4th millennium BC), which was destroyed in a conflagration, then after a hiatus in the Early Dynastic period (early 3rd millennium BC). Some modest settlement activity occurred in the later Neo-Assyrian, Parthian, and Ottoman periods.

== See also ==
- Chogha Gavaneh
- Cities of the ancient Near East
- Grai Resh
- Jebel Aruda
- Tell al-Hawa
- Tell Kunara
- Telul eth-Thalathat
