= Girdi Qala and Logardan =

Archaeological site in Iraq

- Location within Iraq
- 35°30′59″N 44°53′1″E
- Type: settlement
- Periods: Hallaf, Ubaid, Uruk, Early Dynastic, Akkadian, Hellenistic, Sassanian, Islamic
- Location: Sulaymānīyah Governorate, Iraq

History
- Built: 5th millennium BC

Site notes
- Excavation dates: 2015-2019, 2024
- Archaeologists: Régis Vallet
- Condition: Ruined
- Owner: Public
- Public access: Yes

Girdi Qala and Logardan (a few hundred meters to the north) are adjacent ancient Near East archaeological sites in Sulaymānīyah Governorate in northeast Iraq in the Kurdistan region, parts of a complex that was occupied off and on for at least six millennia. The site lies on the west bank of the Tavuq Cay river, a tributary of the Tigris river. The nearest notable archaeological sites are Jarmo to the north and Tell Kunara to the east. It is thought that Logardan was a political and religious center while Girdi Qala contained residential (North Mound) and craft/industrial (Main Mound) areas. Girdi Qala was occupied from the Late Chacolitic I period until the Islamic period and Logardan from the Halaf period until the Islamic age. The primary occupation was during the Uruk period. The site is important for establishing the form and timing of the Uruk Expansion in a new region. Other Uruk sites in the area include Kani Shaie and Gurga Chiya. It is about 4 kilometers away from modern Chamchamal which is thought to be the location of the 3rd millennium BC site of Azuhinum.

== Archaeology ==
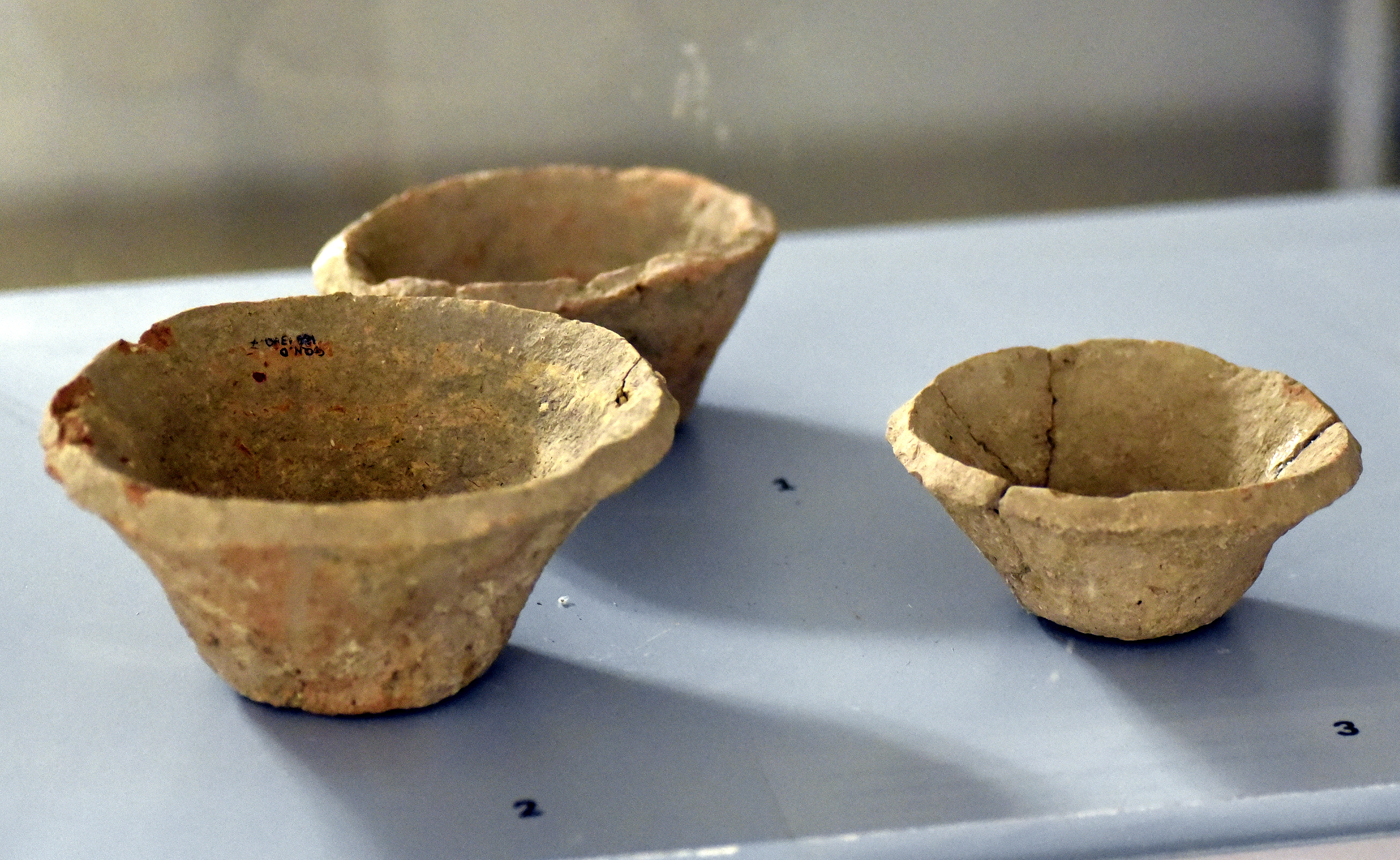
Beveled rim bowls from Logardan, Sulaymaniyah Governorate, northern Iraq. Uruk period, 4000-3100 BC. Sulaymaniyah Museum

Excavation at the site began in 2015, after brief surveys in 2014 and early 2015, by a French Archaeological Mission in the Qara Dagh team under the direction of Régis Vallet with the opening of three trenches at each site, later growing to nine trenches in total. Work has included drone-based topographic mapping and a geophysical survey which gave indications of a defensive wall. Work continued in five seasons until 2019 when it went into hiatus due to Covid and security issues. Excavation resumed in 2024.

- Girdi Qala Main Mound - A 15 meter high Main Mound (80 meters by 70 meters with an area of 0.45 hectares at the top a 140 meters by 120 meters with an area of about 1.32 hectares at the bottom) with a lower town bringing to area to about 3.25 hectares. Three trenches were opened. Trench A (abandoned after the first season) on the north edge of the summit, Trench B on the south edge of the summit, and Trench C at the bottom of the southeast slope. A stratigraphic trench at Girdi Qala found ten levels, marked by pottery kilns and associated structures. Finds included beveled rim bowls.
- Girdi Qala North Mound - Lying 150 meters to the northwest of the Main Mound. About 200 meters by 150 meters with an area of about 2 hectares. It is heavily damaged by agricultural deep plowing. One 30 meter by 5 meter trench was opened, Trench D running across the mound. A residential are occupied only in the Middle Uruk period, in ten occupational levels, and built on virgin soil. Some of the levels featured extensive hydraulic systems. Finds include Uruk period beveled rim bowls, spindle whorls, a stamp seal, flowerpots, and various residential objects. An Uruk V period numerical tablet and a number of complex tokens were also found.
- Logardan (Lat. 35°31’42.17”N/S – Long. 44°52’34.78”E/W) - North of the Girdi Qala Main Mound. It is about 225 meters by 165 meters at the summit with an overall area of about 3.7 hectares and lies on top of a 27 meter high natural hill. There are pits, some large, from recent era looting. Five trenches were opened. Trench A and Trench B on the bottom of the southwest slope and Trench C on the bottom of the southeast slope are all small, on the order of 5 meters by 10 meters. Trench D lies on the northwest edge of the mound and Trench E on the southeast edge of the mound are much larger. Work on Trench D was completed in the 2018 season. Occupation on Logardan dated back to the Hallaf period in the 6th millennium BC. A massive stone ramp dated to the first half of the 4th millennium BC was found on the southwest slope as well as a monumental acropolis on the summit. Later, in the Middle Uruk period it was repurposed for large scale food preparation and distribution with large numbers of beveled rim bowls being found. After a period of abandonment an Early Dynastic III small citadel was constructed followed in the late 3rd millennium Akkadian period by a monumental stronghold built on the summit. After destruction by fire the area was used for pottery production for several centuries with 147 kilns being found in four occupational levels. The kilns were connected by horizontal ducts. After another period of abandonment a monumental Hellenistic building was built. The final occupation was in the form of a Parthian cemetery. Small finds there included a Uruk period clay cone (used to decorate major buildings in that period) at the summit, multicolored tesserae, an Akkadian cylinder seal, a stamp seal, two Parthian/Sassanian coins, and playing dice.

== History ==
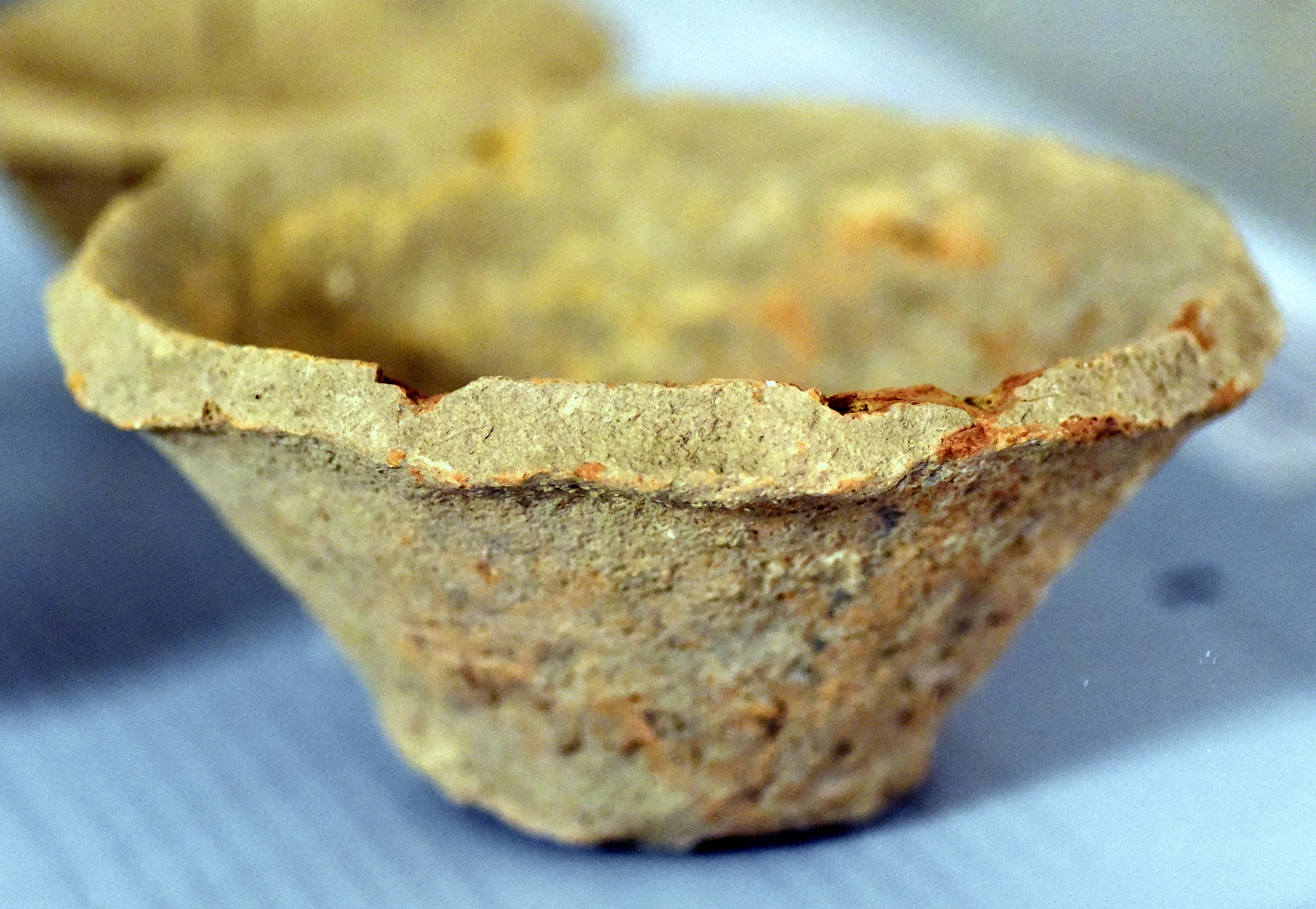
Beveled rim bowl from Logardan, Sulaymaniyah Governorate, northern Iraq. Uruk period, 4000-3100 BC. Sulaymaniyah Museum

The site was occupied beginning in the 5th millennium BC Halaf period, to a greater extent in the 4th millennium BC Ubaid period and Uruk period. Settlement activity at various levels continued through the 3rd millennium BC Early Dynastic and Akkadian periods before dropping to lower levels with periods of abandonment until the Hellenistic and Sassanian periods when it again saw significant occupation. It again saw use in the Islamic period before being fully abandoned in the 17th century BC.

== See also ==
- Chogha Gavaneh
- Cities of the ancient Near East
- Chronology of the ancient Near East
- Jebel Aruda
- Tell al-Hawa
- Grai Resh
