= Tell al-Hawa =

Archaeological site in Iraq

- Location within Iraq
- 36°48′10″N 42°28′05″E
- Type: settlement
- Periods: Uruk, Ninevite 5, Akkadian

History
- Built: 4th millennium BC

Site notes
- Excavation dates: 1986–1888
- Archaeologists: Warwick Ball, Tony Wilkinson
- Condition: Ruined
- Owner: Public
- Public access: Yes

Tell al-Hawa is an ancient Near East archaeological site on the North Jazira Plain of northern Iraq, near the border with modern-day Syria and just west of the Tigris River. It lies 40 kilometers southwest of the site of Tell Hamoukar and about 90 kilometers northwest of modern Mosul. Occupation at the site began in the 5th millennium BC Halaf period and continued, with periods of abandonment, until the Islamic period. Settlement reached a substantial size in the 4th millennium BC Uruk period and the late 3rd millennium BC Akkadian Empire period. A modern village, 26 hectares in size, lies off the east edge of the main mound. Tell al-Hawa was excavated as part of a regional rescue archaeology program resulting from the completion of the Mosul Dam and the subsequent expansion of irrigated agriculture. Beveled rim bowls, diagnostic of the Uruk Culture, were found at the site.

== Archaeology ==
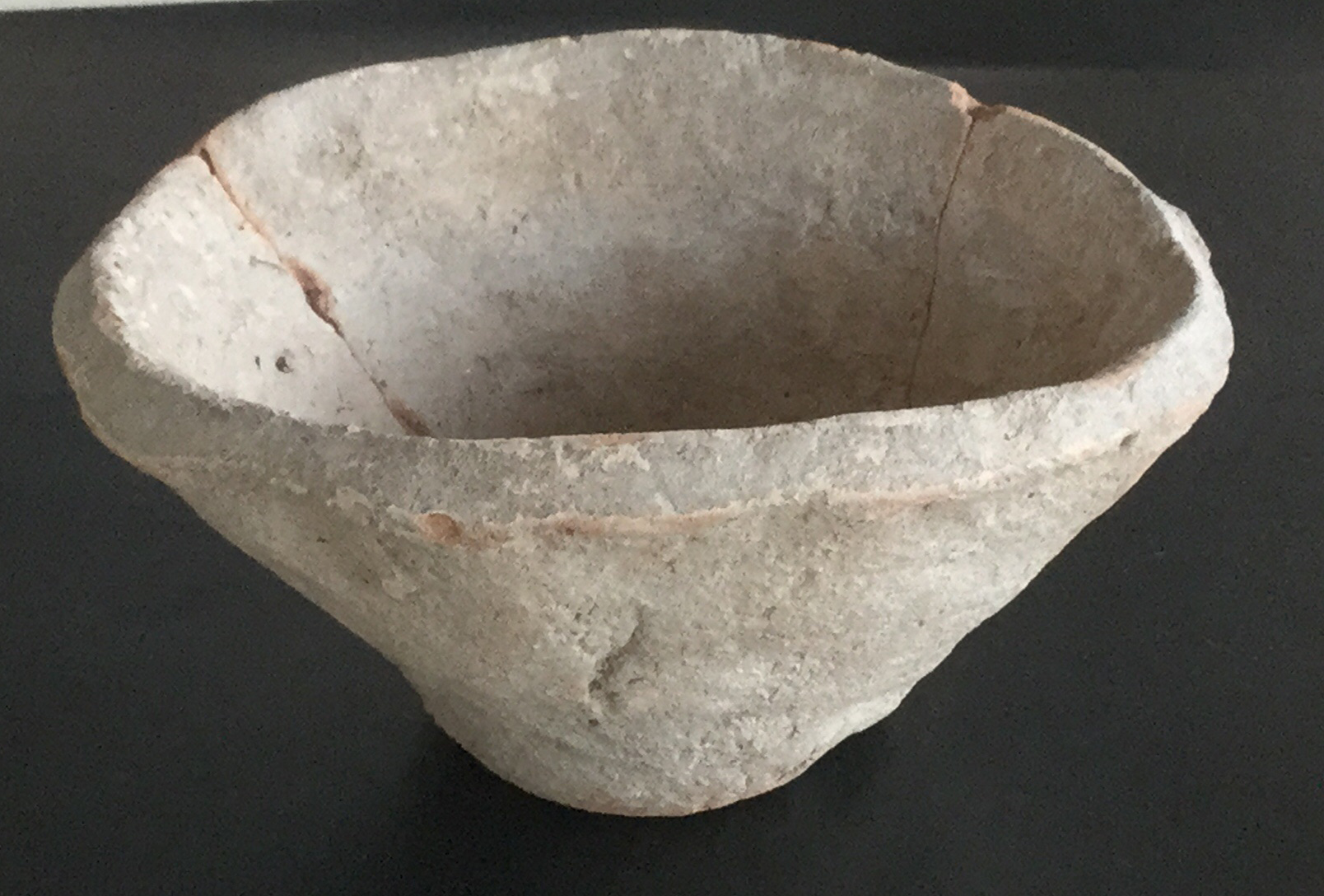
Uruk period beveled rim bowl

Tell al-Hawa consists of a 20-hectare upper town (Acropolis) rising 30 meters above the plain and an 80-hectare lower town, which includes multiple small mounds, together having an area of about 100 hectares. The Acropolis is about 6 hectares in area and is disturbed by recent cuts and a modern cemetery with 300 marked graves. A partly graveled strip of road cuts into the south slope of the main mound. The site was first mentioned (as Tall Howa) by James Silk Buckingham in the early 1800s. Sir Aurel Stein noted the large size of the site during his aerial survey of the area in 1938.

"Among the mounds Tall Hawa and Tall Chilparat are so large as to indicate sites of considerable settlements dating from a very early period, but probably occupied also down to Roman times. In the case of Tall Hawa which rises to more than 70 feet plenty of ancient pottery, including painted sherds which may be prehistoric in type were picked up on the steep slopes"

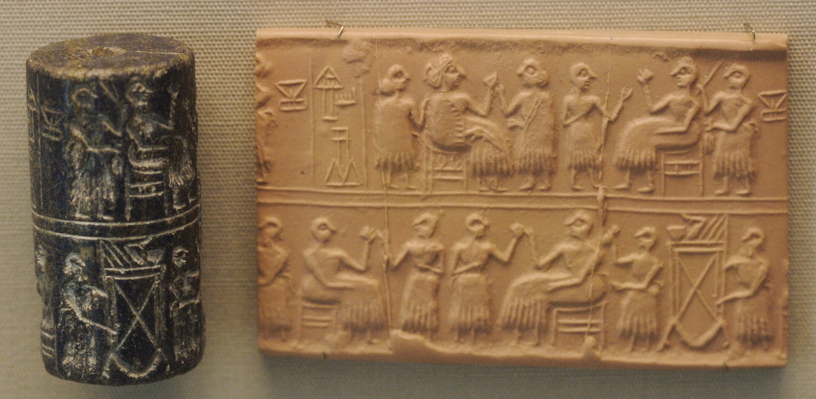
Example of a cylinder seal

Also in 1938, Tell al-Hawa was examined by Seton Lloyd who reported it having a diameter at the base of 500 meters and being generally 25 meters high. He noted monumental construction (with large baked slightly plano-convex bricks described as Akkadian-type) on the northeast end of the Acropolis. He also found a large quantity of ceramic shards dating from the prehistoric through the Neo-Assyrian periods. In the late 1960s, the Iraqi Directorate-General of Antiquities surveyed the region. Tell al-Hawa (Site #862) was reported as having "Ubaid, Uruk, Jamdat Nasr and Late Assyrian material".

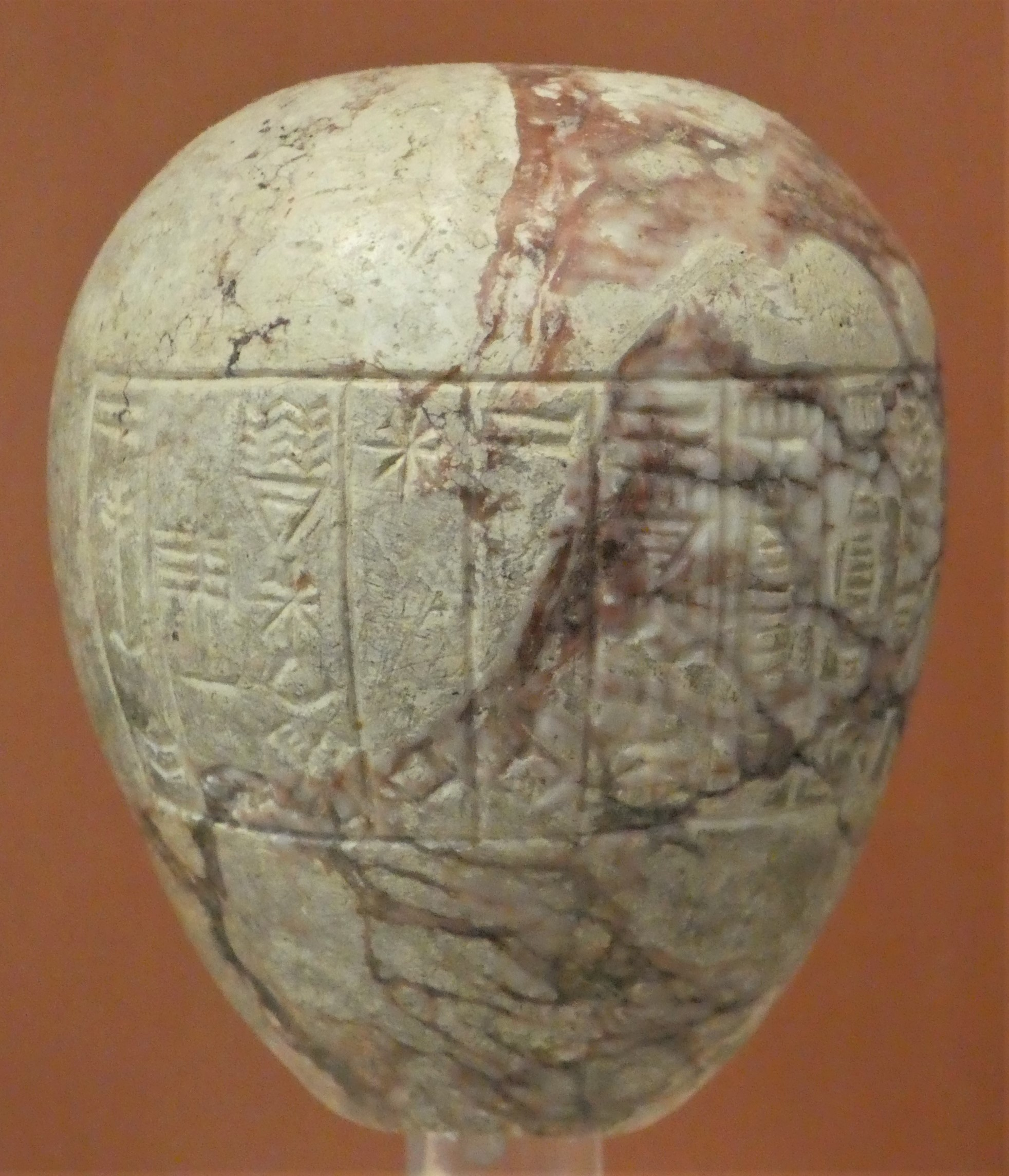
Example of a Mesopotamian macehead

The site was excavated in three seasons from 1986 to 1988 by a British Archaeological Expedition to Iraq team led by Warwick Ball and Tony Wilkinson as part of the North Jazira project triggered by the construction of the Mosul Dam. Water from that dam was planned to be distributed by pipelines and canals to support agriculture and new settlements, which endangered numerous archaeological sites. Work began with an intensive field survey of the site and a coarse-grained survey of the 130 square kilometers surrounding Tell al-Hawa. Three areas were excavated on top of the main mound AA (to the east), AB (to the southeast), and AC (to the west), each with several small trenches. Several meters of AB had been bulldozed off in modern times to flatten the area. Area AA found Middle Assyrian restorations of a Khabur period monumental building. Area AB found a ziggurat platform, thought to originate in the Mitanni period, with later restorations. Reed mats were placed between the mudbrick layers. Finds included mace heads (one of serpentine), cylinder seals, frit masks, a bronze bracelet, and a large number of beads. A number of small excavations were made in the lower town, primarily at areas C, D, and E, to the north. In the lower town, a single sounding, Trench LP, was put in to the east of the main mound and west of the modern village, and finds included obsidian blades and a clay sealing.

A number of inscribed clay cones (sikkatu) were found at the site marking the rebuilding of the temple of Adad by the Neo-Assyrian ruler Shalmaneser III. An administrative building, ziggurat, and temple to Adad is known to have been at that site in the Middle Assyrian period. It has been suggested that at this time the region controlled by the site was called Katmuḫi and the site itself named Šaḫuppâ. Also recovered was a damaged top half of an Old Babylonian cuneiform tablet, not found in a stratigraphic context in Area D, which mentions the toponyms Hadnum and Shuruzi and an ostracon, found in Area AB with a short Neo-Assyrian period inscription.

=== Subsidiary mounds ===
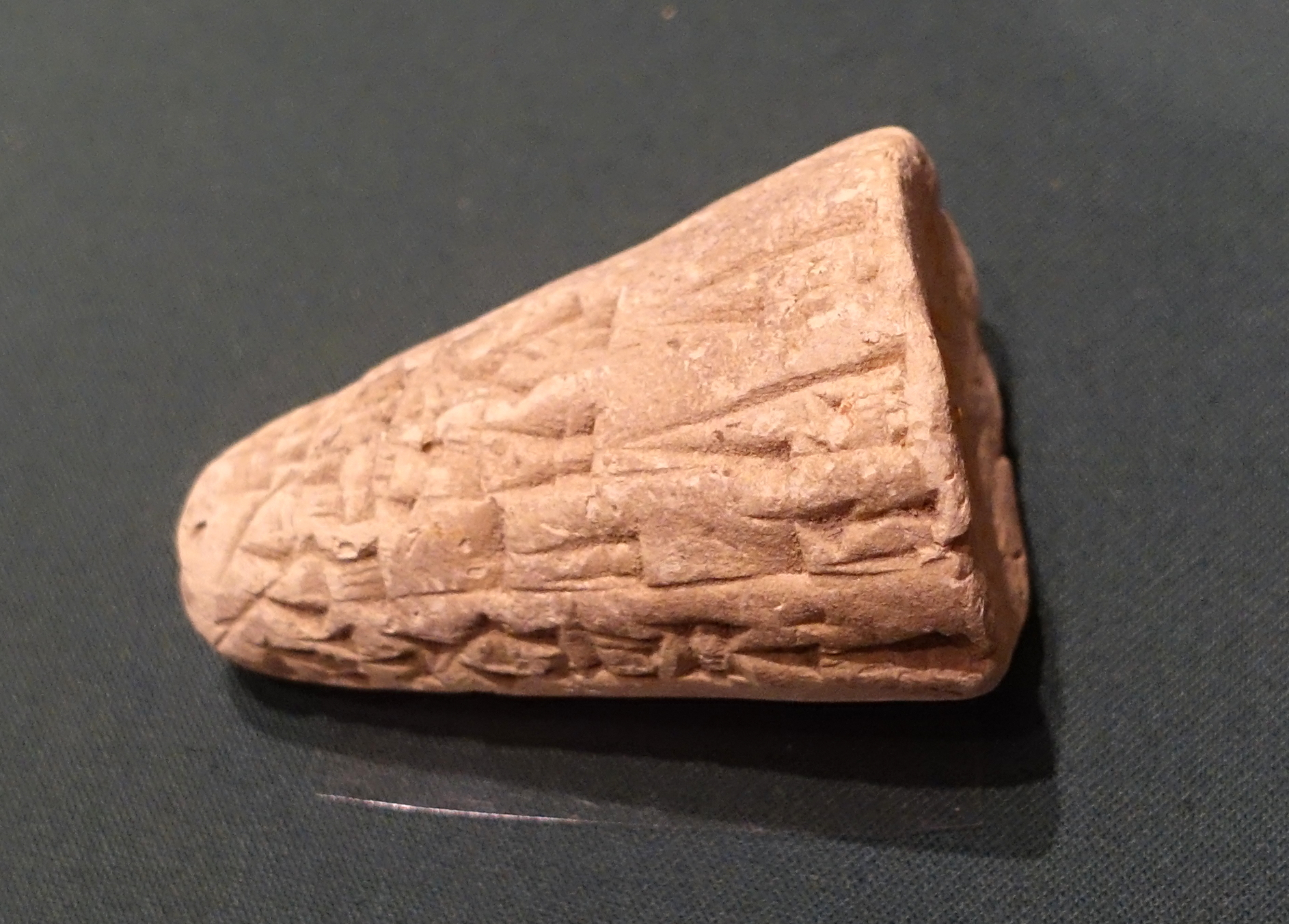
Sikkatu example

- Tell al-Hawa South - 2 kilometers south of Tell al-Hawa, 1 hectare, Islamic period, excavated by Sd. Dhanun Yunis in 1988
- Tell al-Hawa North - 2 kilometers northeast of Tell al-Hawa, group of low mounds, Hellenistic period, excavated by Sd. Abd al-Sam'an in 1988
- Tell al-Hawa East - 3 kilometers southeast of Tell al-Hawa, "prominent", Neo-Assyrian period, excavated by Sd. Ma'num Ghanim in 1988

== History ==
Uruk expansion and colonial outposts

The site was occupied in the Hassuna period (small), Halaf period, Ubaid period, Uruk period (significant), Ninevite 5 period (moderate), Akkadian Empire period (significant), a period of abandonment where North Mesopotamia experienced depopulation from c 2200 BC to c. 1800 BC, Khabur, Mitanni / Middle Assyrian, Neo-Assyrian periods (small), then after a period of abandonment, small Parthian, Sasanian, and Islamic period occupations. Tell al-Hawa covered an area of about 15 hectares in the Ubaid period, then reached a size of 50 hectares in the Uruk period, and was surrounded by a number of villages ranging up to 7 hectares in size. The site grew at least 66 hectares in the 3rd and 2nd millennia BC (24 hectares in the Ninevite 5 period and reaching a peak in the Akkadian Empire period), accompanied by the disappearance of small sites in the area in the late 3rd millennium BC. Occupation in the Mitanni/Middle Assyrian period through the Neo-Assyrian was modest and appears to have largely functioned as a cultic site, possibly becoming a small provincial capital toward the end.

It has been suggested that the site was the location of the Isin-Larsa period city of Razama. It has also been proposed that in the 1st millennium BC it was the Neo-Assyrian provincial capital of Tillule (Tille). Another proposal is that the name of the site in the Khabur period was Kiskis.

== See also ==
- Cities of the ancient Near East
- Chronology of the ancient Near East
- Girdi Qala and Logardan
- Grai Resh
- Proto-cuneiform
