= Tell Kunara =

Akkadian–Lullubian archaeological site in Iraq

- Location within Iraq
- 35°31′10″N 45°21′34″E
- Type: settlement
- Periods: Bronze Age
- Cultures: Akkadian, Ur III, Isin-Larsa
- Location: Iraq

History
- Built: c. 2300 BC

Site notes
- Excavation dates: 2012–2013, 2015-2019, 2022-2023
- Archaeologists: C. Kepinski, Aline Tenu
- Condition: Ruined
- Owner: Public
- Public access: Yes

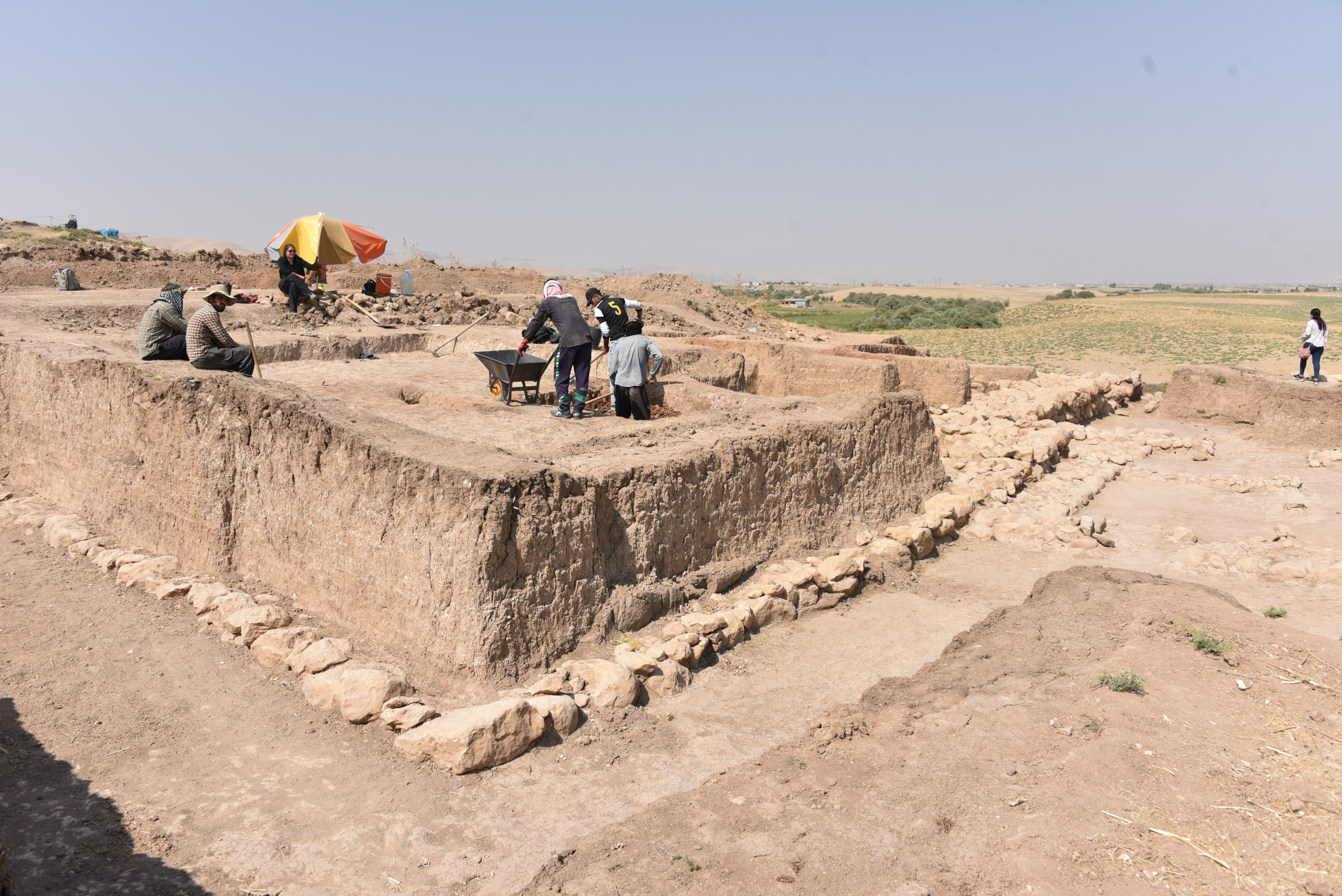
French Excavations at Tell Kunara, 2300–2000 BC. Sulaymaniyah Governorate, Iraq, 3 October 2019

Tell Kunara is an ancient Near East archaeological site about 10 kilometers southwest of Sulaymaniyah in the Kurdistan region of Iraq. It lies on the Tanjaro River. The site was occupied from the Chalcolithic period to the early second millennium BC.

== History ==
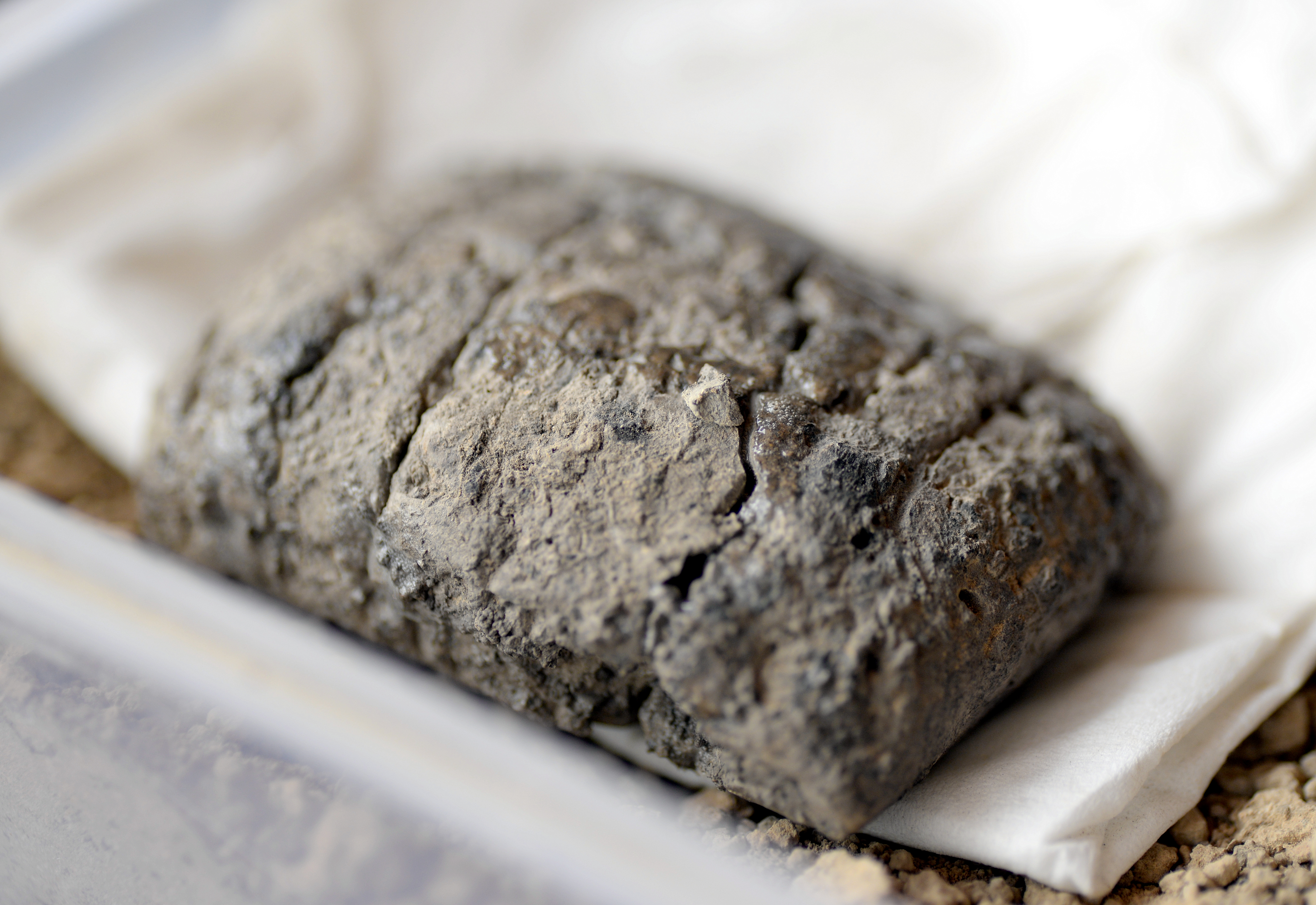
Clay tablet, freshly excavated, covered with mud to protect it. From Tell Kunara, Sulaymaniyah, Iraq,, 2300–2000 BC. Now in the Sulaymaniyah Museum

The site was occupied in the Akkadian, Ur III, and Isin-Larsa periods. The excavators have speculated that the city, with its monumental buildings, was the capital of the Lullubi state. Initially there were three excavation levels defined (levels 1 and 2 have been radiocarbon dated)

- Level 1 – Middle Bronze Age (2000–1900 BC) (in Area C)
- Level 2 – End of Early Bronze (2200–2000 BC) (in Areas, B, and E)
- Level 3 – Early Bronze Age (2350–2200 BC) (in Areas A and D)

Excavators have now detailed an occupation history for the entire site as

- Period I: Medieval or Early Modern Period
- Period II: Iron Age
- Period III: 2nd millennium BC
- Period IV: Late 3rd millennium BC
- Period V: Circa 2200-2100 BC
- Period VI: Mid 3rd millennium BC

Epigraphic evidence shows the city had an ensi (governor) but under what auspices is unknown at present. A Sukkal (high level dignitary) was also known to be present.

== Archaeology ==
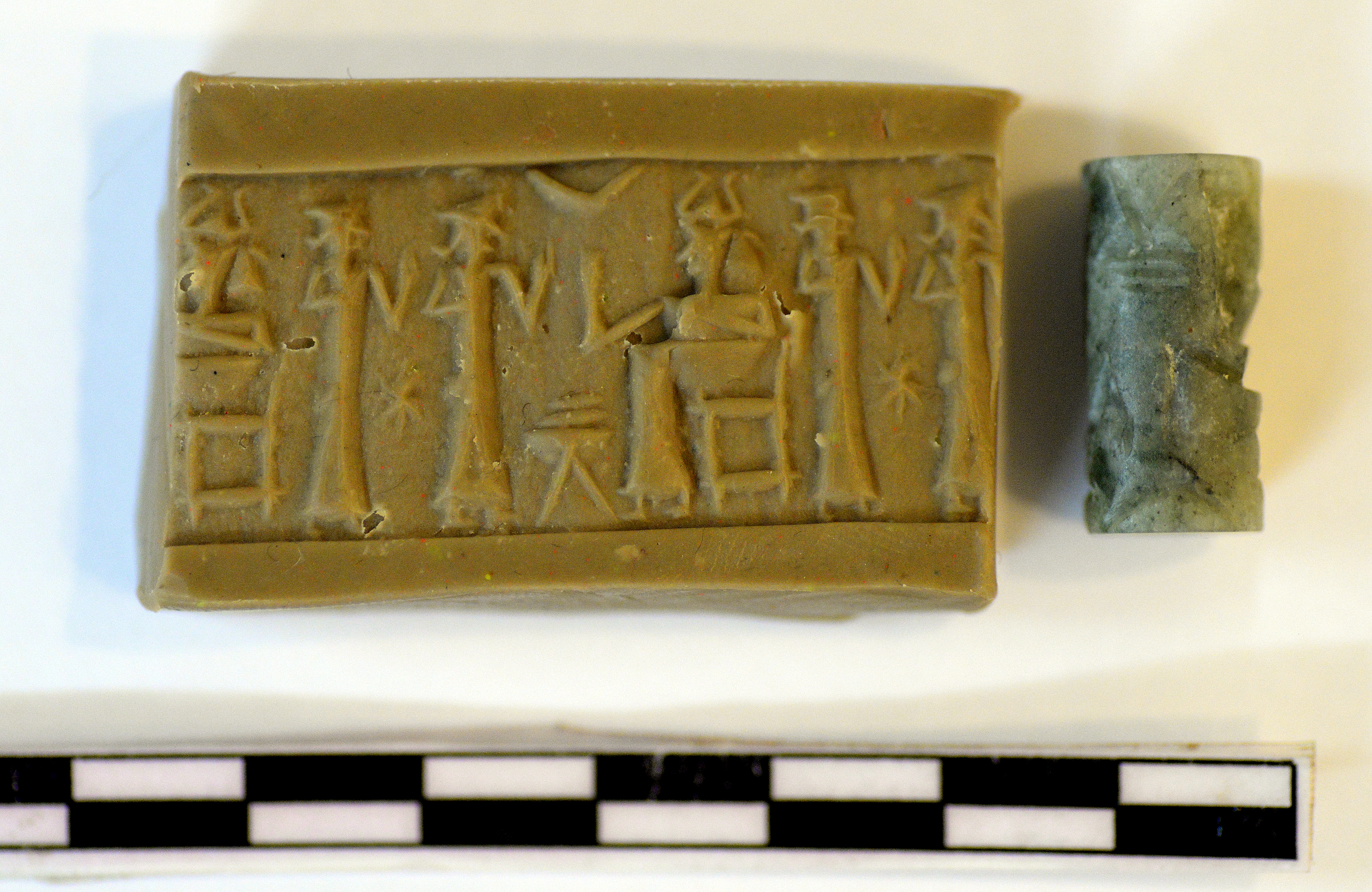
Akkadian cylinder seal, late third-millennium BC, From Tell Kunara, Tanjro Valley, Sulaymaniyah, Iraq. Sulaymaniyah Museum

Tell Kunara consists of two oval mounds, the western one higher than the eastern, separated by a modern road. The western mound is designated as the Upper Town (excavation area A) and the eastern mound is designated as the Lower Town (excavation areas B, C, D, and E). Overall the site extends to roughly 600 meters by 400 meters or about 10 hectares. The site was first visited in 1943 when Sabri Shukri of the Iraqi General Directorate of Antiquities in Baghdad conducted a survey, issuing a report dated November 10, 1943.

The site was examined as part of a larger survey by C. Kepinski in 2011. A geomagnetic survey at Tell Kunara showed signs of a monumental (60 meters by 30 meters) building in the Lower Town It has been excavated in nine seasons since 2012 by a French National Center for Scientific Research team led by Christine Kepinski and Aline Tenu. Since 2012 excavation has mainly focused on the lower town. A few 10 centimeter by 10 centimeter cuneiform tablets were found in 2015 in Area C (most concerning flour) and 70 more tablets and fragments in 2017, and another group in 2018 in Area E (most concerning grain) bringing the total to around 100. Volume quantities were listed in a new type of gur (GUR of Šubartu) not previously attested as opposed to the expected Akkadian Empire GUR. The 2018 season consisted of a study session on the tablets and tablet fragments discovered in 2017. followed by excavations in areas in Areas B, C, and E. Work continued in 2019 with a study mission followed by excavation from September 14 to October 13, in Areas B, C, and E. The latest excavation seasons were in 2022 and 2023.

- Area A – On the upper mound. A monumental building (1105) was found, with a 2.6 meter wide wall built on a very large stone base foundation. The walls were constructed of "layers of rectangular mud bricks, protected by diluted bitumen and jointed with a mortar containing crushed bones, alternated with about 0.60 m of pisé". The building, which overlays an earlier one with similar plan, was fronted by a 100 square meter courtyard with included a 10-meter terracotta pipe for drainage. The top of the mound had first been sealed and leveled by a several meter thick layer of sand. Small finds included a bronze pendant.
- Area B – In the Lower Town, designed to explore the monumental building (Building B.712) identified by the survey. A simple poorly preserved building was found on Level 1. On level 2 lay the monumental building that had appeared on the survey. It had 1.6 meter thick wall footings made out of massive stones with facing stones. Rather than a single building it turned out to be 4 buildings joined together, in an orthogonal layout, by pebbled pathways. The remains of the building on Level 3 had large walls on a completely different orientation. Small finds included bronze pins, beads, molds for casting bronze blades, lithic artifacts, and a finely carved greenish Akkadian period stone cylinder seal.
- Area C – A large but shallow excavation at the outer edge of the site. Iron Age pottery shards were found at the surface level and radiocarbon dating of material returned c. 1110−909 BC. To the south, Level 1 remains are fragmentary but appear to be related to food production. Levels 2 and 3 so portions of a monumental building with walls 1.4 meters in width. At the lowest floor were many storage jars. A number of fragmentary cuneiform tablets were found.
- Area D – several narrow trenches on the slope of the Lower Town to look for a defensive wall and examine the interrelationship with the Upper Town. Small finds here included beads, an obsidian flint, a lithic arrow head of Akkadian type.
- Area E - In the northern part of the Lower town. A single occupation level. A monumental building (damaged during the construction of the modern road and other buildings possibly lost) and a small house were found. The monumental building had walls are least 20 meters long, with stone footings. The house was about 36 square meters in area with three rooms. The largest room was about 15 square meters. A number of cuneiform tablets were found in this area.

== Excavation photographs ==
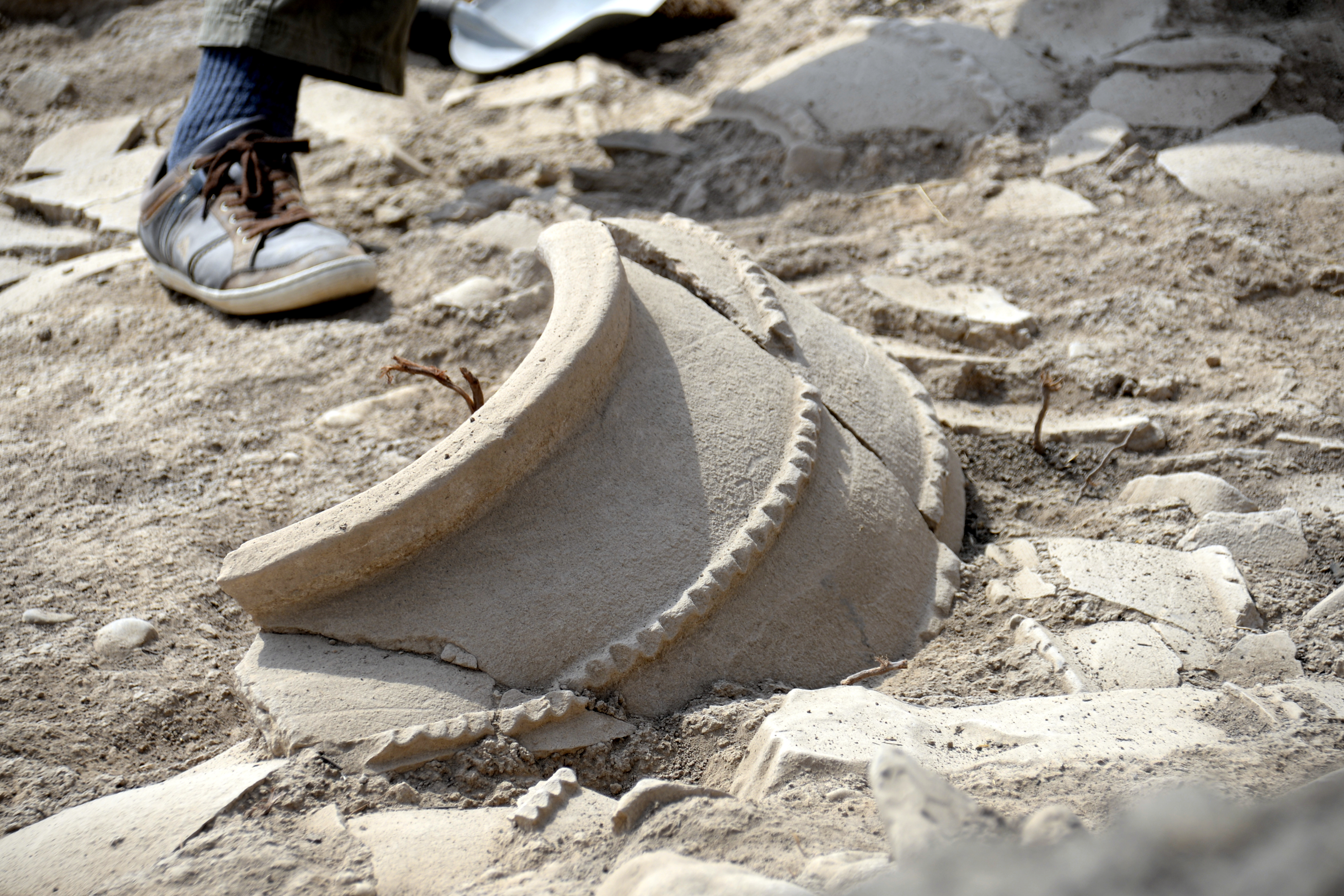
French excavations at Tell Kunara, 2300–2000 BC, Oct. 2015

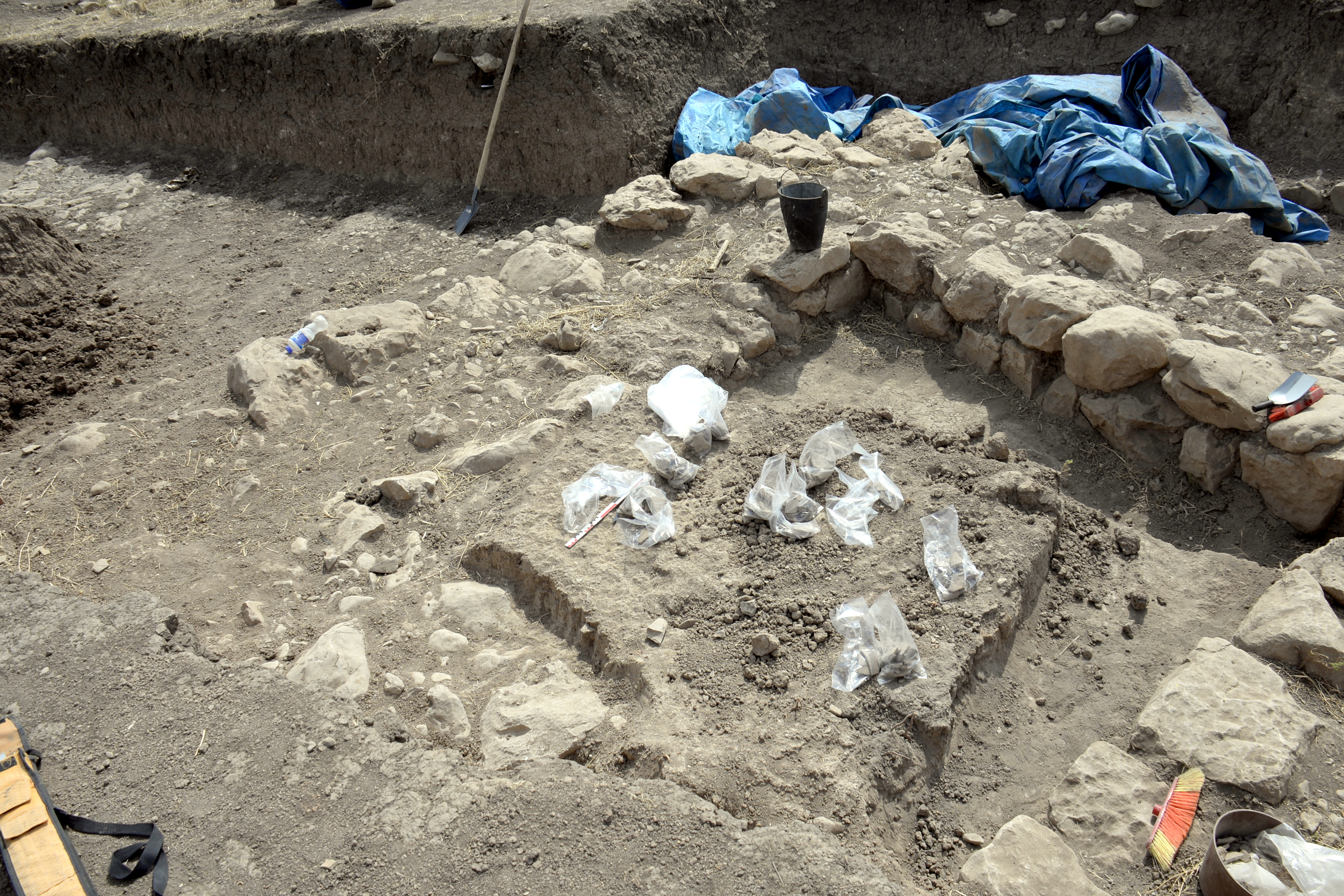
French excavations at Tell Kunara. 2300–2000 BC, Oct. 2015

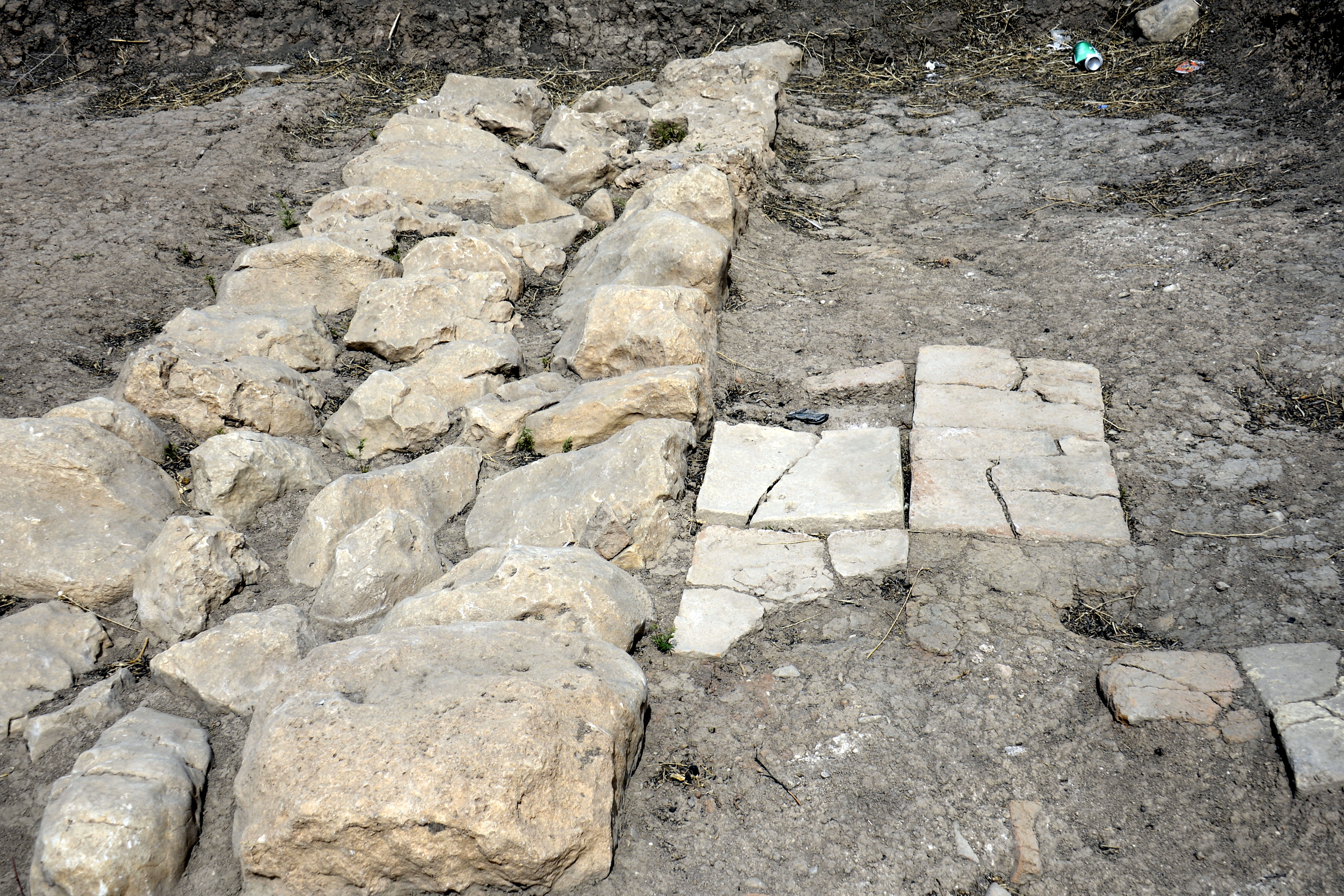
Wall. Excavations at Tell Kunara, 2300–2000 BC

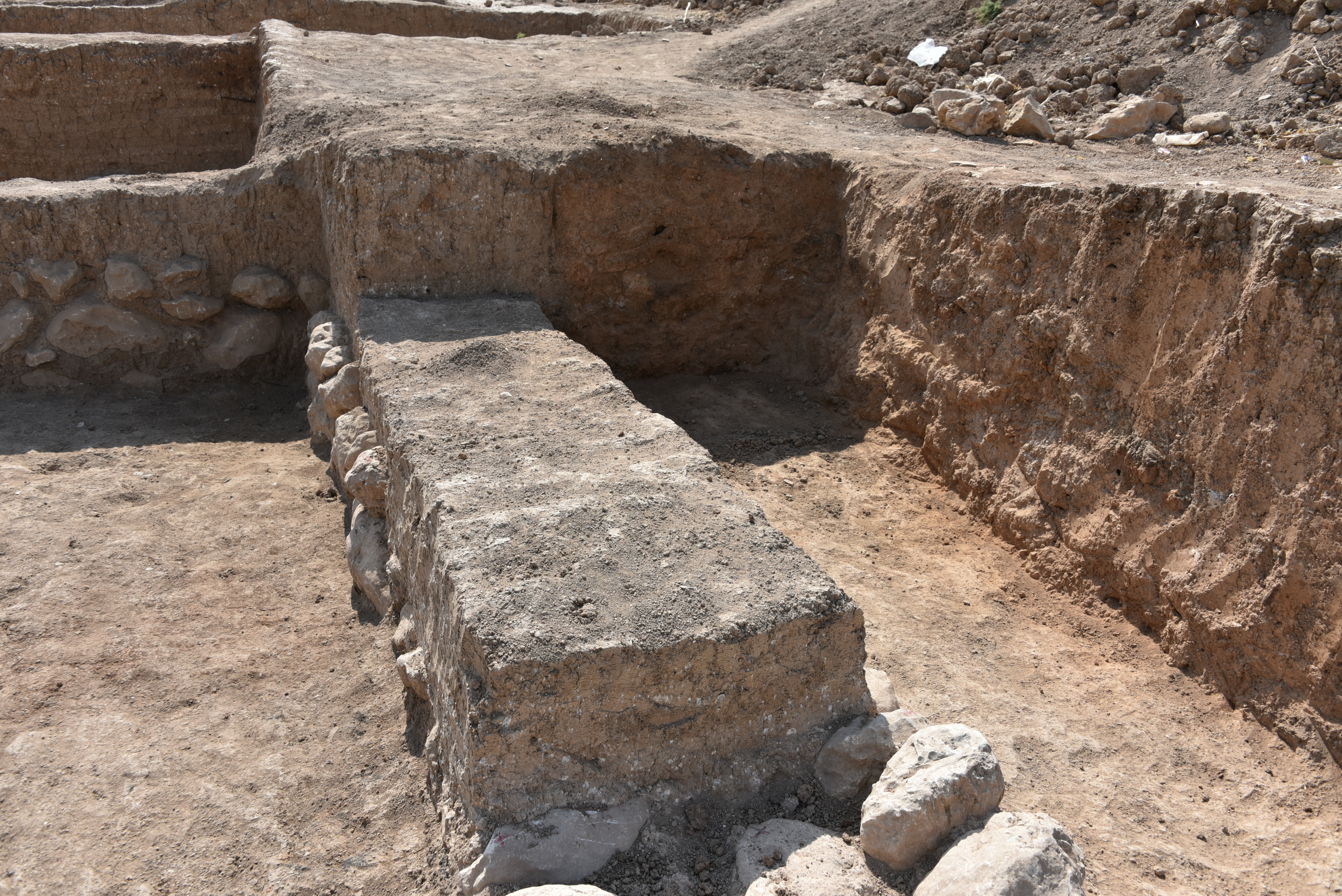
Excavations at Tell Kunara. 2300–2000 BC, October 3, 2019

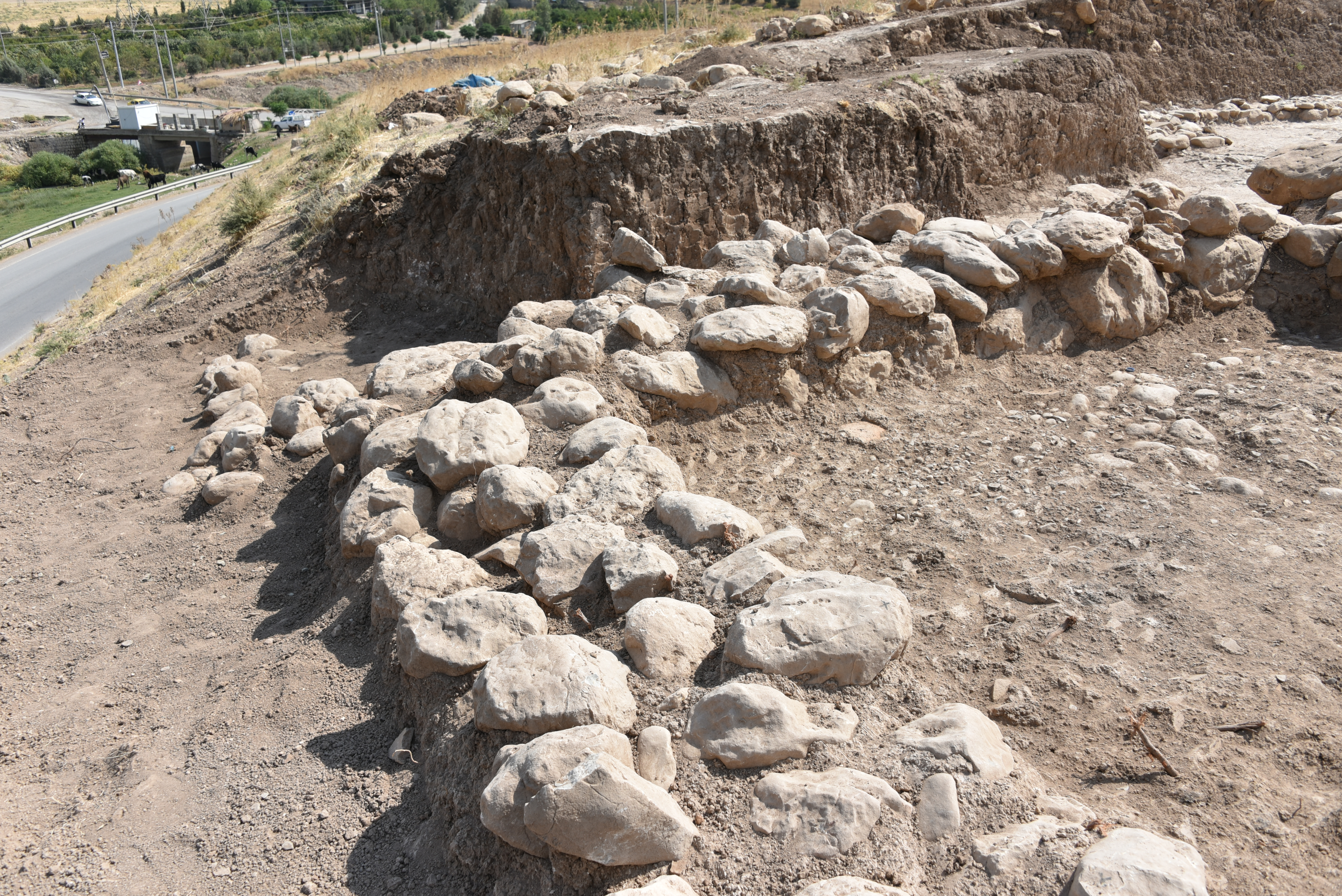
Excavations at Tell Kunara. 2300–2000 BC., October 3, 2019

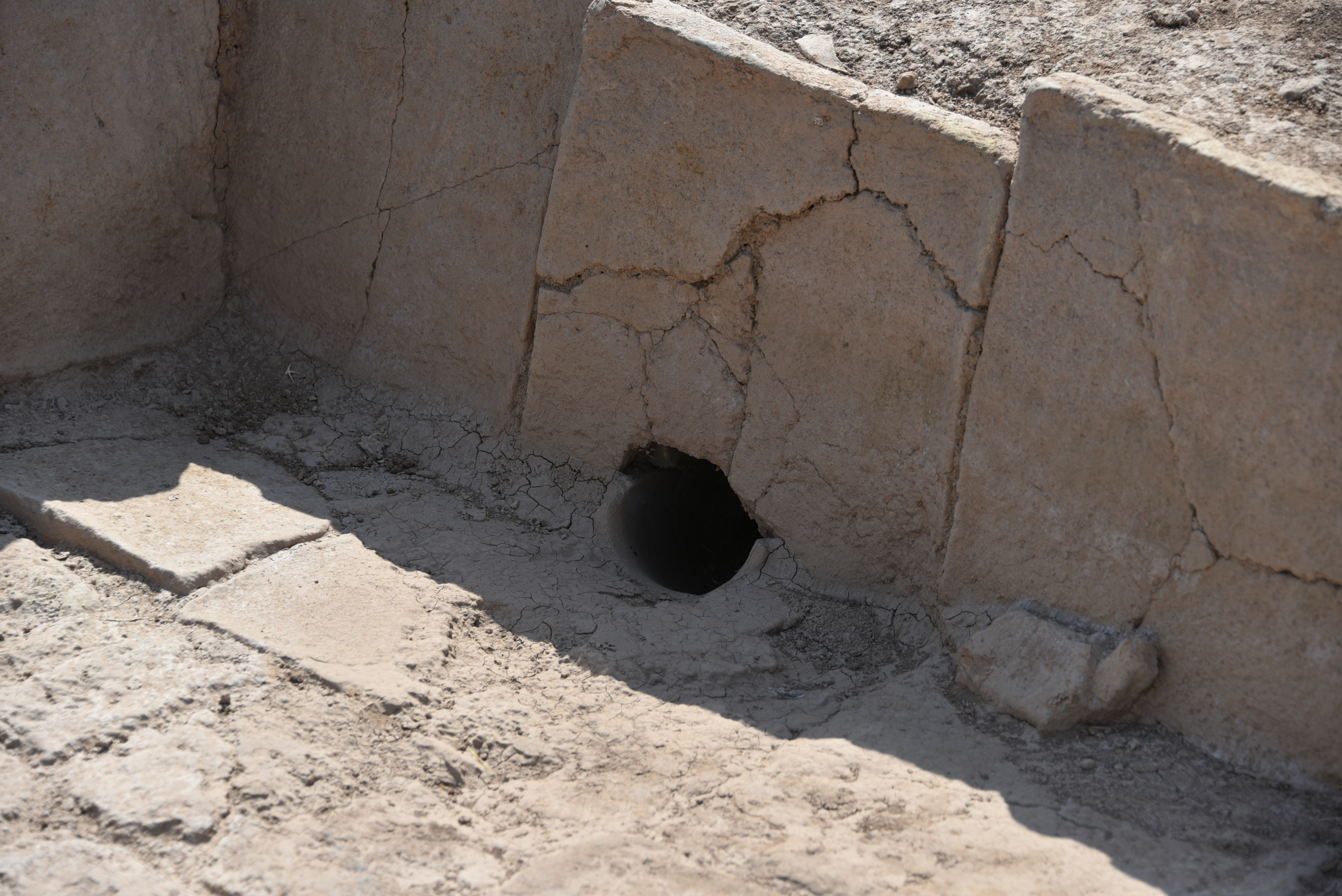
Drainage system. Excavations at Tell Kunara. 2300–2000 BC, October 3, 2019

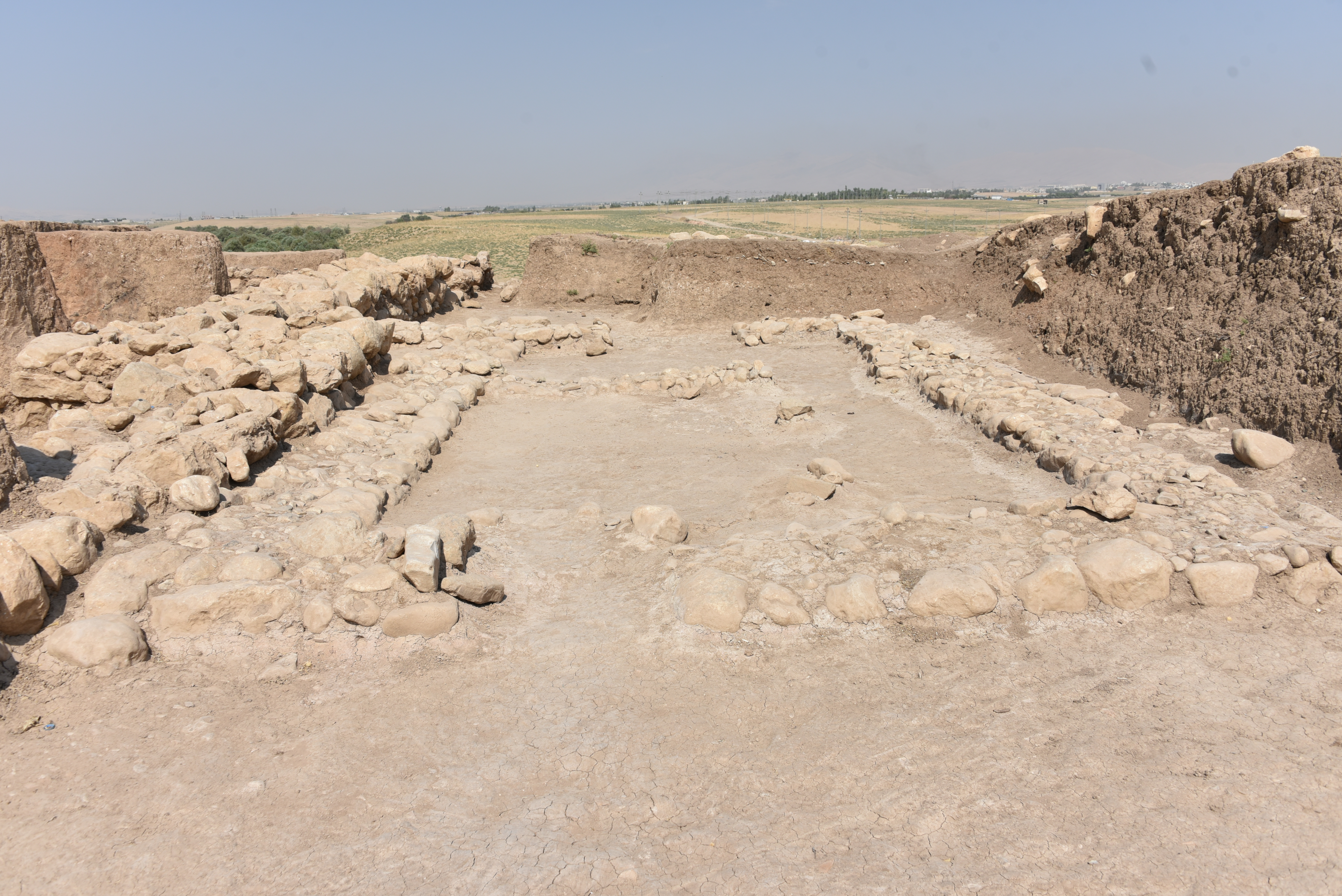
Foundation-walls. Excavations at Tell Kunara. 2300–2000 BC, October 3, 2019

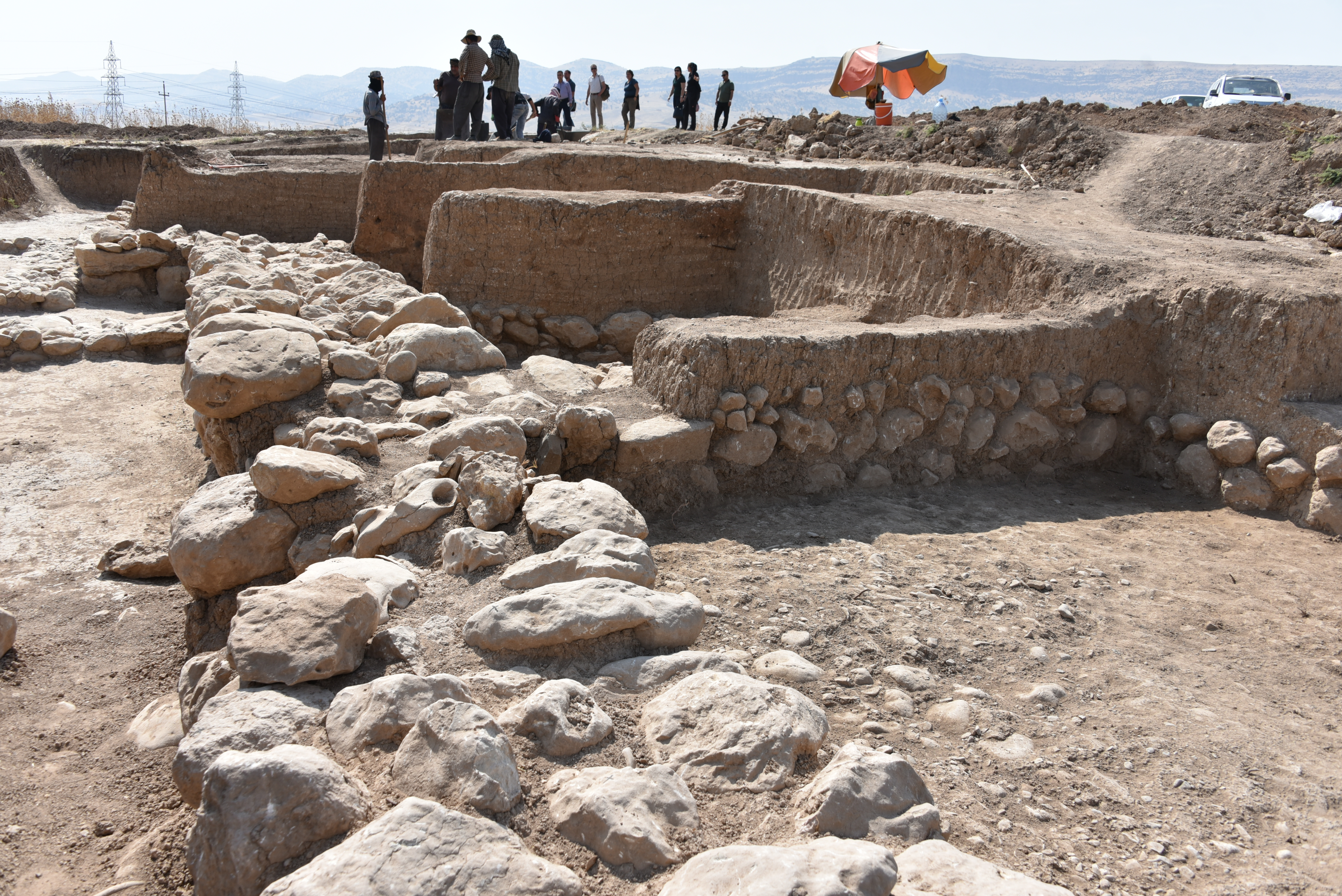
French Excavations at Tell Kunara. 2300–2000 BC, October 3, 2019

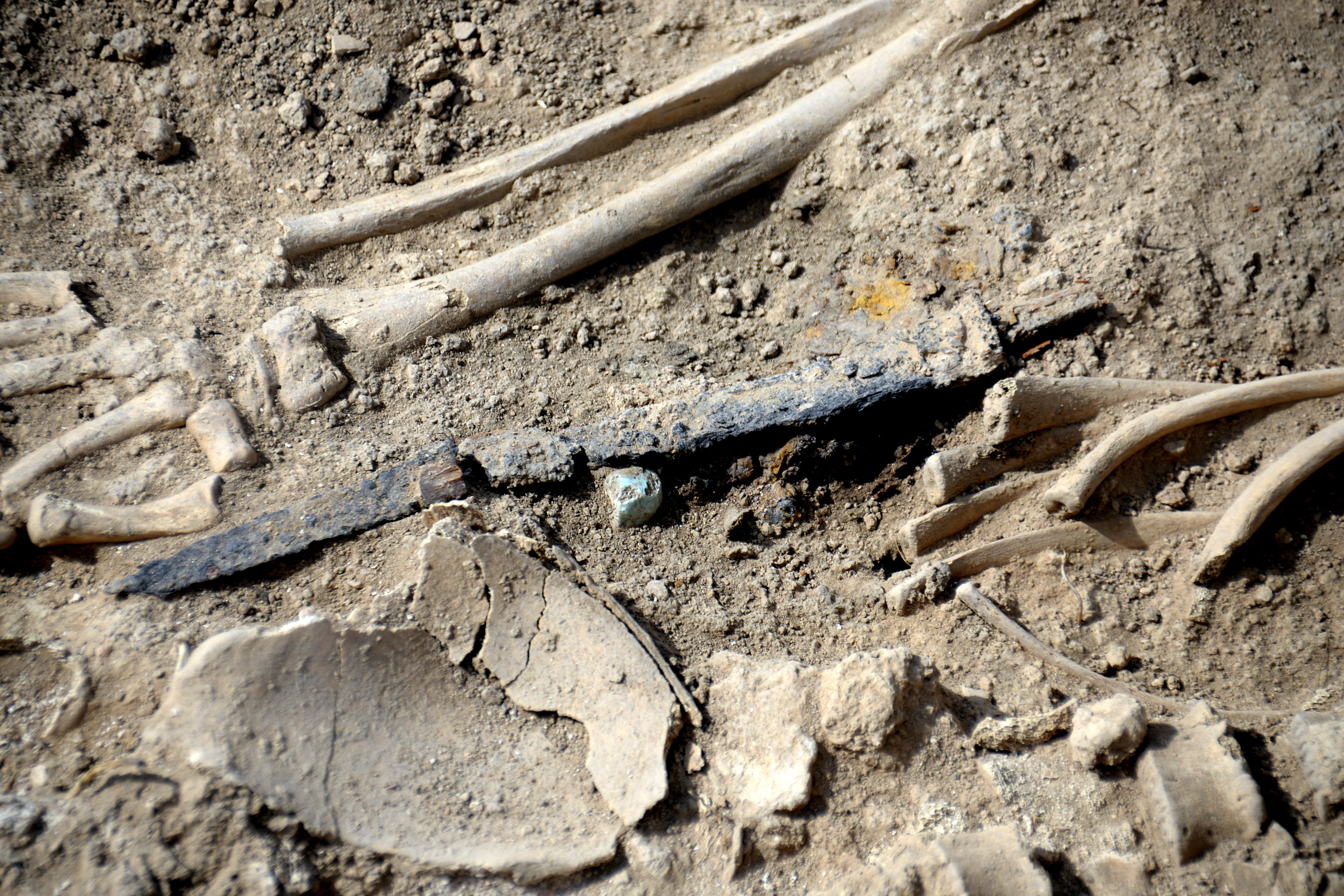
A dagger, a turquoise piece, and a skeleton. Excavations at Tell Kunara, 2300–2000 BC

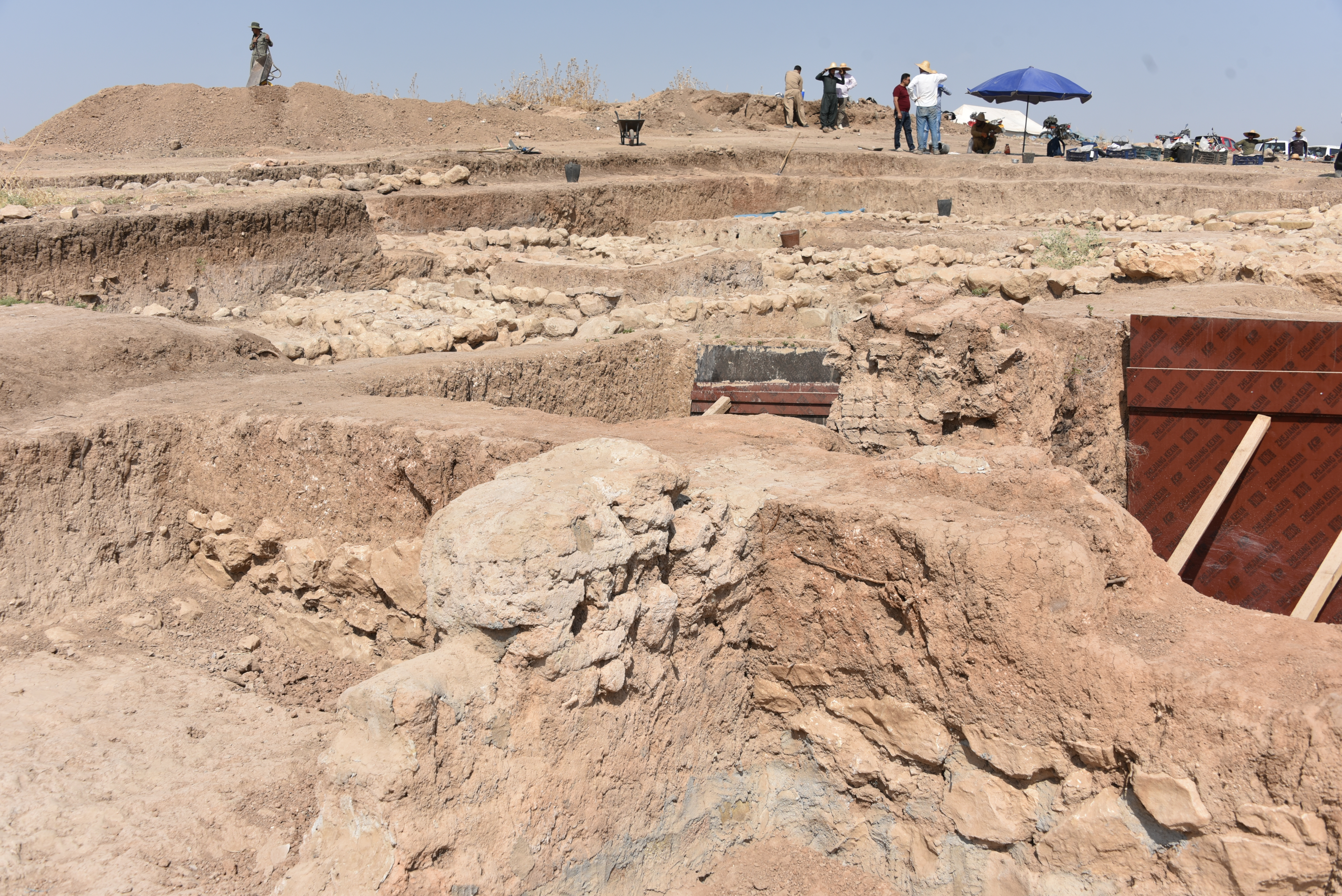
Excavations at Tell Kunara. 2300–2000 BC, October 3, 2019

== See also ==
- Cities of the ancient Near East
- Ancient Mesopotamian units of measurement
