= Chogha Gavaneh =

Archaeological site in Iran

- Location within Iran
- 34°20′13″N 47°05′28″E
- Type: settlement
- Periods: Neolithic, Late Chalcolithic, Bronze Age
- Location: Kermanshah Province, Iran

History
- Built: Late 3th millennium BC

Site notes
- Excavation dates: 1967, 1970, 1980, 1998–1999
- Archaeologists: Mahmoud Kordavani, Kamyar Abdi
- Condition: Ruined
- Owner: Public
- Public access: Yes

The site of Chogha Gavaneh, on two major routes, one between south and central Mesopotamia and Iran and the other between northern Mesopotamia and the Susa are, lies within the modern city of Eslamabad-e Gharb (formerly Harunabad/Shahabad-e Gharb) in Kermanshah Province in Iran and about 60 kilometers west of modern Kermanshah. It was occupied from the Early Neolithic Period to Middle Bronze Age and, after a time of abandonment, in the Islamic period.

== Archaeology ==
Chogha Gavaneh, which reached a size of about 40 hectares in the Bronze Age, has now been mostly destroyed by local inhabitants and now covers at most 4 hectares, rising 25 meters above the plain. By the Middle Chalcolithic period the site had reached a size of about 3 hectares. There is a "high mound" and a "lower town" (now covered by the modern city). The 40 hectares estimate comes from an aerial photograph of the site taken in 1936 by archaeologist Eric Schmidt before Chogha Gavaneh was engulfed by the city.

The site was first excavated in 1967 when a team from the Archaeological Service of Iran opened a step trench on the northeast side of the high mound. Salvage excavations were conducted in 1970 by an Archaeological Service of Iran team led by Mahmoud Kordavani. A 0.8 hectare area was opened on the high mound revealing an architectural complex, partly destroyed by modern activities, and finding a number of cuneiform tablets. The buildings were similar to those found in Mesopotamia in this period. A short season of work was conducted in 1980 by a team from the Iranian Center for Archaeological Research as destruction by locals had continued. Local inhabitants were destroying the site and had already removed several meters off the high mound to build a tea house. A hummock was built on the mound during the Iran-Iraq War of 1980–1988 to install an anti-aircraft battery. Small exploratory excavations were conducted in 1998 and 1999 led by Kamyar Abdi. In one small (3 meters by 0.9 meters by 5.20 meters) trench on the western edge Late Neolithic to Late Middle Chalcolithic material were found. In a second trench there were four Bronze Age occupation levels and below that Uruk period pottery including bevelled rim bowls (also found in a surface survey). A final sounding east of the high mound revealed Bronze Age levels and Iron Age III through Parthian levels. The room where cuneiform tablets had been found in 1970 was also re-excavated. Small finds included 35 zoomorphic figurines (sheep, goat, cattle, dog, wild donkey/horse, and gazelle), 34 geometric objects, and 18 sling bullets (egg shaped and spherical).

=== Epigraphics ===
Cuneiform tablets, along with a cylinder seal, were found (Room Β15) in the 1970 excavation, 56 tablets and 28 fragments and are now held in the Iran National Muséum in Tehran. The tablets were mostly worn and broken and were found in a fill context from a single room in a large building. Initially some of the cuneiform tablets were thought to be from the Neo-Assyrian period but that later was corrected to the early 18th century BC as were the rest of the tablets. After the latest excavation the tablets from the original 1970 dig were collated, translated, and published. The tablets were written in the Akkadian language with the occasional Sumerograms typical in this period. The only deity explicitly mentioned was ^{d}Iškur (Adad) in the cylinder seal which read "Semitum, daughter of Nuriri, servant-girl of Adad". The tablets included 30 toponyms (town names), none occurring more than twice, which provided no insight into the city's name. One toponym, Me-Turan, lies 141 kilometers to the east with. The cities of Haburâtum, Der, and Akkad are also mentioned. The tablets also held 178 personal names, mostly Akkadian but including a few (13) Amorite names. Most of the tablets are on agricultural products or for administrative functions. It is thought the site survived on the "raising of sheep and the cultivation of grain, as well as perhaps by the production of textiles in workshops staffed primarily by women". An example text:

"Seven Amorite mandu-soldiers from Der. Three substitute soldiers from Agade. Eight (soldiers) of Silll(ya), <son of> Idi, of (the town) Atusari. (Total:) eighteen . . . mandu-soldiers. (To be provisioned with) barley"

== Ancient name ==
It has been suggested that the name of the site was the Kassite town of Palum or the Ur III period town of Balue however the epigraphic evidence from the site does not support these proposals. Another proposal was that it was part of the independent kingdom of Namar (later Namri), known to be in that area and attested beginning in the Early Dynastic period. The theophoric elements are Mesopotamian (primarily Sin but also Istar, Amurrum, Samas, and Adad, Ea, Gula, Ishara, Lahma, Mama, Namar, Tispak, and Tutu) and the month names (Kinunu(m), Tamhlrum, and, Saharatu) match those used at Eshnunna and Tell Ishchali in the Diyâla region. Based on that, and an onomastic analysis, it has been proposed that in the Old Babylonian period Chogha Gavaneh was an outpost of Eshnunna, at that time a powerful polity in the Diyâla.

== History ==
Based on pottery shards, the site was occupied from the Neolithic period through the early 2nd millennium BC then, after a period when the site fell out of use, it was re-occupied in the Islamic period. Significant building construction dates to c. 1800 BC.

== See also ==
- Chronology of the ancient Near East
- Cities of the ancient Near East
- Tepe Sialk
- Tell Yelkhi
- Tepe Yahya
