= Takitu =

Hurrian and Ugaritic goddess

- Sukkal of Ḫepat
- Major cult center: Ugarit, Hattusa

Takitu, Takiti or Daqitu was a Hurrian goddess who served as the sukkal (attendant deity) of Ḫepat. She appears alongside her mistress in a number of Hurrian myths, in which she is portrayed as her closest confidante. Her name is usually assumed to have its origin in a Semitic language, though a possible Hurrian etymology has also been proposed. She was worshiped in Hattusa, Lawazantiya and Ugarit.

== Name ==
Multiple spellings of Takitu's name are attested in Hurrian and Hittite texts, alternating between ta and tu and da and du, which results in alternate forms such as Dakitu or Dakidu. In the Ugaritic alphabetic script it was spelled as dqt. Dennis Pardee vocalizes this form as Daqqītu, while Daniel Schwemer as Daqitu.

On the basis of the Ugaritic form of the name it has been proposed that it was derived from the Semitic root dqq, "small". It can accordingly be translated as "the small one". Meindert Dijkstra instead suggested that it might be connected with the Hurrian word taki, "beautiful".

== Character ==
Takitu fulfilled the role of Ḫepat's servant and divine vizier (sukkal). Volkert Haas characterizes her as Ḫepat's closest confidante in myths. Dennis Pardee argues that in Ugarit she belonged to the same group of deities as Pidray, a local goddess considered to be analogous to Ḫepat.

While in myths the role of Ḫepat's attendant belongs to Takitu, in some ritual texts it instead belongs to Tiyabenti, a deity whose gender is unclear according to Gary Beckman, but identified as a goddess by Marie-Claude Trémouille. According to Alfonso Archi, Tiyabenti's name has Hurrian origin and means "he who speaks favorably" or "she who speaks favorably". Takitu and Tiyabenti coexist in offering lists, where both can accompany Ḫepat, which according to Marie-Claude Trémouille indicates that theories according to which one of them was merely an epithet of the other are unsubstantiated.

An offering lists focused on the circle of Ḫepat refers to Takitu as Taki-Takitu, "the beautiful Takitu". According to Volkert Haas, she was imagined as a youthful deity.

== Worship ==
Takitu belonged to the circle of deities associated with Ḫepat, and appears in kaluti (offering lists) dedicated to her. In Yazılıkaya, she is depicted behind Ḫepat's children Šarruma, Allanzu and Kunzišalli, in front of Hutena and Hutellura. A Hurrian religions text mentions that during one ritual involving Kumarbi and the so-called "former gods", Takitu should sit next to Ḫepat, on her left side. Another, which identifies her as a gatekeeper (Hurrian: amummekunni) similarly prescribes seating her to the left of her mistress.

Locations where Takitu was worshiped include Hattusa, where a staff serving as a cultic utensil connected to her was held, Lawazantiya in Kizzuwatna, and Ugarit. In the last of these cities, she is attested in a number Hurrian offering lists, either in her standard place after Ḫepat, after Ninatta and Kulitta and before Nikkal, or in one case after Hutena and Hutellura as the last deity listed. She also appears in a number of texts written in the Ugaritic language in an alphabetic script. She is mentioned in the very first text discovered during the excavations in 1929, a ritual taking place over the course of two days, partially at night. She received an ewe as an offering during it, after the local goddess Pidray and before Tiraṯu, the god of wine. She is also mentioned in a deity list, which similarly places her after Pidray and before Tiraṯu.

== Mythology ==
A myth preserved on the tablet CTH 346.12 describes Takitu's journey through the lands of Mitanni to Šimurrum, undertaken on behalf of her mistress, Ḫepat.

Takitu also appears in the Song of Ullikummi, where Ḫepat tasks her with finding out the fate of her husband Teshub after his initial confrontation with the eponymous monster. Later Ḫepat's servants have to hold her to make sure she does not fall from the roof while Teshub's brother Tashmishu brings her information about his fate.
