= Ḫepat =

Hurrian goddess

- Tutelary goddess of Aleppo and wife of the weather god
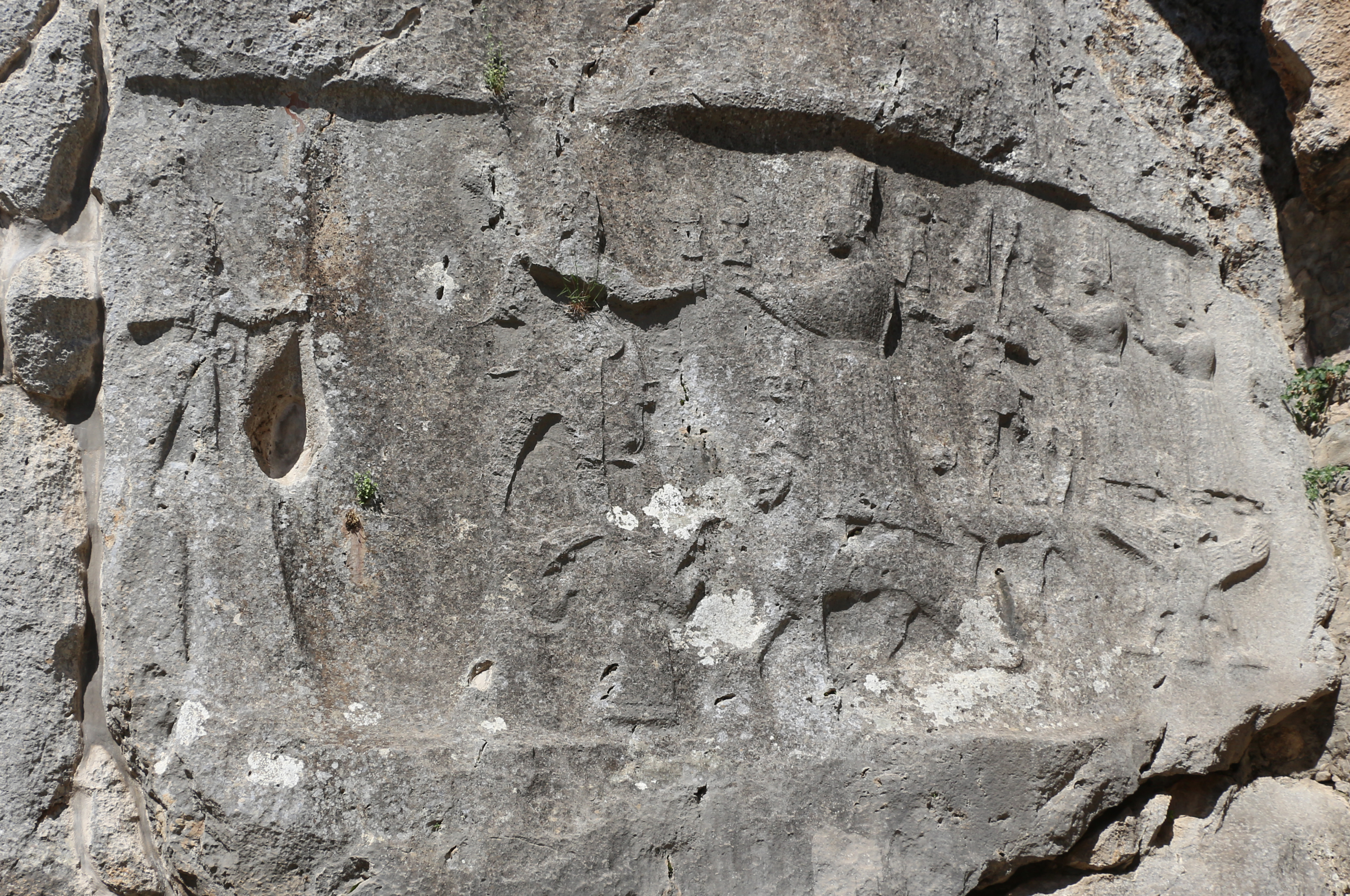
- Ḫepat (right), Teshub (left) and their family, as depicted on the Yazılıkaya reliefs.
- Other names: Ḫalabatu
- Major cult center: Aleppo, Kummanni

Genealogy
- Spouse: Adad (in the third millennium BCE); Teshub (in Hurrian religion); Tarḫunz (in late Luwian sources)
- Children: Šarruma, Allanzu and Kunzišalli

Equivalents
- Hittite: Sun goddess of Arinna
- Ugaritic: Pidray

Ḫepat (Hurrian: 𒀭𒄭𒁁, ^{d}ḫe-pát; also romanized as Ḫebat; Ugaritic 𐎃𐎁𐎚, ḫbt) was a goddess associated with Aleppo, originally worshiped in the north of modern Syria in the third millennium BCE. Her name is often presumed to be either a feminine nisba referring to her connection to this city, or alternatively a derivative of the root ḫbb, "to love". Her best attested role is that of the spouse of various weather gods. She was already associated with Adad in Ebla and Aleppo in the third millennium BCE, and in later times they are attested as a couple in cities such as Alalakh and Emar. In Hurrian religion she instead came to be linked with Teshub, which in the first millennium BCE led to the development of a tradition in which she was the spouse of his Luwian counterpart Tarḫunz. Associations between her and numerous other deities are described in Hurrian ritual texts, where she heads her own kaluti, a type of offering lists dedicated to the circle of a specific deity. She commonly appears in them alongside her children, Šarruma, Allanzu and Kunzišalli. Her divine attendant was the goddess Takitu. In Hittite sources, she could sometimes be recognized as the counterpart of the Sun goddess of Arinna, though their respective roles were distinct and most likely this theological conception only had limited recognition. In Ugarit the local goddess Pidray could be considered analogous to her instead.

The oldest evidence for the worship of Ḫepat comes from texts from Ebla, though she was not a major goddess in Eblaite religion. In later times she was worshiped in the kingdom of Yamhad, as well as in Emar. She was also incorporated into Hurrian religion, though most of the related evidence comes exclusively from western Hurrian polities such as Kizzuwatna, where her cult center was Kummanni. In Ugarit, as well as among the eastern Hurrian communities, her importance was comparably smaller. She was also incorporated into Hittite and Luwian religion through Hurrian mediation, and as a result continued to be worshiped in the first millennium BCE in states such as Tabal and Samʾal. The goddess Hipta, known from Lydia and from later Orphic sources, is sometimes presumed to be a late form of her. A less direct connection between her and another figure known from classical sources, Ma, has also been proposed.

== Name and character ==
The theonym Ḫepat was written in cuneiform as ^{d}ḫé-pát or ^{d}ḫé-pá-at, while in the Ugaritic alphabetic script as ḫbt. Romanizations with the middle consonant rendered as both p and b can both be found in modern literature, with the former being an attempt at representing unvoiced consonants present in the Hurrian language. The breve under the first consonant is sometimes omitted. A variant of the name without t is attested in primary sources. It occurs particularly commonly in theophoric names. Examples include the names of Mittani princesses Kelu-Ḫepa and Tadu-Ḫepa, Hittite queen Puduḫepa and Abdi-Heba ("servant of Ḫepat"), a ruler of Jerusalem known from the Amarna correspondence. In Egyptian texts, it could be rendered as ḫipa. In older publications this variant is sometimes romanized as Khipa.

According to Alfonso Archi, the theonym ^{d}ḫa-a-ba-du (/ḫalabāytu/) known from Eblaite texts can be considered an early form of Ḫepat's name and indicates it should be interpreted as a nisba, "she of Ḫalab (Aleppo)". He romanizes the Eblaite theonym as Ḫalabatu. He concludes that the later form of the name developed through the process of velarization, with the loss of the l resulting in a change from a to e, similarly to cases of loss of ḥ, ʿ or ġ well documented in various Akkadian words. An alternate proposal is to interpret it as Ḫibbat, "the beloved", from the root ḫbb, "to love". Lluís Feliu notes it is not impossible both options are correct, which would reflect a case of polysemy. Doubts about the validity of both etymological proposals have been expressed by Daniel Schwemer, though he also supports interpreting the Eblaite goddess as an early form of Ḫepat. The assumption that both names refer to the same goddess is also supported by other researchers, for example Gary Beckman and Piotr Taracha.

In early scholarship attempts have been made to show a linguistic connection between the theonym Ḫepat and the biblical given name Ḥawwat (Eve), but as stressed by Daniel E. Fleming they are phonologically dissimilar.

Various epithets could be employed to designate Ḫepat as a deity who held a high position in the pantheon, for example "queen", "lady of heaven" and "queen of heaven". The last of them occurs in Hittite treaties. She could also be linked to the institution of kingship. A Hurrian ceremony dedicated to her was concerned with the concept of allašši, "ladyship", in analogy to Teshub's ceremony of šarrašši, "kingship". Ḫepat also had maternal characteristics, and could be invoked in rituals connected with midwifery. While this aspect of her character is only directly documented in texts from Hattusa, Thomas Richter argues that it might have already been known in Syria in the Old Babylonian period, as she was invoked particularly commonly in Hurrian theophoric names attributing the birth of a child to the help of a specific deity, one example being Uru-Ḫepa, "Ḫepat let the girl exist".

== Associations with other deities ==
=== Ḫepat and weather gods ===
Ḫepat's best attested characteristic was her status as the spouse of various weather gods, especially those associated with Aleppo. It is possible that this connection went as far back as the twenty seventh century BCE. It is assumed that she and Hadda (Adad) of Aleppo were already viewed as a couple in the Eblaite texts. Outside of this area, this tradition was also followed in Alalakh. Evidence is also available from Emar, where she occurs alongside the local weather god in a festival focused on the NIN.DINGIR priestess. Daniel E. Fleming argues that he was also linked with Ashtart in local tradition, rather than exclusively with Ḫepat, though he accepts that the ritual texts only acknowledge the latter pair. Daniel Schwemer suggests that two pairings, one belonging to the tradition of Aleppo and the other reflecting coastal beliefs, coexisted in Emar. Further east in Mesopotamia the spouse of the weather god was usually Shala instead. Additionally, in Upper Mesopotamia in the Old Babylonian period local goddesses might have been recognized as his partners, for example Bēlet-Apim or Bēlet-Qaṭṭarā. Schwemer suggests that Ḫepat might have nonetheless been recognized as his spouse in the Mesopotamian kingdom of Mari, though he admits there is no evidence that she was worshiped in the local temple dedicated to him. Shala is attested in theophoric names from this city, though all of them are Akkadian and belonged to people hailing from neighboring Babylonia.

In Hurrian tradition Ḫepat's spouse was Teshub. The earliest evidence for this pairing has been identified in Old Babylonian sources from Mari. However, according to Lluís Feliu it is not impossible that among eastern Hurrian communities Shala was regarded as Teshub's wife instead, which might explain her appearance among Hurrian deities in the treaty between Šuppiluliuma I and Šattiwaza. In Ugarit, Ḫepat was recognized only as the spouse of Teshub, venerated there as the god of Aleppo, while the local weather god, Baal, (Note: In coastal areas from the fifteenth century onward Hadad came to be replaced as the primary name of the weather god with the epithet Baal, treated as if it was a proper name.) was most likely considered to be unmarried.

In Tabal in the eighth century BCE Ḫepat was paired with the Luwian weather god Tarḫunz, which reflected the development of a new tradition presumably dependent on considering him analogous to Teshub. She also retained her role as the spouse of the weather god in Carchemish in the first millennium BCE, and in inscriptions from this city Tarḫunz appears alongside "Ḫipatu".

=== Kaluti of Ḫepat ===
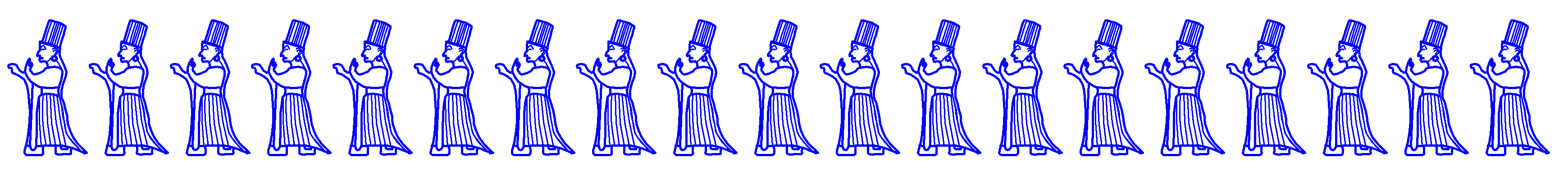
An illustration showing the procession of goddesses following Ḫepat in Yazılıkaya.

In Hurrian sources various deities were included in the kaluti, or offering lists, dedicated to Ḫepat, and as such formed a part of her circle: her son Šarruma, her two daughters Allanzu and Kunzišalli, Takitu, Hutena and Hutellura, Allani, Ishara, Shalash, Damkina, (Umbu-)Nikkal, Ayu-Ikalti, Šauška (alongside her servants Ninatta and Kulitta), Nabarbi, Shuwala, Adamma, Kubaba, Hašuntarḫi, Uršui-Iškalli, Tiyabenti, as well as "ancestors of Ḫepat" (Note: So-called enna(-ša) attani-we-na(-ša)'; similar ancestral deities are also attested for Teshub, Šauška, Lelluri, Šimige and Nikkal and were based on similar Mesopotamian deities such as ancestors of Enlil.) and various cultic paraphernalia connected with her. A similar group of deities follows Ḫepat and her family on the reliefs from the Yazılıkaya sanctuary: Takitu, Hutena and Hutellura, Allani, Ishara, Nabarbi, Shalash, Damkina, Nikkal, Aya, Šauška and Shuwala are identified by name in accompanying inscriptions, while six other goddesses are left unnamed.

Ḫepat could also form a dyad alongside one of her children, usually Šarruma, though attestations of Allanzu and Kunzišalli in this context are known too. Another deity who in ritual texts could form a dyad with her was Mušuni, "she of justice." Piotr Tarcha assumes that she can be considered a personified attribute or epithet of Ḫepat. However, it has been proposed that she was a separate goddess associated with the underworld, and in one case she appears in a ritual alongside Allani and Ishara. Another dyad consisted of Ḫepat and the otherwise unknown deity Ḫašulatḫi.

Two deities are attested in the role of Ḫepat's sukkal (divine attendant), Takitu and Tiyabenti. While only Takitu appears in myths, she and Tiyabenti coexist in ritual texts, where both can accompany their mistress, which according to Marie-Claude Trémouille indicates that the view that one of them was merely an epithet of the other is unsubstantiated.

=== Sun goddess of Arinna and Ḫepat ===
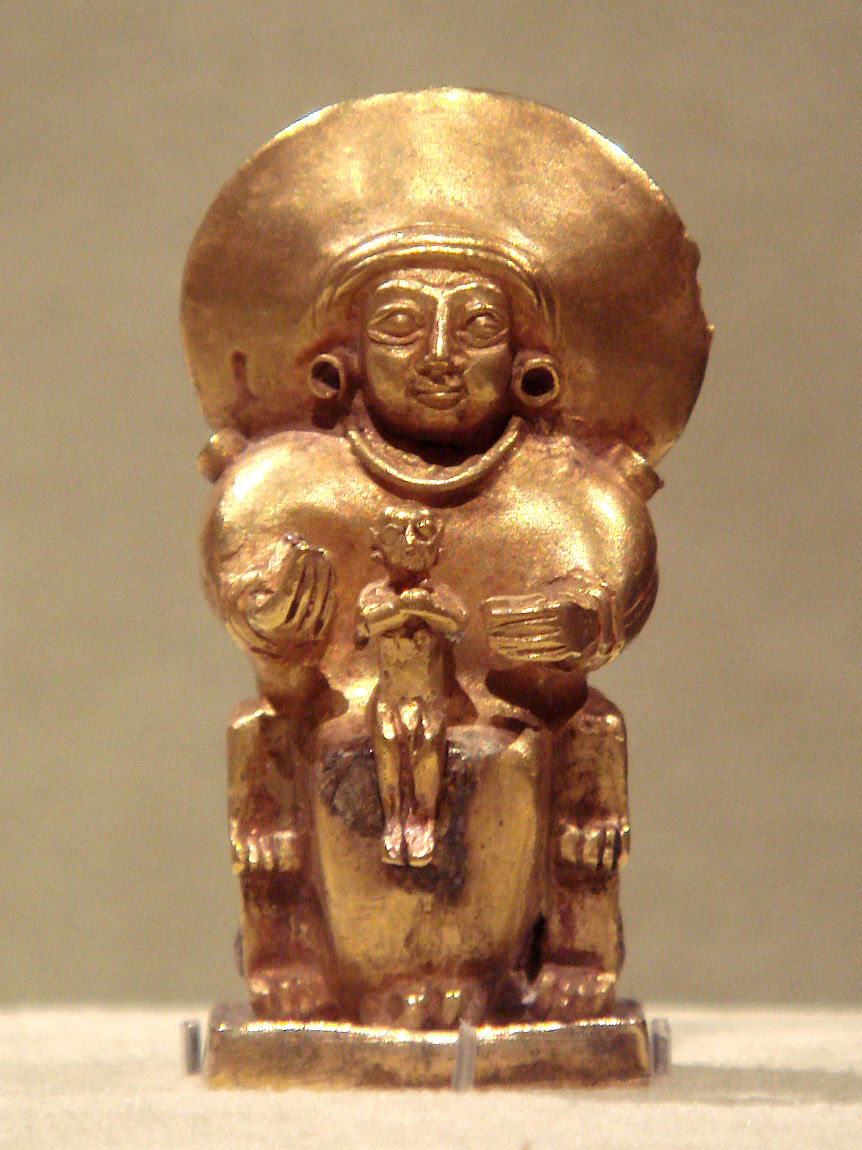
Possible depiction of the Sun goddess of Arinna.

In an effort to harmonize the dynastic pantheon of the Hittite kings, which was influenced by Hurrian religion, with the state pantheon consisting of Hattic and Hittite deities, attempts were made to syncretise Ḫepat and the Sun goddess of Arinna. The best known source attesting it is a prayer of queen Puduḫepa, the wife of Ḫattušili III:

O Sun-goddess of Arinna, my lady, queen of all the lands! In Hatti you gave yourself the name Sun-goddess of Arinna, but the land which you made that of the cedar, there you gave yourself the name Ḫebat.

However, Piotr Taracha considers it impossible that this idea was adopted into everyday religious practices of the general Hittite population. Gary Beckman refers to it as a "rare and exceptional" example. Daniel Schwemer notes that the character of the goddess of Arinna was dissimilar to that of Ḫepat, and that unlike the latter she had a well established individual role in the pantheon. Furthermore, Ḫepat never replaced her in her traditional position in treaties and similar documents.

=== Other associations ===
In Aleppo during the existence of the kingdom of Yamhad Ḫepat seemingly belonged to the circle of deities associated with Dagan, presumably due to her connection to his son, Adad. Lluís Feliu suggests that she might have been viewed as the daughter of the former and his wife Shalash.

A list of deities from Ugarit identifies Pidray as the local counterpart of Ḫepat. Wilfred H. van Soldt suggested that in theophoric names from this city the theonym Ḫepat might have been used as a stand-in for Pidray. According to Daniel Schwemer, it is unlikely that this equation reflected a tradition in which Pidray was the wife of the local weather god, Baal.

== Worship ==
=== Ebla and nearby areas ===
The worship of Ḫepat had its roots in the north of modern Syria. Eblaite texts indicate that under the early form of her name, Ḫalabāytu, she was worshiped in Ebla and in Aleppo in the third millennium BCE. She is first attested during the reigns of Eblaite kings Irkab-Damu and Išar-Damu and their viziers Ibrium and Ibbi-Zikir. However, she was not a goddess of major importance in Eblaite religion. She always appears in association with Aleppo in Eblaite sources, though she is very sparsely attested in this text corpus. She received offerings of various golden and silver objects, as well as cattle. In the offering list TM.76.G.22 she is the seventh deity mentioned, after Adad, Adad of Aleppo, Dagan of Tuttul, Hadabal of Arugadu, the Eblaite sun deity, Resheph of Aidu (a sparsely attested minor settlement) and Ishtar of Šetil (another small, poorly known settlement). Another text, written during the sixth year of Ibbi-Zikir and focused on offerings to the weather god of Aleppo, mentions that the king of Ebla offered a buckle to her.

A single theophoric name invoking Ḫepat is known from Ebla from the second millennium BCE. A local ruler, one of the possible members of a dynasty which ruled in the city in the twentieth century BCE, was named Igriš-Ḫeba (ig-ri-iš-ḪI-IB, with the last two signs read as ḫe-eba_{x}). She is also depicted on a seal which might have belonged to a son of another local ruler, Indi-Limma.

=== Yamhad and Mari ===
It is presumed that Ḫepat continued to be worshiped in Aleppo through the Old Babylonian period. In one of the texts from Mari from the same period, a letter to Zimri-Lim, she is mentioned alongside Dagan and Shalash in an account of the pagrā’um, a mourning ceremony combined with the offering of sacrificial animals to deities, which in this case was held in honor of king Sumu-Epuh of Yamhad by his successor Hammurapi in the royal palace in Aleppo. In another letter an anonymous woman mentions she will pray for Zimri-Lim to her and a weather god (^{d}IŠKUR), possibly Teshub. No theophoric names invoking Ḫepat occur in sources from Mari, with examples cited in older literature being now considered misreadings or otherwise dubious. Five examples are however attested in texts from Alalakh documenting the period when the city was under the control of the kingdom of Yamhad: Ḫebat-allani, Ḫebat-DINGIR (reading of the second element is uncertain), Ḫebat-muhirni, Ḫebat-ubarra and Ummu-Ḫebat. She is also one of the three deities, the other two being Adad and the city goddess of Alalakh, here designated by the logogram ^{d}IŠTAR (in the past erroneously interpreted as an epithet of Ḫepat), who are invoked in the curse formula in a text detailing how Abba-El I's brother Yarim-Lim became the ruler of this city after the destruction of Irride.

=== Emar ===
The worship of Ḫepat is also documented in texts from Emar. Herbert Niehr suggests that the double temple discovered during excavations was dedicated jointly to her and the local weather god. However, as stressed by Daniel E. Fleming in textual sources she occurs in "a fairly narrow setting" compared to deities such as ^{d}NIN.KUR. She was commonly associated with sikkānu stones, often interpreted by researchers as aniconic representations of deities, though this view is not universally accepted. The use of such objects is documented in texts from Ugarit, Mari and Ebla as well, and it is presumed it was a distinct feature of religious practice in ancient Syria from the third millennium BCE to the end of the Bronze Age. The anointing of a sikkānu dedicated to her is mentioned in instruction for the initiation of a NIN.DINGIR priestess of the local weather god, and offerings to it were made during the zukru festival. It was apparently located inside the city. Furthermore, an inventory of metal objects belonging to Ḫepat has been identified among texts discovered in Emar. Theophoric names invoking her are attested in sources from this city too. Examples include Asmu-Ḫebat and Ḫebat-ilī.

=== Western Hurrian sources ===
As argued by Daniel E. Fleming, Ḫepat's role in Hurrian religion is best known today. According to Alfonso Archi, after the fall of Ebla she and a number of other deities belonging to the pantheon of the city, such as Adamma, Ammarik, Aštabi and Šanugaru, did not retain their former position in the religion of the Amorites, who became the dominant culture in Syria, and as a result were reduced to figures of at best local significance, eventually incorporated into the religion of the Hurrians when they arrived in the same area a few centuries later. She is particularly well attested in sources originating in western Hurrian communities. She was the highest ranked Hurrian goddess in the traditions of Aleppo and the kingdom of Kizzuwatna, where she was worshiped in Kummanni and Lawazantiya. However, she only acquired this position by displacing Šauška from her position attested in sources from most Hurrian centers in the east, such as Nuzi. In addition to Ḫepat herself, her various cultic paraphernalia could be venerated too, for example her throne.

==== Ugaritic sources ====
Ḫepat was among the Hurrian deities worshiped in Ugarit. She appears exclusively in texts belonging to the Hurrian milieu in this city. However, her position in the local variant of the Hurrian pantheon was relatively low, and it is presumed that Šauška retained the role of the foremost goddess.

In the text RS 24.261, a ritual combining Hurrian and Ugaritic elements and focused on the local goddess Ashtart and her Hurrian counterpart Šauška, Ḫepat is listed between Pišaišapḫi and Daqitu in a sequence of deities who were recipients of offerings during it. RS 24.291, a bilingual text dealing with another ritual, which was focused on the bed of Pidray, prescribes offering a single ram to Ḫepat during the first day of the celebrations, and two of the same animal and then separately a cow on the second.

Fifteen theophoric names invoking Ḫepat have been identified in the corpus of Ugaritic texts, though one of them belonged to a person from outside the city. A letter sent by king Šauška-muwa of Amurru indicates that a temple of Ḫepat existed in the proximity of Ugarit in the settlement ‘Ari.

=== Eastern Hurrian sources ===
While Ḫepat was not regarded as one of the major deities in the eastern Hurrian polities, she was not entirely unknown there. It has been proposed that she was perceived as a deity of high status by the royal family of the Mitanni Empire, where she is attested in theophoric names of princesses. The attested examples are Kelu-Ḫepa and Tatu-Ḫepa, both from the fourteenth century BCE. In Nuzi names invoking her are uncommon. Two examples are known, Šuwar-Ḫepa and Šatu-Ḫepa; both of these individuals were relatives of a local prince.

While western Hurrian literary texts describe Ḫepat as a deity worshiped in Kumme, likely located east of the Khabur, it is not certain if she was venerated in this location.

=== Hittite reception ===
Ḫepat also came to be incorporated into Hittite religion. She is mentioned for the first time in Hittite sources in an account of Ḫattušili I's expedition against Ḫaššum, during which he seized the statues of deities worshiped in this Hurrian polity, among them this goddess, as well as Lelluri, Allatum, Adalur and the god of Aleppo. The statue was then deposited in a temple of Mezulla. In later times she and Teshub were the two main deities in the dynastic pantheon which according to Piotr Taracha first developed when a new dynasty originating in Kizzuwatna came to reign over the Hittite Empire. In the Šunaššura treaty, Ḫepat and Teshub, described as the deities of Aleppo, appear directly after the three main deities of the Hittite state pantheon, the weather god (Tarḫunna), the sun goddess of Arinna, and a "tutelary deity of Hatti" (designated by the sumerogram ^{d}LAMMA, to be read as Inara or Inar). However, this placement of the pair is unique. Typically Ḫepat was not listed among the most major deities in treaties. She is also attested in the Egyptian version of the treaty between the Hittite Empire and Egypt, presumably originally compiled when peace was established in 1259 BCE (twenty first year of Ramesses II's reign), following earlier hostilities which led to the battle of Kadesh. However, the Egyptian scribe apparently misunderstood Ḫepat as the name of a male deity, treating the determinative DINGIR as analogous to masculine Egyptian pꜢ-nṯr, even though she is designated in this text by the feminine title "queen of heaven" (tꜢ-ḥmt-nswt n tꜢ-pt; translation of cuneiform SAL.LUGAL.AN). (Note: The scribe similarly incorrectly interpreted Ninatta and Kulitta as male deities, despite correctly determining the gender of most other deities invoked.)

In the Hittite Empire Ḫepat was worshiped in Hattusa. She is depicted standing on the back of a leopard and accompanied by her children (Šarruma, Allanzu and Kunzišalli) on the central relief of the nearby Yazılıkaya sanctuary, which was dedicated to the worship of deities of Hurrian origin. The procession of goddesses who follow them reflects the order of the kaluti (offering lists). Alongside Teshub Ḫepat formed the main pair in the local pantheon of Šapinuwa, where Hurrian deities were introduced in the beginning of the reign of Tudhaliya III, when the king temporarily resided there during a period of political turmoil. During the reign of Muwatalli II she was venerated in Šamuḫa, though it is possible she, Teshub and Šauška were already introduced to the local pantheon during the reign of Tudhaliya III, when he had to relocate the capital to this city after the Kaška burned down Hattusa. Muršili II introduced the worship of Ḫepat to Katapa, where he resided near the end of his reign. During the reign of Tudḫaliya IV, she was worshiped alongside other deities associated with Teshub during a section of the AN.TAḪ.ŠUM taking place in the local temple of Kataḫḫa. There is also some evidence that the worship of Ḫepat spread to cities located in the north of the Hittite sphere of influence, including Ḫurma and Uda.

=== Luwian reception ===
Ḫepat was also worshiped by the Luwians, initially as a result of Teshub displacing the native storm god Tarḫunz in the pantheons of their easternmost communities. She appears in Luwian ritual texts originating in Kizzuwatna, where Hurrian and Luwian traditions coexisted. However, as noted by Manfred Hutter, she did not yet belong to the core Luwian pantheon and only in the first millennium BCE she became a "Luwianized" deity. She was worshiped alongside Tarḫunz in the Neo-Hittite kingdom of Tabal, which reflected the development of a new partially Hurrianized Luwian local pantheon. She might also be depicted on an orthostat from Sam’al. Herbert Niehr argues that her presence in this kingdom might indicate that despite lack of attestations she was still worshiped in Aleppo in the first millennium BCE.

=== Possible later attestations ===
==== Hipta and Mystis ====
It is possible that Hipta (Ἵπτα), a goddess regarded as the consort of Sabazios and attested in four Greek inscriptions from Katakekaumene, a region located in historical Lydia, was a late form of Ḫepat. Later on Hipta was incorporated into the Orphic tradition. Proclus maintained that one of Orpheus' works was focused on her. He describes her as responsible for receiving the newborn Dionysus, and states that she carried a ritual winnowing basket (liknon) and a snake. Her actions and the aforementioned god's birth from the thigh of Zeus are reinterpreted by this author as "the reception of the intelligible forms by the world soul, participating in the 'mundane intellect' of the world, that is to say Dionysus". Orphic Hymn number 49, possibly composed between the second and third centuries CE, is dedicated to Hipta and similarly describes her as the nurse of Dionysus:

I call upon Hipta, nurse of Bacchos, maiden possessed,
in mystic rites she takes part, she exults in the worship of pure Sabos,
and in the night dances of roaring Iacchos.
O queen and chthonic mother, hear my prayer (...).

Rosa García-Gasco additionally argues that Mystis from Nonnus' Dionysiaca can be considered analogous to Hipta, and that while he did not invent this name, he was the first to apply it to a preexisting Orphic figure. She suggests that the change was meant to further highlight her allegorical status and to facilitate word play. Laura Miguélez instead concludes Mystis was based on artistic portrayals of Dionysus in the company of nurses, and on vague knowledge that women fulfilling such roles played a role in some of the cults dedicated to this god.

==== Other proposed examples ====
René Lebrun has proposed that an indirect connection might have existed between Ḫepat and Ma, a deity worshiped in classical Comana, commonly assumed to correspond to Bronze Age Kummanni. He argues that possibly the site was initially associated with Hittite Mamma (Ammamma), who later came to be conflated by Ḫepat, acquiring an indirect connection with the Sun goddess of Arinna by extension, which in turn after Hurrian theonyms ceased to be used in the region might have led to the emergence of Ma, whose name might be a haplologic variant of Mamma and who as sometimes argued might have had solar traits. However, he ultimately considers Ḫepat and the possible forerunner of Ma to be two originally separate figures.

The proposal that the Lycian deity pddẽxba was a local form of Ḫepat is implausible according to Rostislav Oreshko, as most of the attested Lycian deities find no direct correspondence with other figures worshiped in ancient Anatolia, and the second element of the name is more likely to be related to the word -xba-, "river", instead.

== Mythology ==
In Hurrian myths belonging to the so-called Kumarbi Cycle, which deal with the struggle over kingship among the gods between the eponymous figure and his son Teshub, Ḫepat appears as one of the allies of the latter. She is mentioned in passing in the Song of Ḫedammu when Ea warns Teshub that if the conflict between him and Kumarbi continues, the gods' human followers might be harmed, which would lead to him, Ḫepat and Šauška having to work to provide themselves with food. She also appears in the Song of Ullikummi, in which the eponymous monster blocks the entrance of her temple, making her unable to communicate with other gods, which prompts her to task her servant Takitu with finding out the fate of her husband Teshub after his initial confrontation with Ullikummi. The fragment describing her journey and return are poorly preserved. Later Teshub's brother Tašmišu manages to bring a message from him to Ḫepat, which almost makes her fall from the roof of her temple, though her servants manage to stop her. Her isolation is also mentioned by Ea when he asks the giant Upelluri if he is aware of the impact of Ullikummi on the world.

In the myth CTH 346.12 Ḫepat instructs Takitu to travel through the lands of Mitanni to Šimurrum on her behalf.
