= Uršui =

Hurrian goddess

- Major cult center: possibly Uršu

Uršui or Uršue was a Hurrian goddess. Her name might be derived from the toponym Uršu. It is not certain if the related theonym Uršui-Iškalli should be interpreted as Uršui's name being used as an epithet, as her name accompanied by epithet, or as a pair of goddesses. In Hurrian offering lists (kaluti), Uršui appears as a member of the circle of either Ḫepat or Šauška.

== Name and character ==
Uršui's name was written in cuneiform as ^{d}Ur/Úr-šu-u/ú-i/e or ^{d}U-ur-šu-u/ú-i/e. Emmanuel Laroche suggested in 1946 that it can be interpreted as a combination of the Hurrian elements ur-, "to be available", and šui, "all", but this proposal is no longer regarded as plausible. More recently, Alfonso Archi suggested derivation from the toponym Uršu. This proposal is also considered likely by Mauro Giorgieri. A city named Uršu or Uršum is first attested in texts from Ebla and in an inscription of Gudea, and most likely was located in the proximity of modern Gaziantep, with proposed locations including Samsat, Tell Touqan and Kazane Hüyük, the first of which is considered most plausible. While the city continues to appear in Old Babylonian sources through the duration of the Mari archive, in Hittite archives it is only attested in sources from seventeenth and sixteenth century BCE, and later no longer appears in any cuneiform texts.

=== Uršui-Iškalli ===
In Hurro-Hittite texts Uršui's name was commonly paired with a second presumed theonym, Iškalli. Attestations of Iškalli without Uršui are very rare. They have been described as an example of a dyad, though it has also been suggested that Iškalli was an epithet of Uršui or the other way around. Alfonso Archi suggests that Iškalli is derived from the Akkadian word ešgallu, literally "great temple" but metaphorically also "underworld", and speculatively translates Uršui-Iškalli as "the great temple (of the nether world deities) of the city of Uršu", though he notes this meaning was presumably eventually forgotten in Hurrian tradition.

The text CTH 492 refers to Iškalli as a "witness" (^{d}Iškalli kutruaš), additionally the term āmmana, which precedes her name in a text pertaining to the ḫišuwa festival, KBo 17.9, might be her epithet. In a single case a mountain named Iškalli is also attested in Hurrian context.

== Worship ==
Many attestations of Uršui have been identified in Hurro-Hittite texts. She belonged to the court of Ḫepat. Both Uršui alone and the double theonym Uršui-Iškalli appear among deities associated with her in kaluti, Hurrian offering lists. However, there are also examples of Uršui appearing in the entourage of Šauška alongside deities such as Ninatta and Kulitta. The text CTH 714, which describes a ritual bath of a statue of Šauška, mentions Uršui in an enumeration of deities who receive an offering of unleavened bread, after Tarru, Takitu, Ea, Damkina, Aya, Šimige, the "paternal deities of Šauška and of the ritual patron", Allani, Išḫara, Umbu and Nikkal.

One of the tablets describing the ḫišuwa festival mentions Uršui. This celebration, which was focused on guaranteeing the prosperity of the royal family, originated in Kizzuwatna, involved deities from the local Hurrian pantheon (such as Išḫara, Allani, Nupatik, Maliya, Lelluri and Manuzi) and was introduced to Hattusa by queen Puduḫepa.
