= Šarruma =

Hittite and Hurrian deity

- Mountain god, protector deity
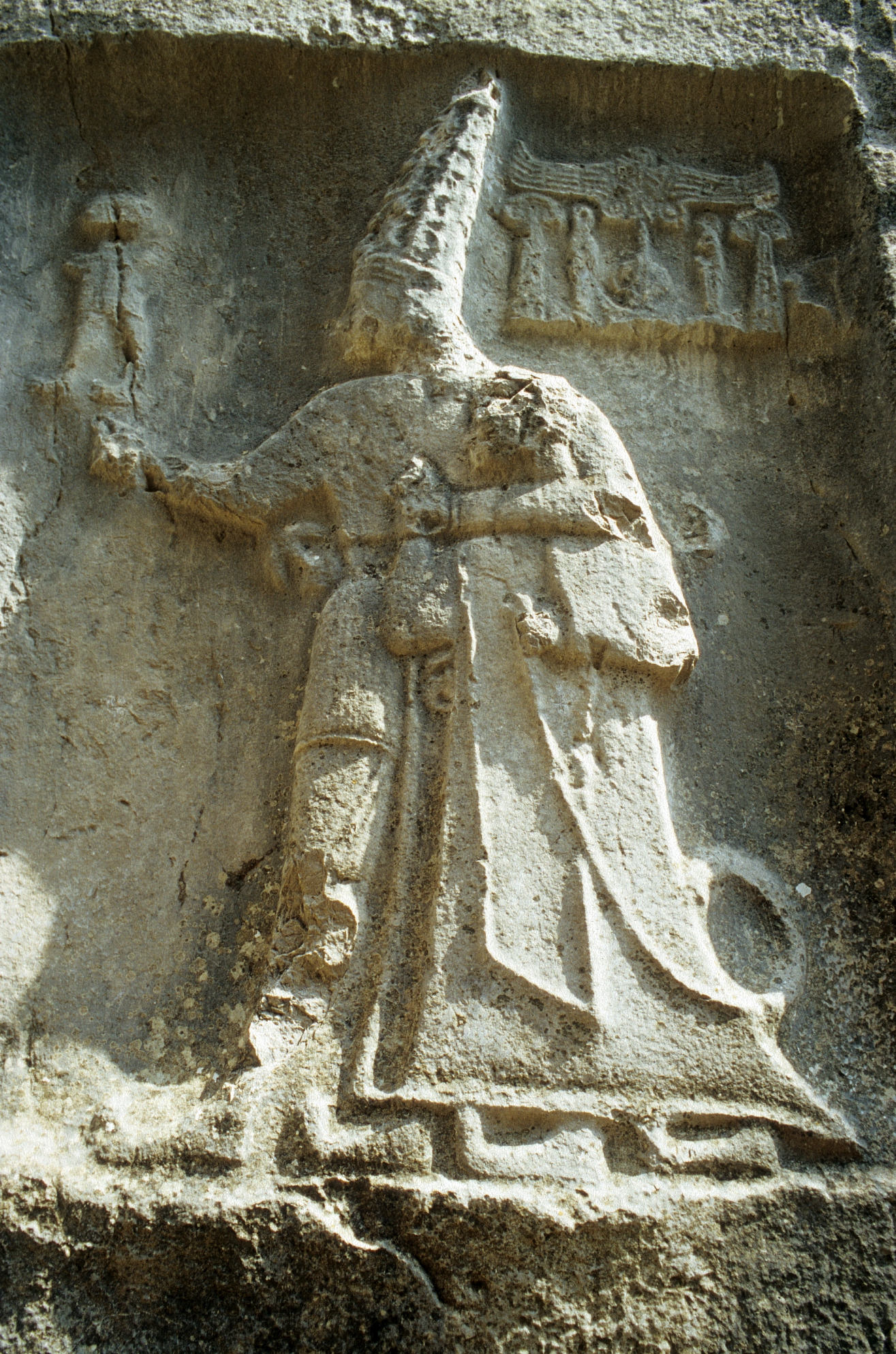
- A relief from chamber B of the Yazılıkaya sanctuary, depicting Šarruma and the Hittite king Tudḫaliya IV.
- Major cult center: Kummanni, Lawazantiya
- Weapon: lance
- Animals: bull, leopard
- Ethnic group: Hurrians, Hittites, Luwians

Genealogy
- Parents: Teshub (father); Ḫepat (mother)
- Siblings: Allanzu, Kunzišalli

Šarruma, also romanized as Šarrumma or Sharruma, was a Hurrian god. He could be depicted in both anthropomorphic form, sometimes riding on the back of a leopard, and in the theriomorphic form as a bull. His character is not fully understood, though it is known that he could function as a mountain god. He was regarded as a son of Ḫepat and Teshub. He was also linked to various moon deities. Additionally, the only mythological text he appears in addresses him as a messenger (sukkalu) of Kumarbi. He was worshiped by Hurrians in southeastern Anatolia and northern Syria, for example in Kummanni and Lawazantiya in Kizzuwatna. From this kingdom he was introduced to the Hittite pantheon as well. Hittite influence in turn resulted in his introduction to cities such as Aleppo, Emar and Ugarit. He was also venerated in Luwian religion in the first millennium BCE, with theophoric names invoking him attested from as late as the Hellenistic period in Cilicia and Lycia.

== Name ==
Multiple writings of the theonym Šarruma are attested in cuneiform texts, for example šar-ru-ma, šar-ru-um-ma, šar-ma and partially logographic LUGAL-ma and LUGAL-um-ma, which depended on the well attested use of the sumerogram LUGAL to render the phonetically similar Akkadian word šarru, "king". In the Ugaritic alphabetic script, it was written ṯrmn. This form of the name is vocalized as Ṯarrumannu by Dennis Pardee. In hieroglyphic Luwian it could be rendered as 80+má, 80+mi, 81+r-ma or sa_{5}+r+ru-ma, with 80 and 81 being modern designations for two Luwian signs resembling the lower half of the human body. Both of them effectively functioned as logographic representations of the name Šarruma, and they are sometimes transcribed as, respectively, SARRUMA and SARMA, with the proposed shortening of the name in Luwian context designating the simpler sign. However, as noted by Ignasi-Xavier Adiego it is disputed if clear evidence for the use of the contracted form Sarma exists, as when spelled phonetically in Luwian sources, the name is never contracted. Since in theophoric names logograms were typically used, the only possible attestation of Sarma is an ambiguous toponym, Urhisarma, which might instead contain the unrelated theonym Arma, and the names of Luwian rulers in Neo-Assyrian sources, Sandasarme and Wassurme, which might only represent a parallel to other cases of Assyrian modification of Anatolian personal names and place names, for example Sapalulme for Suppiluliuma or Urbillu for Warpalawa.

The etymology of Šarruma's name remains uncertain, with no conclusively proven proposals postulated yet. Daniel Schwemer refers to it as an "Anatolian" name, but acknowledges that its meaning cannot be established yet. Dennis Pardee and Gary Beckman classify it as Hurrian.

=== Plural forms ===
In addition to the basic theonym Šarruma, a diminutive plural form, Šarrumanni, is known from a prayer of Puduḫepa, which indicates it referred to a dyad of minor gods believed to intercede with Šarruma on behalf of petitioners. According to Piotr Taracha this can be considered an example of a phenomenon typical for the bronze age folk beliefs of southern Anatolia and northern Syria, with analogous derivatives also attested for Allanzu, Maliya, Ninatta and Kulitta.

A plural variant of the local form of the name, Ṯarrumannūma, is attested in the Ugaritic texts too. RS 1.001, the first text discovered during excavations in Ugarit, a set of instructions for a ritual taking place over the course of a single day and night, mentions that these deities were present in the royal palace alongside Shapash through the described night.

== Character and iconography ==
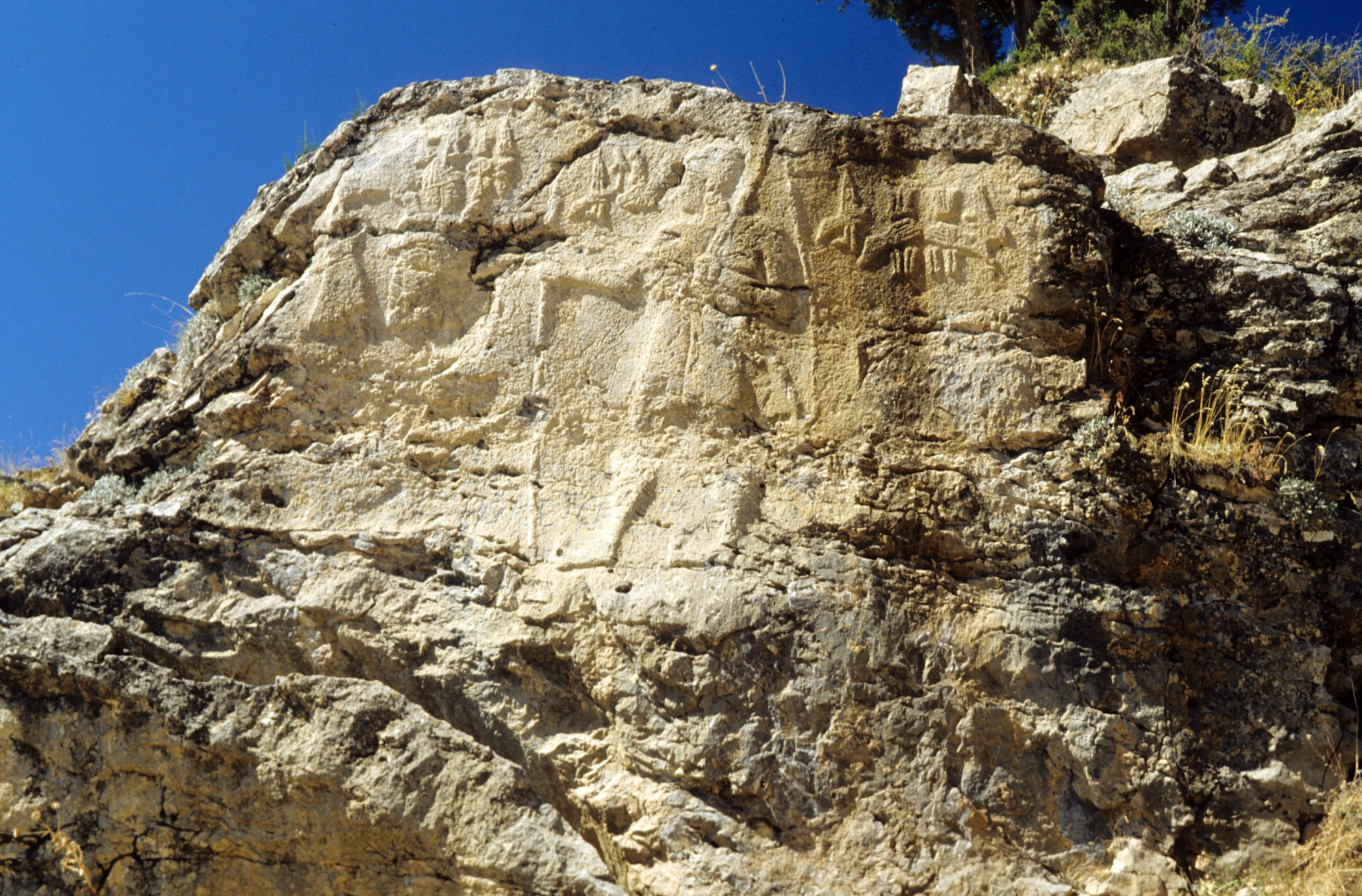
The Hanyeri relief, with Šarruma depicted in the form of a bull.

Most commonly Šarruma was depicted in art as an anthropomorphic deity, though he is portrayed in the form of a bull on the Hanyeri relief. Taracha argues that the latter type of depictions represents his oldest iconography. In the Yazılıkaya sanctuary and on a relief from Malatya he is portrayed standing on the back of a leopard. His weapon was a golden lance, as stated in the text KBo 21.34 + IBoT 1.7.

Šarruma was seemingly a multifaceted deity and his character is not fully understood. He is well attested as a protective deity. He could also take the role of an intercessor between worshipers and Teshub and Ḫepat. Modern authors additionally often describe him as a mountain god. Piotr Taracha argues it might have been his oldest characteristic. He could be referred to as the "king of the mountains", as indicated by an inscription from Hanyeri which labels him as MONS.REX in hieroglyphic Luwian. He might already be addressed as a mountain deity in an earlier prayer of Puduḫepa. Marie-Claude Trémouille has suggested that the names of a mountain located near the entrance of the realm of Mot in the Ugaritic Baal Cycle (KTU 1.4 VIII 1-20), which she vocalizes as Ṯarrummagi, might also be derived from Šarruma's name, which could be further evidence for his perception as a deity associated with mountains. However, this proposal is not universally accepted, and while it is agreed that the name does not originate in any Semitic language and might be Hurrian, Mark S. Smith and Wayne Pitard note linking it with Šarruma does not account for the fact that this toponym, which is rendered in the Ugaritic alphabetic script as ṯrmg, has a g as the final consonant. Ultimately its origin remains unknown.

== Associations with other deities ==
The goddess Ḫepat was considered Šarruma's mother. In offering lists he most commonly appears directly after her, and they could be worshiped together as a dyad. The latter phenomenon reflects a broader pattern of worship of dyads of deities in Hurrian religion, with other well attested examples including Allani and Ishara, Hutena and Hutellura, Ninatta and Kulitta or Umbu and Nikkal. Volkert Haas argued that that Šarruma was originally the partner (paredros) of Ḫepat. However, as noted by Marie-Claude Trémouille and Daniel Schwemer, no evidence in favor of this interpretation can be found in primary sources, and it is safe to assume the connection between them was only ever considered to be that between parent and child.

Šarruma's father was Teshub. As attested in Hurro-Hittite sources, he could be referred to as the "calf" (ḫubidi, AMAR-ti) of this god. It is possible that this title reflected the theriomorphic form of Šarruma. Schwemer notes it is one of the examples of a broader trend of associating bull gods with Teshub, also attested for Tilla, Šeri and Ḫurri. Gernot Wilhelm argues that the father-son relationship between Teshub and Šarruma constituted a late development. Schwemer dates it to the fifteenth century BCE, and presumes it originated in Kizzuwatna. Piotr Taracha notes that the connection between these two gods could be referenced in sources focusing on relations between members of the Hittite royal family, for example Urhi-Teshub while holding the position of the presumptive heir (tuḫkanti) of his father used a seal depicting him with Šarruma. It has also been noted a single Hittite ritual (KUB XXXIX 97) names Teshub's counterpart Tarḫunna as Šarruma's father instead.

Two goddesses, Allanzu and Kunzišalli, were regarded of children of Teshub and Ḫepat like Šarruma and in some cases were listed after him in enumerations of deities. In sources dated to Neo-Hittite times, such as inscriptions 1 and 9 from Ancoz, he and Allanzu formed a couple instead.

Šarruma could also be associated with lunar deities, including Hurrian Kušuḫ (or Umbu), as attested in Hurro-Hittite sources, and Luwian Arma, as indicated by a dedication from Ordekburnu. In Hittite military oaths, he could be invoked after a lunar deity and Ishara. A reference to "Šarruma of Harran" in an inscription from Kululu is also considered to hint at a connection to lunar deities. This city was well known for its connection to moon worship.

A single Hurrian texts from Ugarit (RS 1.007 = KTU 1.44) refers to Šarruma as the messenger (sukkalu) of Kumarbi. This constitutes the only reference to him in mythological context.

== Worship ==
Šarruma was worshiped as a local deity by Hurrians inhabiting northern Syria and southeastern Anatolia. He appears in offering lists (kaluti) of both Ḫepat and Teshub. In the kingdom of Kizzuwatna, his cult centers were Kummanni and Lawazantiya. Marie-Claude Trémouille argues that he most likely originated in this area.

Numerous Hurrian theophoric names invoking Šarruma are known from text corpora from Anatolia, typically with his name as the second element, for example Ari-Šarruma ("Šarruma has given"), Eḫli-Šarruma ("Šarruma, save!"), Ewri-Šarruma ("Šarruma is lord"), Ḫišmi-Šarruma ("Šarruma is shining") or Talmi-Šarruma ("Šarruma is great").

=== Hittite reception ===
Hittite texts indicate that Šarruma was at some point introduced to the Hittite pantheon, presumably from the Hurrian traditions of Kizzuwatna. He was worshiped in Hattusa, Šapinuwa, Uda, Urikina and Laiuna.

Šuppiluliuma I appointed his son Telipinu as the high priest of Šarruma and stationed him in Aleppo. In the same city his successor Talmi-Šarruma built a temple dedicated to the dyad Ḫepat-Šarruma (^{DEUS}ḫa-pa-SARMA), though this god is otherwise unattested in sources from it. Piotr Taracha notes he was not a deity indigenous to the local pantheon, and Marie-Claude Trémouille attributes his introduction to the local pantheon to Hittite influence. Daniel Schwemer suggests that this might have occurred during the life of Telipinu, who served as a priest in Kizzuwatna at first and might have introduced local theological conceptions to Aleppo after relocating there. Alfonso Archi points out that the inscription might be the oldest example of a hieroglyphic Luwian text chiseled in stone, and suggests its target audience were primarily Luwians, even though Aleppo's elite was culturally hurrianized and the local inhabitants spoke a vernacular West Semitic dialect. Attestations of Šarruma from Emar are also presumed to reflect Hittite influence. They are limited to personal names.

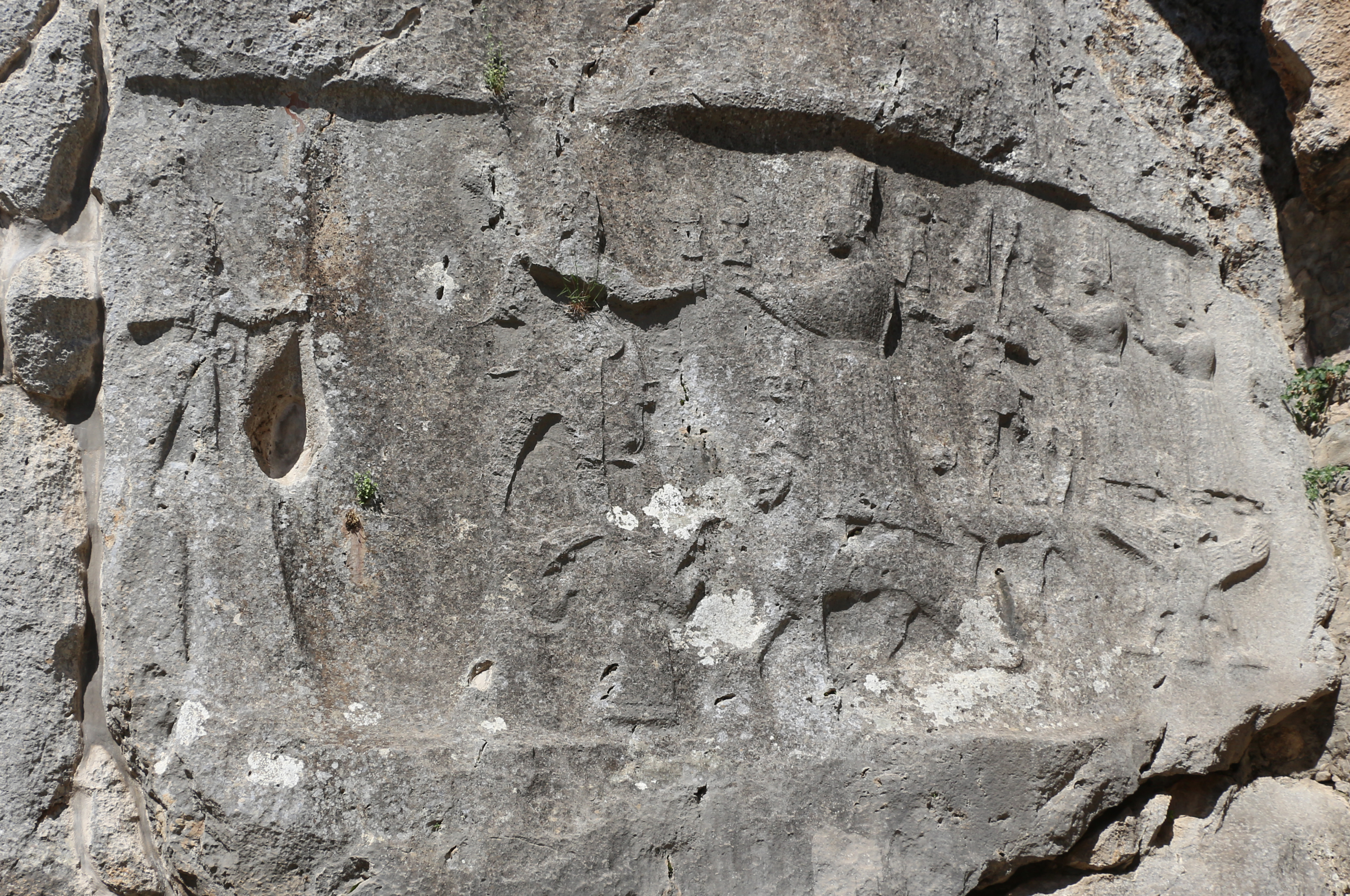
Šarruma (third figure from the right) on a leopard, depicted alongside his family on the procession relief from Yazılıkaya.

The king best known under the throne name Tudhaliya III was originally named Tašmi-Šarruma. Queen Puduḫepa reportedly saw Šarruma in a dream in which he required her to create a dozen sanctuaries for him. Tudhaliya IV considered him his personal protective deity. In Yazılıkaya, in addition to a depiction of Šarruma in the procession of deities (figure 44, standing on a leopard behind his mother, in front of his two sisters), a separate relief shows him embracing Tudhaliya IV. It is possible that chamber B, where it is located, served as the burial place of said king, with the presence of Šarruma reflecting the belief that protective deities of specific individuals still fulfilled that role after their death with regards to their tombs.

=== Ugaritic reception ===
Šarruma is also attested in the Ugaritic texts, according to Marie-Claude Trémouille as a result of Hittite influence, similarly as in the case of evidence from Aleppo and Emar. In the list of deities RS 24.246, parts of which correspond to ritual texts, he is placed after Kothar and before Pidray. He appears in a comparable position among deities receiving sacrificial cows in RS 1.001. Text on a lung model from Ugarit (RS 24.277) mentions a sacrifice to Šarruma too, though it is not certain if it can be classified as a divinatory practice as sometimes proposed.

Wilfred H. van Soldt notes that Šarruma was relatively commonly invoked in theophoric names of the inhabitants of Ugarit. A total of twenty eight examples have been identified in texts dated to the period between 1350 and 1220 BCE, though three of them belonged to people from outside the city. Two children of the Ugaritic king Niqmepa and his wife Aḫat-Milku, who hailed from Amurru, bore Hurrian theophoric names invoking him, Ḫišmi-Šarruma and ÌR-Šarruma, which reflected a tradition typical for their mother's place of origin. However, this case is considered an outlier, as it has been noted that Hurrian personal names are otherwise uncommon among members of the Ugaritic royal family, with Ar-Ḫalba being the only person with a Hurrian name to ever ascend to the throne.

=== Luwian reception ===
Šarruma was also worshiped by Luwians. The construction of a temple dedicated to him is mentioned in an inscription from Tabal attributed to a servant of the local king Tuwati. As noted by Manfred Hutter, the local pantheon of this kingdom shows strong Hurrian influence, but it is not clear if the same was the case for earlier Luwian beliefs in the same region in the second millennium BCE. Šarruma also continued to appear in theophoric names, such as Ḫuḫasarma, "Šarruma is the ancestor", or Šandašarme, a combination of two theonyms, the other being Šanta. It has been noted that most of them combine his name, consistently written logographically, with Luwian elements, in contrast with earlier largely Hurrian examples. In Cilicia and Lycia he continued to be worshiped as late as in the Hellenistic period, as reflected in the continuous use of names invoking him. It has been proposed that one possible example, Sar(ru)ma-piya (Σαρμαπιας) is attested in a Greek text from Diokaisareia, though as stressed by Ignasi-Xavier Adiego it is not certain if the restoration is correct. An additional problem for interpretation of uncertain cases is the existence of Luwian names with the element zalma, seemingly "protection", which can be confused with the theonym Šarruma.
