= Gözlükule =

Tumulus in Turkey

- Location within Turkey
- 36°54′44″N 34°53′45″E
- Type: Settlement
- Periods: Neolithic Age
- Location: Tarsus, Mersin Province, Turkey
- Region: Mediterranean Region

Site notes
- Excavation dates: 1934-1939
- Archaeologists: Hetty Goldman

Gözlükule is a tumulus within the borders of Tarsus city, Mersin Province, Turkey. It is now a park with an altitude of 22 metres (72 ft) with respect to surrounding area.

== History ==
Initially settled in the Neolithic Period, Gözlükule became an important settlement and a port during the 2nd millennium BC. It was located at the intersection of the main road systems, one following the Mediterranean sea side, the other following valleys through Toros Mountains to Anatolian plateau (so called Cilician Gates). Eventually the city of Tarsus was established just north of Gözlükule. But Gözlükule was still active as the port of Cilicia. In 41 BC Cleopatra VII and Mark Antony entered Tarsus using the port of Gözlükule.

In later years, the coastline moved to south because of the sediment carried by the Berdan River and Gözlükule lost its importance as a port.

== Archaeology ==
Before the official excavations began, the tumulus had been partially damaged. During the French occupation of Tarsus following World War I, a French battalion had been deployed on Gözlükule. It is believed that this operation resulted in some depredation.

The initial excavations between 1934 and 1939 were carried out by a team from Bryn Mawr College and the Institute for Advanced Study led by Hetty Goldman. She was the first officially sanctioned woman archeologist. After being interrupted by World War II, some additional work went on from 1947 to 1949. The stratification recovered at the site is important in Bronze Age Anatolian chronology.

In 2001, Boğaziçi University began to work at the site, with excavations beginning in 2007. Boğaziçi University announced that it will open a research center in Tarsus on 18 February 2017.

=== The finds ===
- Neolithic age: pieces of plaster, obsidian tools, arrowheads, spears, ceramic
- Chalcolithic age: jars, pots, water jags
- Bronze Age: bronze weapons, stamps, ruins of adobe buildings, city wall, part of the treaty signed between Telepinu, the king of the Hittites, and Isputahsu of Kizuwatna (Hittite vassal state), the stamp of Isputahsu, the stamp of Puduhepa, the Hittite queen, a crystal sculpture

== See also ==
- Cities of the ancient Near East
- Machteld Mellink
- Yumuktepe
