= Allanzu =

Hurrian goddess

- "Young woman of Ḫepat"
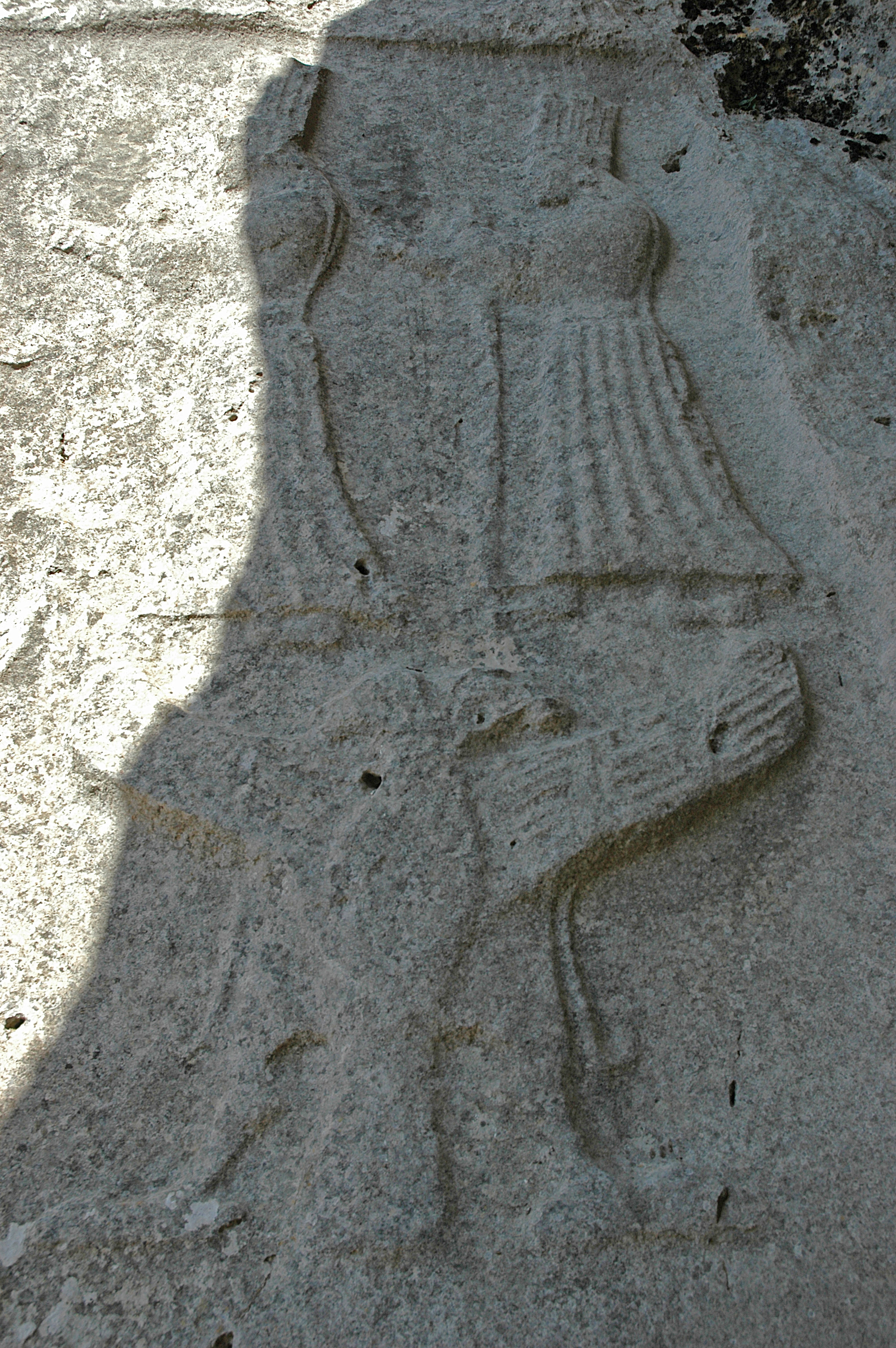
- A relief from Yazılıkaya depicting two figures identified as Allanzu and Kunzišalli.
- Other names: Alasuwa
- Major cult center: Tabal

Genealogy
- Parents: Ḫepat and Teshub
- Siblings: Šarruma, Kunzišalli

Allanzu, later known under the name Alasuwa, was a Hurrian goddess regarded as a daughter of Ḫepat. She was described as a youthful deity and in known texts often appears in association with her mother and siblings. She was also worshiped by Hittites and Luwians.

== Character and associations with other deities ==
Allanzu's status as a youthful deity is regarded as her primary characteristic. She could be referred to as the "young woman of Ḫepat", ^{d}Ḫepat=(v)e šiduri. Andrew R. George states that the term šiduri is particularly well attested as her epithet. She was regarded as a daughter of Ḫepat and Teshub. Gary Beckman tentatively suggests that similarly to how under Hurrian influence Teshub could take place of the Hittite weather god Tarḫunna in Hittite sources, and Ḫepat of the Sun goddess of Arinna, Mezulla might have been associated with Allanzu in an analogous manner.

In Hurrian tradition Allanzu formed a dyad with her mother, and they could receive offerings together. Worship of dyads of functionally related deities is a well attested feature of Hurrian religion, with some of the other examples including Išḫara and Allani or Ninatta and Kulitta. Allanzu's siblings were Šarruma and Kunzišalli. In sources from the first millennium BCE, Allanzu and Šarrumma were instead regarded as a couple, which might have been a development rooted in the religion of Tabal.

In addition to the singular Allanzu, a pair of lesser hypostases of her, known as Allanzunni, is also attested, and reflects a broader tradition of northern Syria and southern Anatolia, other examples of which include for example Maliya's Maliyanni ("small Maliya goddesses") or Šarruma's Šarrumanni. Beckman suggests they might have been regarded as her daughters. The term Allanzunni is referenced in a prayer of queen Puduḫepa (KUB 15.1), "O two Šarrummanni-s and one Alanzunni, you who from the womb of the god are sprung".

== Worship ==
Allanzu is attested alongside deities such as her siblings Šarruma and Kunzišalli, as well as Takitu, Nabarbi, Šuwala, Adamma, Kubaba and others as a member of the circle of Ḫepat in kaluti, a type of Hurrian offering lists. She is also among the deities mentioned in a ritual text focused on the Hurrian religious concept of šarrena.

According to Mary R. Bachvarova, Allanzu is mentioned alongside the storm gods of Adalaur and Aleppo, as well as the goddesses Allatum and Lelluri in the Hittite text Annals of Hattusili when the eponymous king enumerates the deities he brought from the city of Hassum to a temple of Mezulla in Hattusa, thus incorporating them into Hittite religion. She was also worshiped alongside Ḫepat in the Hittite city of Ankuwa, the cult center of Kataḫḫa. Furthermore, two figures depicted alongside Ḫepat in the Yazılıkaya sanctuary (reliefs number 45 and 46 in the standard listing used in modern literature) are presumed to be Allanzu and Kunzišalli. An accompanying inscription refers to the former simply as the daughter of Teshub.

Allanzu-Ḫeba, a feminine personal name known from Emar, according to Volkert Haas might be connected to the well attested Ḫepat-Allanzu dyad.

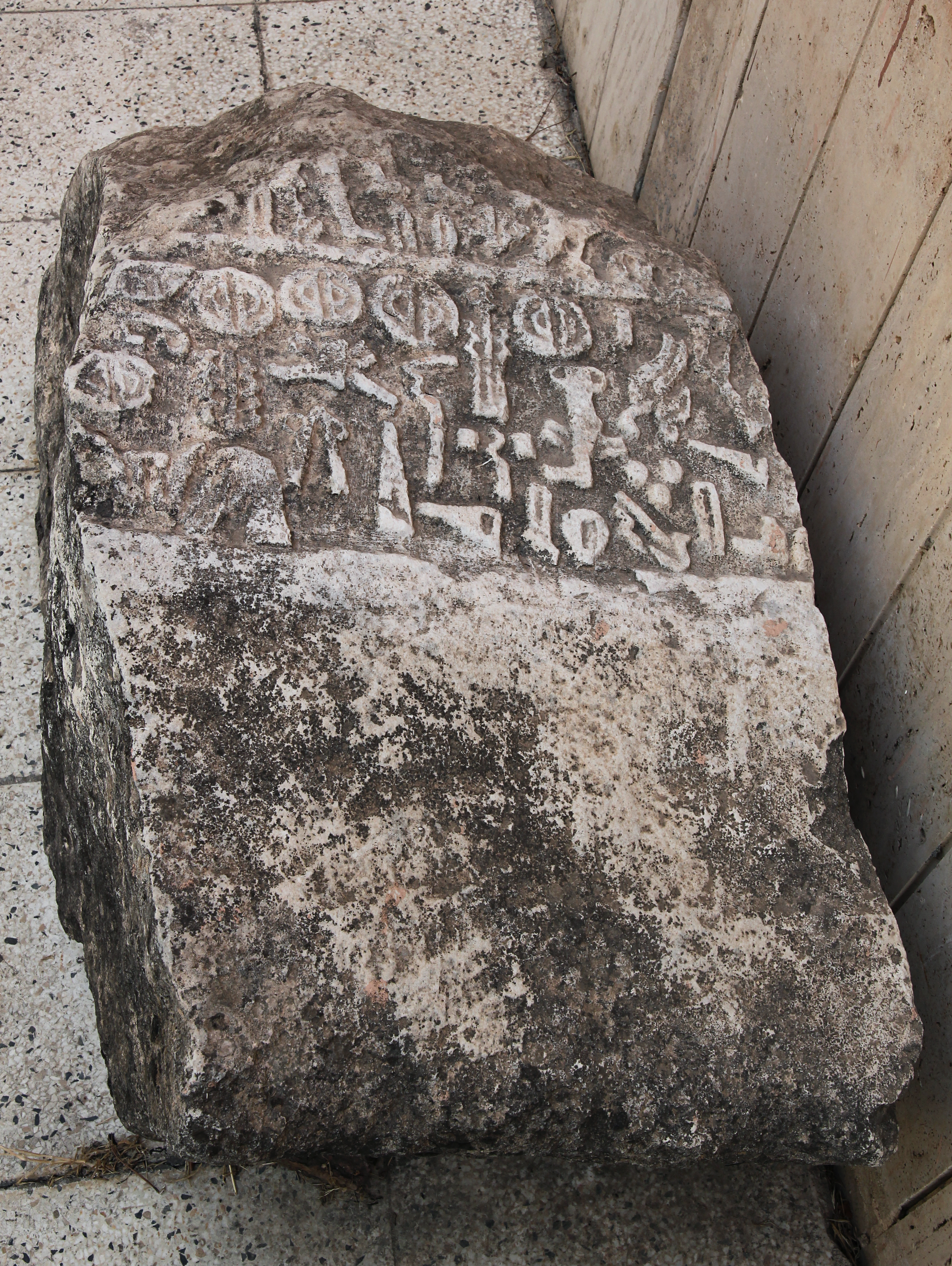
Ancoz 9.

In the first millennium BCE, Allanzu continued to be worshiped by Luwians, who referred to her as Alasuwa. The correspondence between these two names has been established based on the fact that both in most cases occur immediately after Šarruma, whether the text is written in cuneiform or Luwian hieroglyphs. One of the Hieroglyphic Luwian inscriptions from Ancoz, Ancoz 9, mentions the offering of a gazelle to Tarhunza, Ḫepat, Šarruma, Alasuwa and an unknown deity. References to construction of temples dedicated to her are also known.
