= Gözlükule Research Center =

Turkish research center

Gözlükule Research Center is an archaeological research center in Tarsus, Turkey.

The building is at 36°54′53″N 34°53′43″E in Tarsus ilçe (district) of Mersin Province. It is an abandoned one century-old ginnery that was recently restored. In 2002, it was acquired by the government and in 2007 was allocated to Boğaziçi University for researches in Tarsus archaeology.

Dr Aslı Özyar, the chief of the archaeological team says that up until recently, the ginney was used as a depot, but that as the restoration progressed a research center was established. The opening ceremony of the research center was held on 18 February 2017. It is planned that the restoration will be complete in one year.

In this center, the archaeological research about the Neolithic settlement Gözlükule will be carried out. The distance between the center and the excavation site is merely 200 metres (660 ft). In the center, there will be offices, laboratories, depots and guest houses.
