= Sunassura =

King of Kizzuwatna
- Reign: c. 1450 BC

Sunassura (Šunaššura; fl. c. 1450 BC) was the king of Kizzuwatna in Anatolia in the 15th century BC. He concluded the Sunassura Treaty with the Hittite king Tudhaliya I. Some scholars also believe that there was a second king Sunassura soon after, at the end of the 15th century, who was the last independent ruler of Kizzuwatna.

A dispute between Sunassura and Niqmepa of Alalakh was adjudicated by King Shaushtatar of Mitanni. This is recorded on two tablets (AIT 13 and AIT 14) that were found at Alalakh.

Sunassura's treaty with the Hittite king Tudḫaliya I marked the end of Kizzuwatna's independence. Later, Kizzuwatna was integrated into Hittite.

Before Sunassura, under king Pilliya, Kizzuwatna was under the Mitanni overlordship. The region was strategically important for the Hittites because of its location connecting Anatolia and Syria. In the treaty between Tudhaliya and Sunassura, the city of Urshu marked the eastern frontier of Kizzuwatna.

== Sunassura Treaty ==
According to Boaz Stavi,

"Several copies of treaties between Hatti and Sunaššura, king of Kizzuwatna, were discovered, some written in Akkadian, and others in Hittite. The Hittite version of the treaty has two copies, A and B, which apparently represent two different treaties with Sunaššura; Copy B, in which Kizzuwatna was granted better conditions, can be probably dated slightly earlier than Copy A ..."

Based on quite significant differences among these 3 ancient texts, some scholars have proposed that there were actually two separate and successive treaties between Tudhaliya of the Hittites and Sunassura of Kizzuwatna. For example, Jacques Freu posited that 'the Šunaššura Treaty' reflects successive equal and unequal treaty arrangements under two different sets of kings on both sides. Thus, Freu also makes a distinction between two 15th-century BC Hittite great kings named Tudḫaliya.

Gary Beckman, on the other hand, thinks that these two were successive arrangements under a single Hittite king. In other words, while only one Hittite king Tudhaliya reigned for a long time, there were two successive Kizzuwatnan kings, Sunassura I and Sunassura II, who interacted with the Hittite empire.

In his 2011 dissertation, Boaz Stavi examines the possibility that the relations between Hatti and Mittanni were quite strong during the reign of Tudhaliya I, Tudhaliya II's grandfather. Thus, Kizzuwatna's real conflict with Hatti would have begun either at "the end of Tudhaliya I's reign, [during] the reign of Arnuwanda I, or the beginning of Tudhaliya II's ruling".

== Sunassura II ==
King Sunassura II of Kizzuwatna is posited by some scholars. He would have ruled later in the 15th-century BC, at the time of Tudhaliya II and Shaushtatar of Mittani. This was the time of conflict between Mittani and Hatti. It was perhaps in this context that Tudḫaliya II concluded his unequal treaty with Šunaššura II of Kizzuwatna, recalling that country's earlier treaty under Tudḫaliya II’s grandfather.

== See also ==
- Cilicia

== Bibliography ==
- Beal, Richard H (1986). "The History of Kizzuwatna and the Date of the Šunaššura Treaty". Orientalia. Vol. 55. pp. 424ff.
- Börker-Klähn, J. 1996. Grenzfälle: Šunaššura und Sirkeli oder die Geschichte Kizzuwatnas. UF 28: 37–104.
- HOUWINK TEN CATE, PHILO H. J.. "An alternative Date for the Sunassuras Treaty (KBo 1.5)" Altorientalische Forschungen, vol. 25, no. 1, 1998, pp. 34-53
- Wilhelm, G. 2011. Vertrag Tutḫaliyas I. mit Šunaššura von Kizzuwatna (1. akk. Fassung; CTH 41.I.1).
- Wilhelm, G., “Zur ersten Zeile des Šunaššura-Vertrages”, in: Documentum Asiae Minoris Antiquae. Festschrift fur Heinrich Otten zum 75. Geburtstag, Neu, E. / Rüster, Chr. (éds.). Harrassowitz, Wiesbaden, 1988, 359-370.
