= Isputahsu =

King of Kizzuwatna

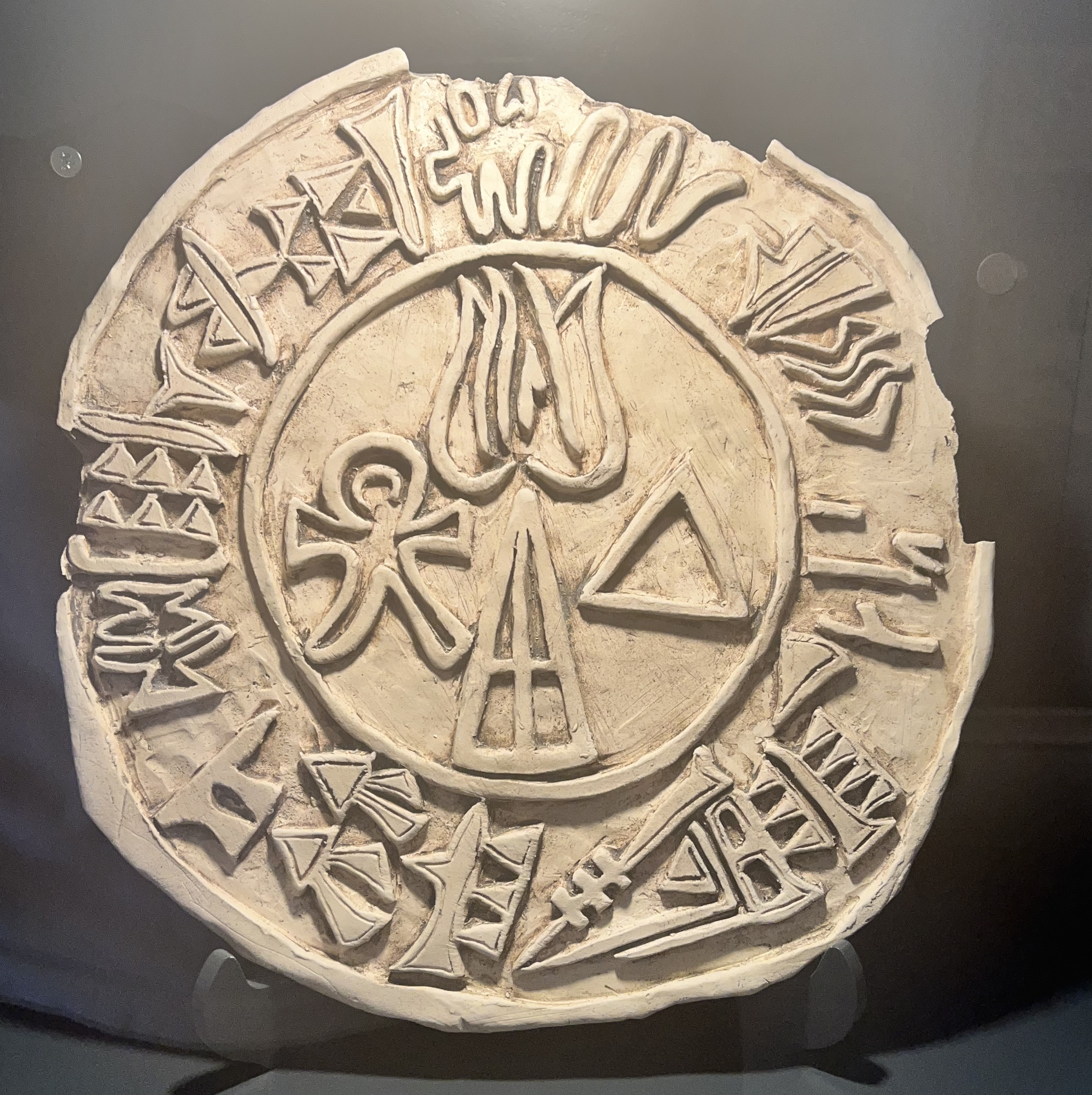
Seal of Isputashu

Isputahsu (also transliterated as Išputaḫšu) was a king of Kizzuwatna, probably during the late 16th century BC (middle chronology). He signed a treaty of alliance with the Hittite king Telepinu.

== Family ==
His father was Pariyawatri, who perhaps was not a king.

The name of Isputahsu is Hittite and not Luwian.

== Reign ==
The first king of free Cilicia, Isputahsu was recorded as a "great king" in both cuneiform and Hittite hieroglyphs. A treaty between Ishputahshu and Telepinu is recorded in both Hittite and Akkadian.
