= Ninatta and Kulitta =

Hurrian goddesses from the entourage of Šauška

- Attendants of Šauška, divine musicians
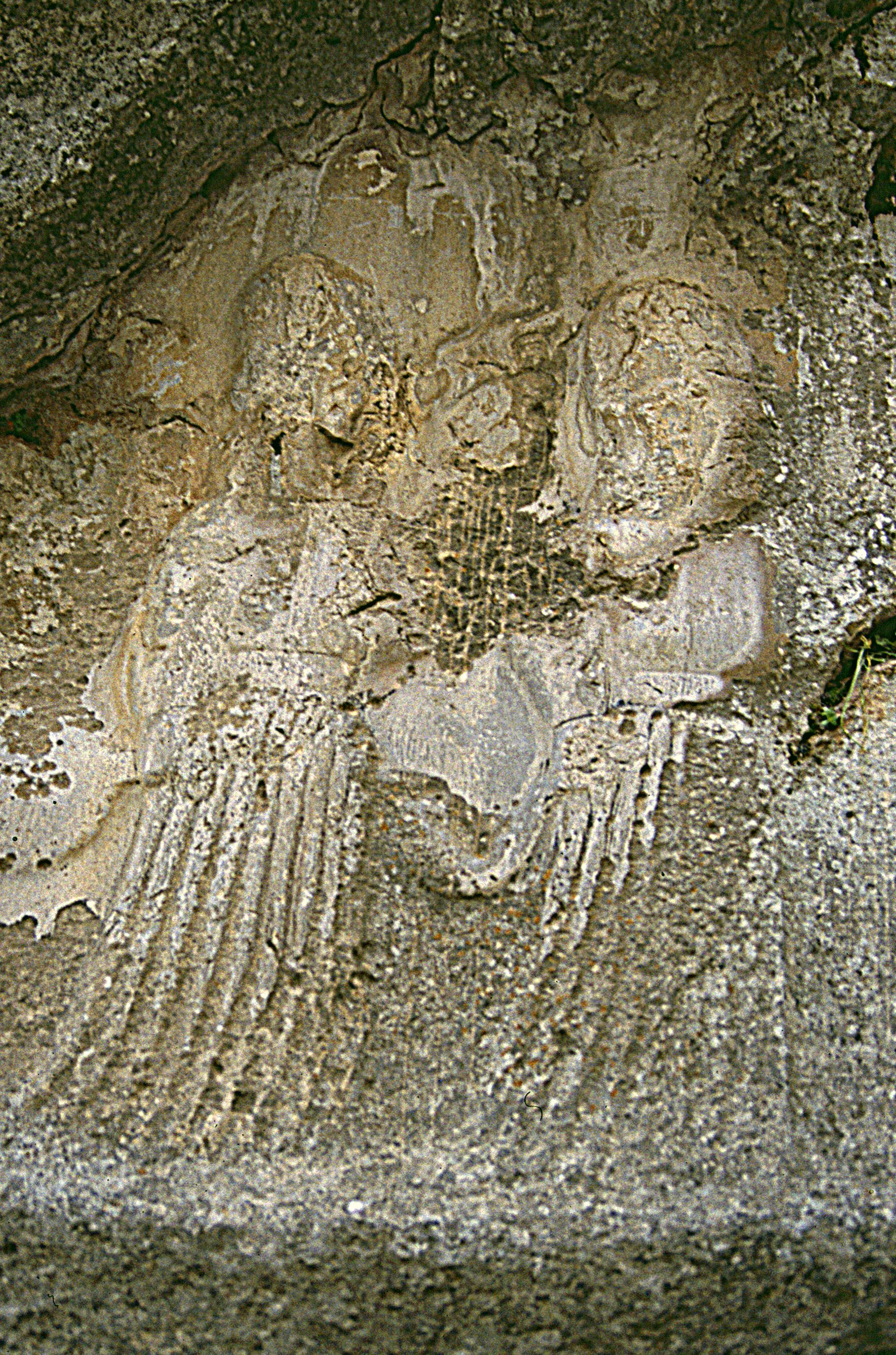
- A relief from Yazılıkaya depicting Ninatta and Kulitta.
- Major cult center: Hattusa, Ugarit, Arbela

Ninatta and Kulitta were a dyad of Hurrian goddesses regarded as the handmaidens of Šauška. They were primarily considered divine musicians, though they also had a warlike aspect. They are attested in western Hurrian sources from Ugarit and Hattusa. They were also incorporated into the Hittite and Mesopotamian pantheons.

== Names ==
In addition to the standard forms of Ninatta's and Kulitta's names known from Hurrian and Hittite texts, Akkadian variants Ninitum and Kulittum are known from Neo-Assyrian sources. In the Ugaritic alphabetic script the names were rendered as, respectively, nnt and klt. It has been argued that the terms Ninattani and Kulitanni could be used to refer to them as a pair. However, Piotr Taracha instead argues that they should be understood as designations for minor hypostases of both individual goddesses, per analogy with Maliyanni, Allanzunni or Šarrumanni.

When they are mentioned together, Ninatta always precedes Kulitta. They were worshiped together as a dyad, which is considered an example of a phenomenon widespread in Hurrian religion, in which pairs of related deities were often believed to act as a unity and were therefore venerated together, as also attested in the case of Allani and Išḫara or Hutena and Hutellura. Volkert Haas argued Ninatta and Kulitta were regarded as twins.

John MacGinnis assigns Hurrian origin to both Ninatta and Kulitta. Gabrielle Frantz-Szabó suggested that Kulitta's name might have originated in one of the Anatolian languages, and pointed out that it is phonetically similar to the personal names ku-li-e-it and ku-li-a-it and the mountain name ^{ḫur.sag}ku-li-ta-ḫa-ṷa, though she ultimately considered the origin of both her and Ninatta's names to be uncertain. Joan Goodnick Westenholz proposed that Ninatta's name might be derived from the toponym Ninêt (ni-ne-et^{ki}) or Nenit (ne-en-it^{ki}) known from documents from Mari and Tell al-Rimah, which might be the Amorite name of Nineveh. Occasional references to a goddess called "Ishtar of Ninêt" are also known from these locations. Westenholz tentatively suggested connecting her with Šauška, Ishtar of Nineveh and Ninatta, though she stressed it is not possible to ascertain the relationship between these deities and their names in the earliest periods.

== Character ==
Ninatta and Kulitta were regarded as the handmaidens of Šauška, the Hurrian counterpart of Mesopotamian Ishtar. In ritual texts they could be grouped with other members of this deity's entourage. Examples of other attendants of Šauška include Šintal-wuri (Hurrian: "seven-eyed"), Šintal-irti ("seven-breasted"), Šinan-tatukarni ("twofold at [?] love"), Namrazunna (from Akkadian namru, "shining", and Zunna, a Hurrianized spelling of Suen). and the sukkal Undurumma. In the first millennium BCE Ninatta and Kulitta came to be incorporated into the entourages of Ishtar of Arbela, Ishtar of Assur, and Ishtar of Nineveh.

Typically Ninatta and Kulitta were portrayed as divine musicians. They had a warlike aspect as well, which presumably reflected the analogous role assigned to Šauška, and they were sometimes invoked directly before her "right weapon" (panti šauri) of Šauška; it has been suggested that this term referred to them metaphorically.

The only depiction of Ninatta and Kulitta identified with certainty is a relief from the Yazilikaya sanctuary. They are shown in a procession of deities, directly behind the male aspect of Šauška. Textual sources additionally refer to placing statues representing them on the sides of a depiction of Šauška.

== Worship ==
Ninatta and Kulitta are presently attested in Hurrian context in western sources, namely in texts from Ugarit and Hattusa. They appear alongside Šauška in offering lists (kaluti) dedicated to the circle of Ḫepat. In the text RS 24.261, which documents a ritual combining Hurrian and Ugaritic elements focused on Šauška and closely associated local goddess Ashtart, Ninatta and Kulitta are listed in sequence as recipients of offerings twice, once after an unidentified deity and before Nupatik, and once after Nikkal and before Adamma.

=== Hittite reception ===
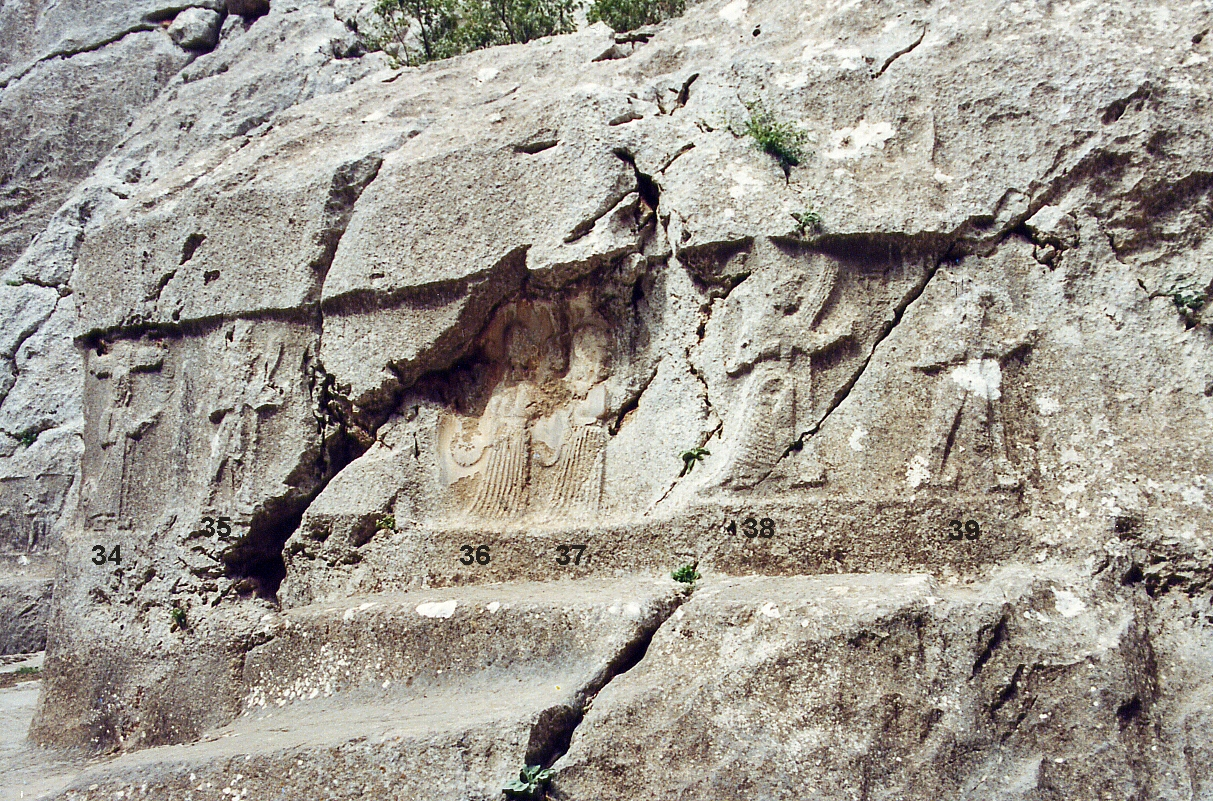
Ninatta and Kulitta (figures 36 and 37) among other Hurrian deities on the Yazılıkaya reliefs.

Like many other Hurrian deities, Ninatta and Kulitta were incorporated into the Hittite pantheon. They are among the members of the Hurrian pantheon portrayed on the walls of the Yazılıkaya sanctuary. They received offerings during the AN.TAḪ.ŠUM festival alongside Šauška of Ḫattarina, Šimige, Aya and Ḫepat-Mušuni. They are also listed alongside Šauška of Nineveh as recipients of drink offerings and a sacrificial sheep in the ritual CTH 714, which focuses on bathing a statue of Šauška.

Hittite sources also attest that Ninatta and Kulitta could serve as divine witnesses of treaties, as attested for the first time in such formal agreements between Šuppiluliuma I with Ḫuqqana of Ḫayaša and Tette of Nuḫašše. They also appear in the Egyptian version of the treaty between the Hittite Empire and Egypt originally compiled in 1259 BCE, during the reign of Ramesses II to cement peace established after the end of a conflict between these two states which culminated with the battle of Kadesh. Their names are prefaced by the determinative pꜢ-nṯr, which indicates that the Egyptian scribe mistakenly assumed that both of them were male. Since a similar mistake is also attested in the case of Ḫepat, Itamar Singer concluded that presumably the cuneiform sign dingir which prefaced theonyms was misunderstood in translation.

=== Mesopotamian reception ===
In the first millennium BCE Ninatta and Kulitta were worshiped in Arbela in Egašankalamma, the temple of Ishtar of Arbela. They are listed together among the deities of this city in a tākultu ritual from the reign of Ashurbanipal (tablet K 252). John MacGinnish suggests that their presence in the local pantheon might indicate that Arbela originally belonged to the Hurrian cultural milieu. Alternatively, their introduction might have been the result of syncretism between Ishtar of Arbela and Ishtar of Nineveh.

According to Beate Pongratz-Leisten, Kulitta might additionally be attested in a Neo-Assyrian ritual from Assur as a recipient of offerings alongside Ashur, Ishtar and the Sebitti, though only a part of the name is preserved, making the identification uncertain.

== Mythology ==
Ninatta and Kulitta appear in the Song of Ḫedammu, one of the myths belonging to the so-called "Kumarbi cycle", which describes a conflict over kingship among the gods between the eponymous god, his son Teshub and their respective allies. They assist their mistress Šauška during her attempt at subduing Ḫedammu with a love potion. They are instructed to play their instruments, arkammi and galgalturi, to lure him out of the sea.

According to Meindert Dijkstra's restoration of the myth of Ḫašarri, Ninatta and Kulitta also appear in this composition, with one of the surviving sections possibly describing them threshing grain.
