= Pilliya =

15th century BCE king of Kizzuwatna

Treaty clay tablet
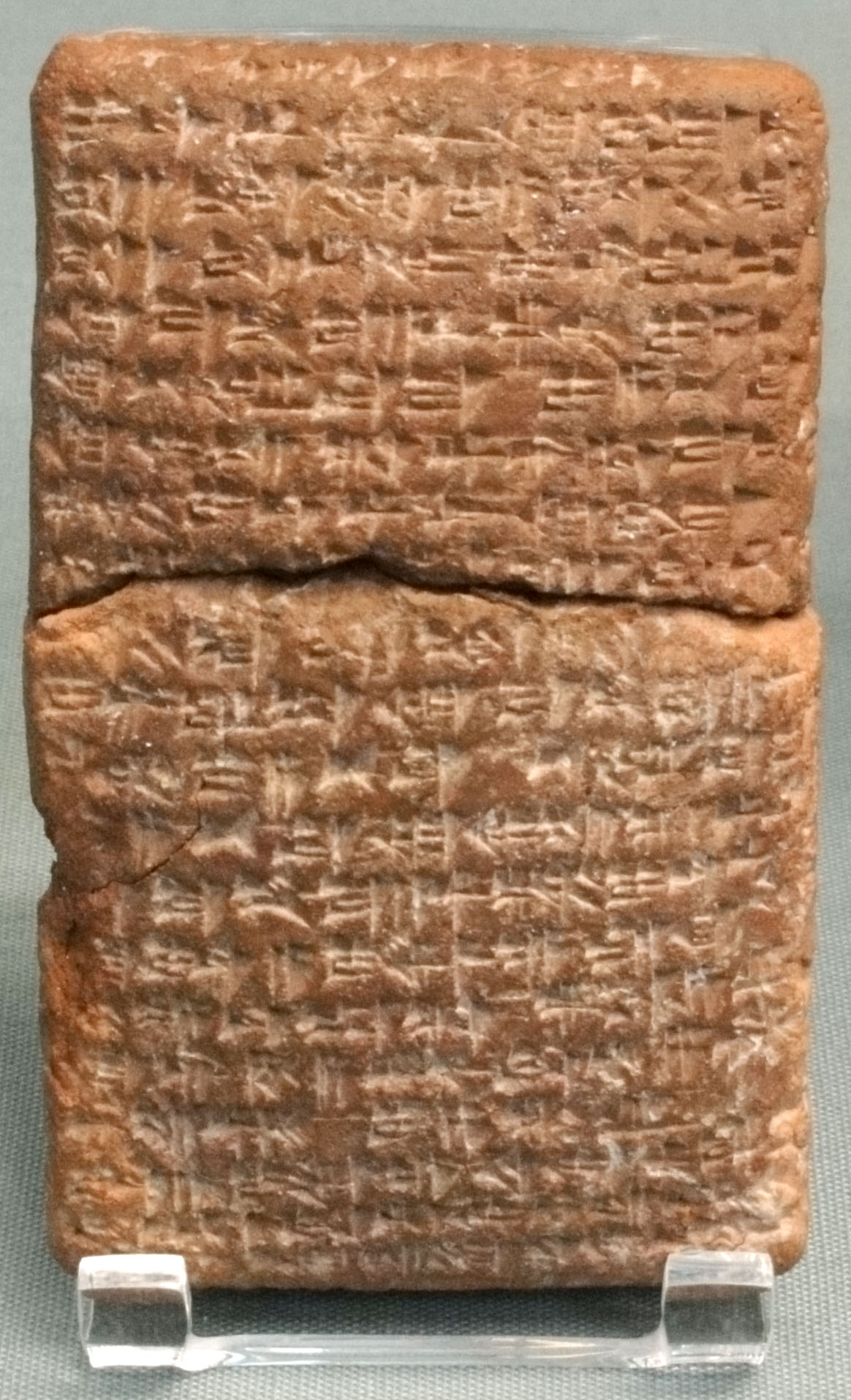
- Fugitive slave treaty between Idrimi and Pilliya
- Size: Length: 12 cm (4.7 in); Width: 6.4 cm (2.5 in)
- Writing: cuneiform
- Created: 1480BC (about)
- Present location: Room 54, British Museum, London
- Identification: 131447

Pilliya was a king of Kizzuwatna ca. the 15th century BC (short chronology). He signed a treaty with Idrimi of Alalakh, allying with the Mitanni empire.

He made peace with Zidanta II.
