= Daniel E. Fleming =

American Assyriologist and biblical scholar (born 1957)

Daniel Edward Fleming
- Born: September 3, 1957
- Occupations: Assyriologist, Biblical Scholar
- Title: Edelman Professor of Hebrew and Judaic Studies, Skirball Department of Hebrew and Judaic Studies at New York University
- Spouse: Nancy
- Awards: Guggenheim Fellowship (2004-05); American Council of Learned Societies Fellowship (2004-05); Senior Fulbright Fellowship to France (1997-98); National Endowment for the Humanities Summer Stipend (1991)

Academic background
- Education: B.A. (1979), M.Div. (1985), Ph.D. (1990)
- Alma mater: Stanford University; Gordon-Conwell Theological Seminary; Harvard University
- Thesis: 'The Installation of Baal's High Priestess at Emar: A Window on Ancient Syrian Religion' (1990)
- Doctoral advisor: William L. Moran

Academic work
- Discipline: Hebrew Bible, Assyriology
- Sub-discipline: Emar, history of second-millennium Syria and first-millennium Levant, ancient Israel socio-religious history
- Institutions: New York University
- Notable works: The Legacy of Israel in Judah's Bible: History, Politics, and the Reinscribing of Tradition (2012)
- Website: https://nyu.academia.edu/DFleming

Daniel Edward Fleming is an American biblical scholar and Assyriologist whose work centers on Hebrew Bible interpretation and cultural history, ancient Syria, Emar, ancient religion, and the interplay of ancient Near Eastern societies. Since 1990, he has served as a professor of Hebrew Bible and Ancient Near Eastern Studies in the Skirball Department of Hebrew and Judaic Studies at New York University, where he has spent his whole career.

He completed a Ph.D. in Near Eastern Languages and Civilizations from Harvard University in 1990. After receiving his Ph.D., he was immediately appointed to the Department of Hebrew and Judaic Studies at New York University.

== Research ==
Fleming works broadly in ancient Near Eastern history, with anchors especially in second-millennium Syria and the first-millennium Levant as a matrix for ancient Israel and the Hebrew Bible. His research involves straddling two separate and sometimes territorial disciplines: Assyriology and biblical studies—both defined by written evidence that must be placed in context based on archaeological and visual sources as well. His framework for treating these domains as part of a whole is ultimately historical, and Fleming's individual projects have probed various aspects of the social fabric and political patterns that characterize the region in broad terms. He collaborated with Sophie Démare-Lafont of the University of Paris law school to create a social history of Emar in Syria, primarily by utilizing practical legal documents from the era. He also worked with Lauren Monroe of Cornell University, to reevaluate the names available in order to explain the politics of the Iron Age before the kingdoms of Israel and Judah.

=== The Legacy of Israel in Judah's Bible ===
In his 2012 monograph The Legacy of Israel in Judah's Bible: History, Politics, and the Reinscribing of Tradition, Fleming puts forth a new theory and methodology for Hebrew Bible scholarship: isolating a tentative repertoire of Israelite traditions that can then be compared with external sources of historical evidence. After letting his theory serve as a catalyst for his doctoral students' research for several years, the publication set a new agenda for future engagement of ancient Israel and Hebrew Bible scholarship with wider study of antiquity. According to Fleming, his theory:

ultimately attempts to bridge between the worlds of biblical scholarship and archaeologically based history ... It addresses the structure and character of the Bible's primary narrative through [his] vision of a particular relationship between a hodgepodge of lore about early Israel that has been taken over and recast radically by generations of scribes from Judah. This Israelite lore, when considered on its own, presents a picture of ancient Israel that contrasts sufficiently with standard "biblical" schemes as to provoke reevaluation of what the Bible may offer historical investigation. It is [his] hope that by taking ever more seriously the biblical division between what comes from the distinct peoples of Israel and Judah, the character of each will come into sharper relief.

Fleming's work has received advanced praise among senior biblical scholars. David M. Carr writes that the monograph is "one of the most important books published in biblical studies in the last decade." Israel Finkelstein calls the book "a classic—a must for anyone interested in the Bible and the history of Ancient Israel." According to Mark S. Smith, Fleming's work "is a superb piece of scholarship," which "no professor or graduate student interested in the Hebrew Bible or ancient Israel can do without."
