= Kummanni =

Main center of the kingdom of Kizzuwatna

Kummanni was the name of the main center of the Anatolian kingdom of Kizzuwatna. Its location is uncertain, but it may have been near the classical settlement of Comana in Cappadocia.

Recent research also proposed as a location Sirkeli Höyük in Plain Cilicia. Since then, some additional evidence has been discussed indicating that Kummanni was located in Cilicia at Sirkeli Höyük. (The distance between Comana and Cilicia is not that great.)

Kummanni was the major cult center of the Hurrian chief deity, Tešup. Its Hurrian name Kummeni simply translates as "The Shrine."

The city persisted into the Early Iron Age, and appears as Kisuatni in Assyrian records. It was located in the east of Que, the successor of Kizzuwatna.

The town should not be confused with Kumme, a holy city for Assyrians and Urarteans, located in the highlands between Assyria and Urartu.

It is also sometimes proposed that in Hittite times there were two Kummanna's, one in the north and one in the south, corresponding to the two ancient sites (Κόμανα). The name belongs to Luwian kummaya ('pure, holy').
