= Lawazantiya =

Bronze Age city

- Tatarlı Höyük
- Location within Turkey
- 37°7′22″N 36°3′3″E
- Type: tell
- Cultures: Kizzuwatna; Hittites; Hurrians; Mitanni
- Location: Adana Province, Turkey
- Region: Cilicia

Lawazantiya (^{URU}La-wa(-az)-za-an-ti-ya) was a major Bronze Age city in the Kingdom of Kizzuwatna and the cultic city of the goddess Šauška. It was famous for its temple that got purification water from its seven springs. Today the best candidate for the site is Tatarli Höyük which is known for its seven springs.

== History ==
=== Middle Bronze ===
During the Old Assyrian Trade Network into Anatolia it was mentioned as Luhuzantiya. The earliest mention of the city comes from the Old Assyrian documents as a trading colony in Kaniš, where the place Luḫuzatia is often mentioned, which is common to Lawazantiya.

In the late 17th century BC, Lawazantiya was a target for Hittite expansion to the sea and the base of the military campaigns of Ḫattušili I (c. 1620 BC). He went northeast attacking Urshu and Hassu, which then got aid from Halap (Aleppo) and Carchemish.

=== Late Bronze ===
In Hittite texts the city is known as Lawazantiya (also: Lahuwazantiya, Lauwanzantiya or Lahuzzandiya), in Ugarit as Lwsnd and in Assyrian Annals as Lusanda. There is a Hittite document entitled "Festival of Teššub and Ḫebat of Lawazantiya" which has the king calling these deities in to open the spring festival.

In the Telipinu Edict that Hittite ruler (c. 1525-1500 BC) reports that the city had rebelled and been retaken.

In the 13th century BC, Hattušili III met and married Pudu-Heba, daughter of Pentipšarri, a priest of Šauška, in Lawazantiya. She was a strong promoter of Kizzuwatnean cults and traditions.

For the Festival for Teššup and Ḫebat of Lawazantiya, see CTH 699.

== Location ==
The city is known to have been part of the Kizzuwatna region. Gojko Barjamovic considers Luḫuzatia and Lawazantiya to be two separate localities, with the former locating in Elbistan. Meanwhile Lawazantiya might be located at Sirkeli Höyük. Tatarli Höyük has also been proposed as the location based on cylinder and stamp seals found at that site.
