= Yazılıkaya =

Capital city of the Hittite Empire

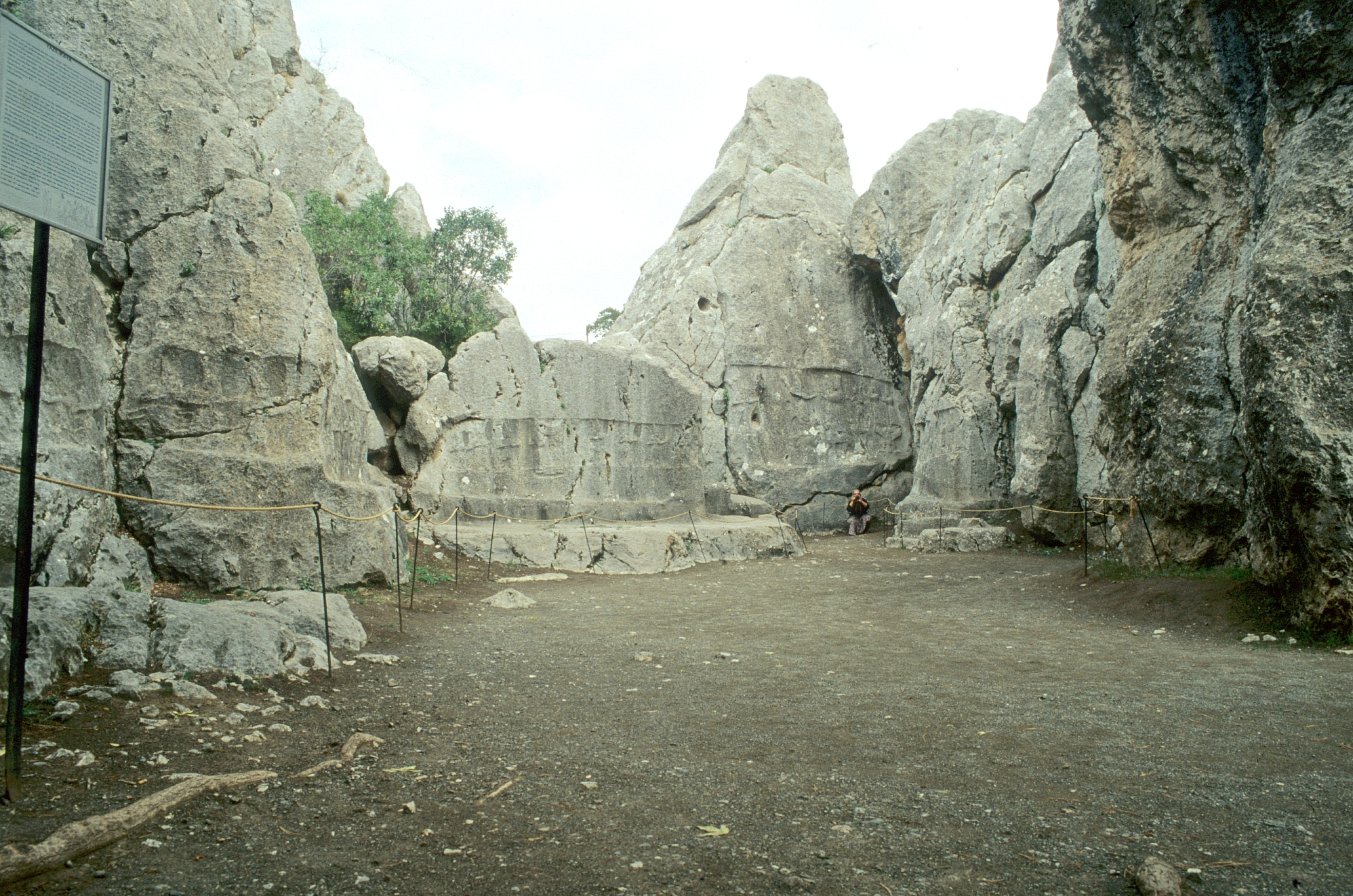
- Yazılıkaya

- Location within Turkey
- 40°01′30″N 34°37′58″E
- Type: Settlement
- Location: Çorum Province, Turkey
- Region: Anatolia

Site notes
- Condition: In ruins

Yazılıkaya, Eskişehir, also called Midas City, is a village with Phrygian ruins.

Yazılıkaya (Turkish: Inscribed rock) was a sanctuary of Hattusa, the capital city of the Hittite Empire, today in the Çorum Province, Turkey. Rock reliefs are a prominent aspect of Hittite art, and these are generally regarded as the most important group.

== History ==
This was a holy site for the Hittites, located within walking distance of the gates of the city of Hattusa. It had two main chambers formed inside a group of rock outcrops. Access to the roofless chambers were controlled by gateway and building structures built right in front of them, however only the foundations of those structures survived today. Most impressive today are the rock reliefs of Chambers A and B portraying the gods of the Hittite pantheon. One of the uses of the sanctuary may have involved the New Year's celebrations ceremonies. A 2019 journal article by Rita Gautschy and Eberhard Zangger suggested that the place may have served as a time-keeping device, with the carvings serving as markers for lunar and solar movement.

It was in use at least since the late 16th century BCE, but most of the rock carvings date to the reign of the Hittite kings Tudhaliya IV and Suppiluliuma II in the late 13th century BCE, when the site underwent a significant restoration.

The most impressive is Chamber A, which contains rock-cut relief of 64 deities in procession. The left wall shows a procession of male deities, wearing the traditional kilts, pointed shoes and horned hats. Mountain gods are also shown with scaled skirts to symbolise the rocky mountains. The right wall shows a procession of female deities wearing crowns and long skirts. The only exception to this divide is the goddess of love and war, Shaushka (Mesopotamian goddess Ishtar/Inanna) who is shown on the male procession with two female attendants. This is likely to be because of her male attributes as the goddess of war. The processions lead to a central scene of the supreme couple of the pantheon: the storm-god Teshub and the sun-goddess Hebat. Teshub stands on two mountain gods whilst Hebat stands on a panther. Behind Hebat are shown their son Sharruma, daughter Alanzu and a granddaughter.

The smaller and narrower Chamber B has fewer but larger and better preserved reliefs. It may have served as a mortuary mausoleum or memorial for the Hittite king Tudhaliya IV.

The Hittite practise of assimilating other cultures' gods into their own pantheon is in evidence at Yazilikaya. The Mesopotamian god of wisdom, Ea (Enki) is shown in the male procession and the god Teshub was a Hurrian god who was syncretized with the Hittite storm-god. Hebat's original consort was changed into her and Teshub's son (Sharruma) and she was later syncretized with the Hattic Sun goddess of Arinna. It is believed that Puduhepa, who was the daughter of a Hurrian priestess and the wife of the Hittite king Hattusili III, also played a role in the increasing Hurrian influence on the Hittite religion.

A 2021 study concluded that the sanctuary depicted the cosmos including its three levels: earth, sky, and underworld; in addition to the cyclical processes: day/night, lunar phases, and summer/winter, which served as a lunisolar calendar. However, the supreme deities in Chamber A, referred to the northern stars, while Chamber B represented the netherworld.

== Gallery ==
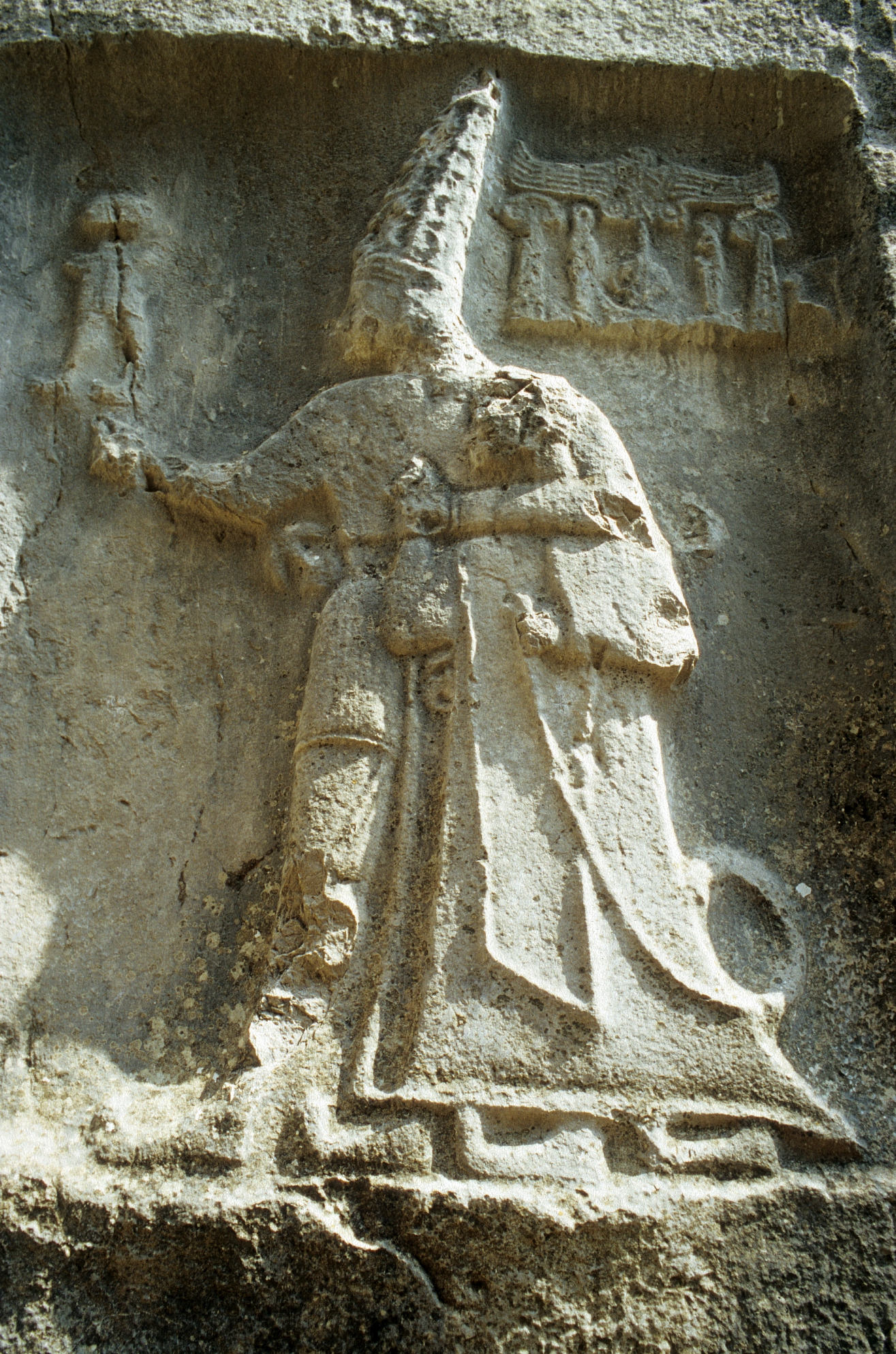
Rock carving in Chamber B depicting the god Sharruma and King Tudhaliya IV, dated to around 1250–1220 BCE

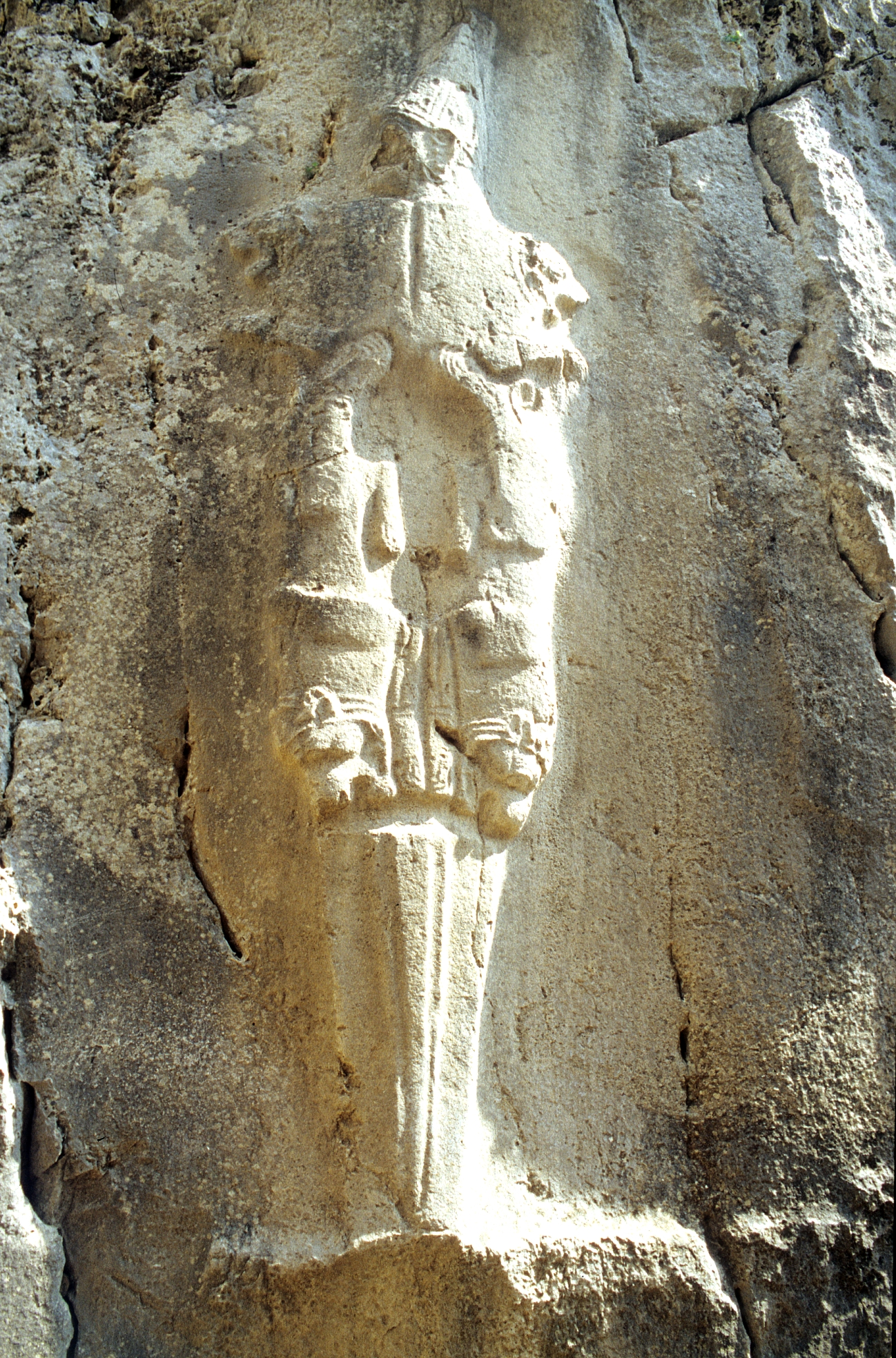
Nergal, the god of the underworld

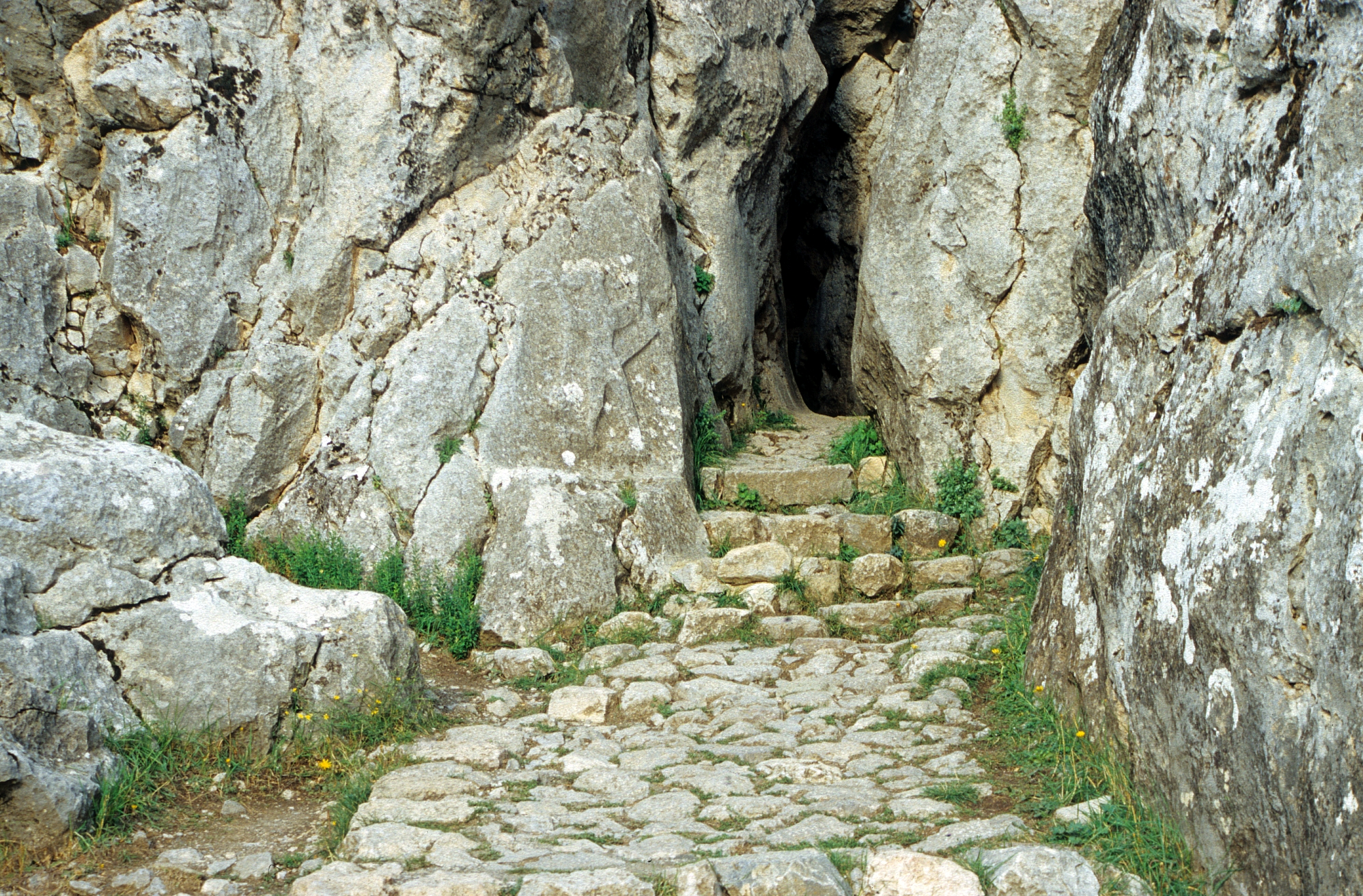
Entrance to Chamber B with demon relief

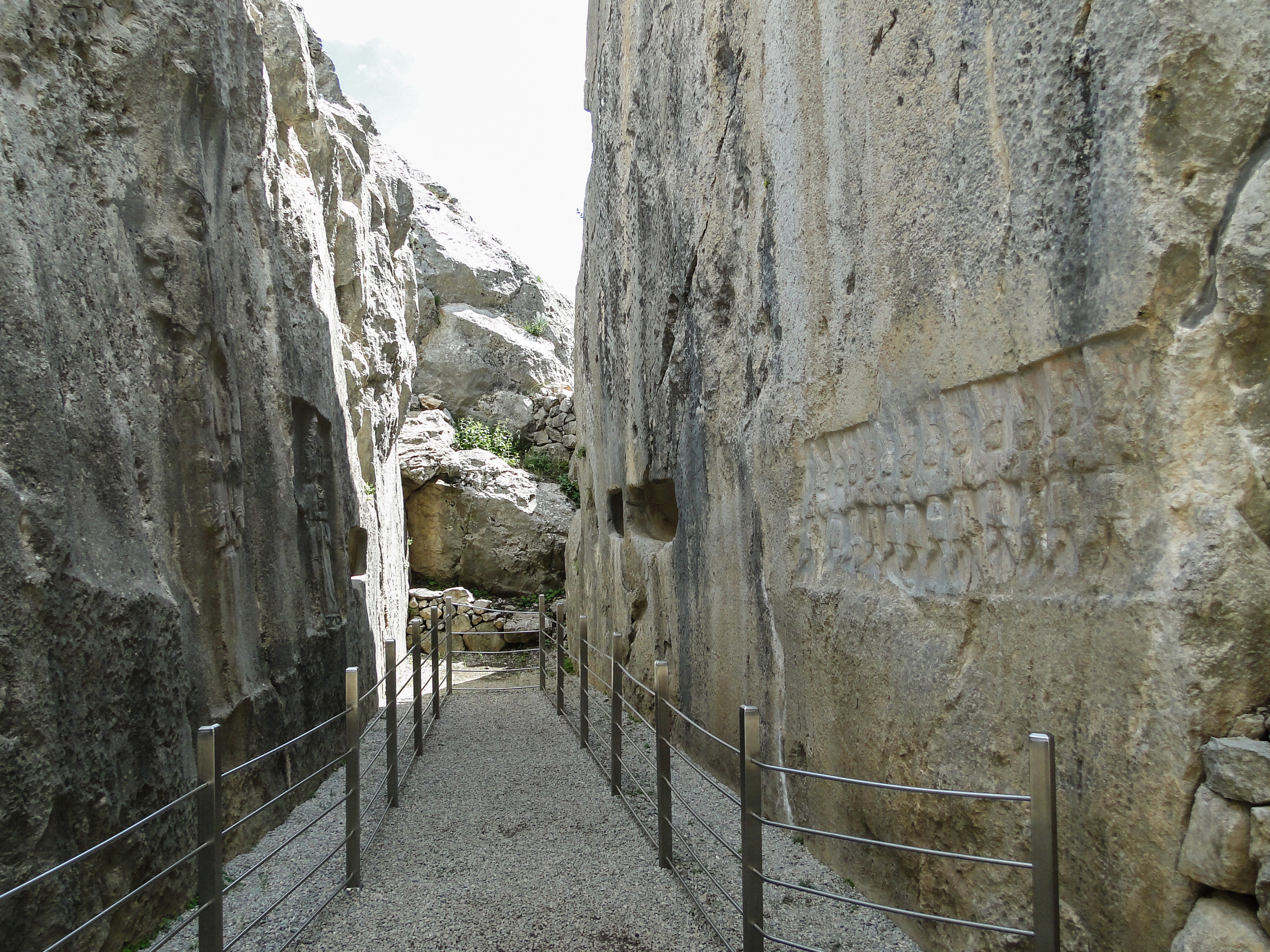
Chamber B

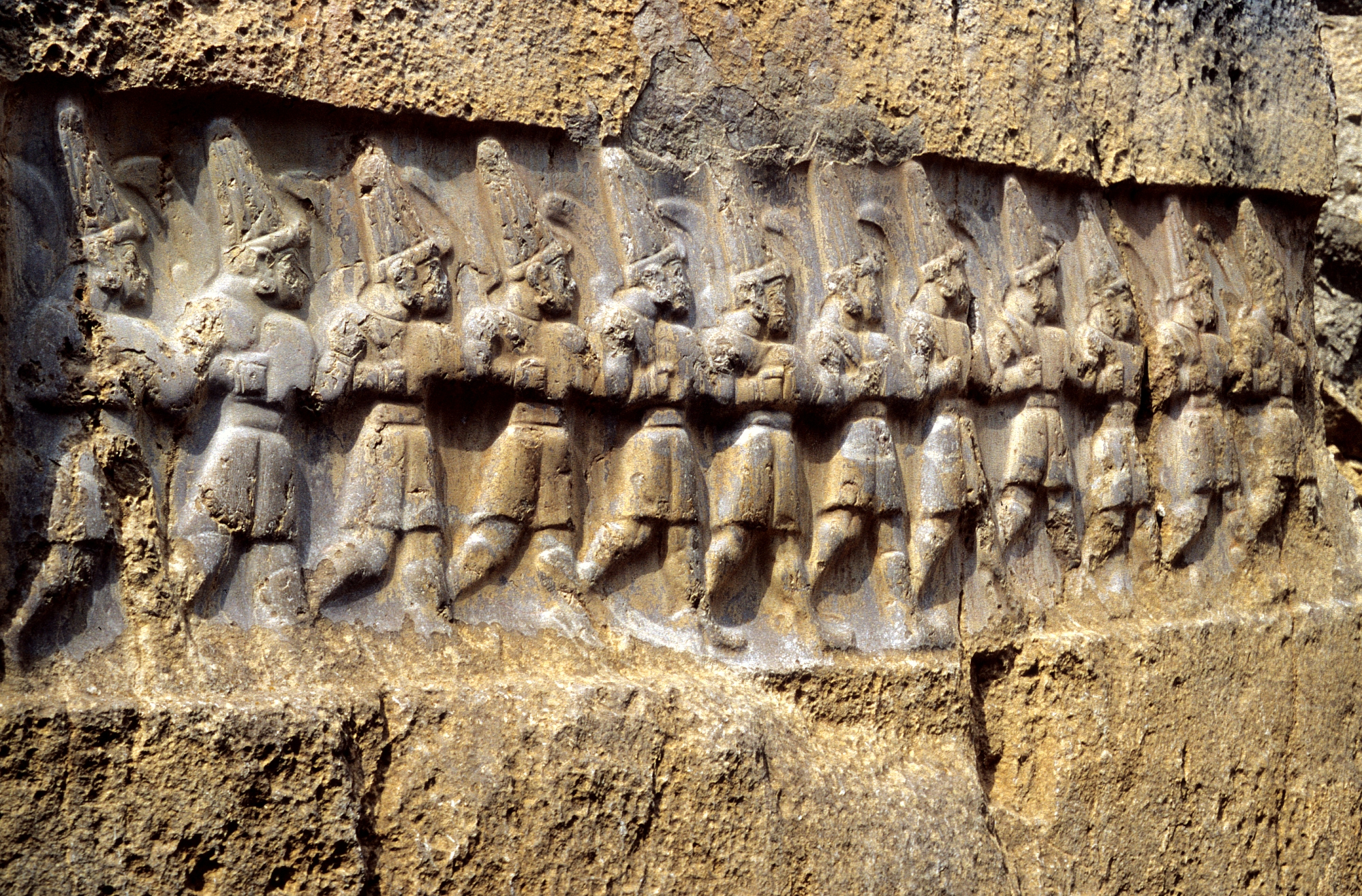
Chamber B relief with the twelve gods of the underworld
