= Gary Beckman =

Hittitologist (born 1948)

Gary Michael Beckman (born 1948) is a noted Hittitologist and Professor of Hittite and Mesopotamian Studies at the University of Michigan. He has written several books on the Hittites: his publication Hittite Diplomatic Texts and Hittite Myths were both republished twice—in 1991 and 1999 respectively. As a Hittitologist, Professor Gary Beckman also wrote an article on Hittite Chronology in Akkadica 119-120 (2000) while he served as an editor of the 2003 book Hittite Studies in Honor of Harry A. Hoffner, Jr: On the Occasion of His 65th Birthday. Beckman also composed a book review of Trevor Bryce's influential book, The Kingdom of the Hittites in the Bryn Mawr Classical Review.

Dr. Beckman participated as an academic advisor for the 2003 Tolga Örnek film "Hititler" (or "Hittites" in English) which discussed the history and culture of the Hittites. In 2008, Professor Beckman reviewed a book concerning "regime change" and their impact upon local societies in the Middle East from ancient times to the modern era. He observed that cultural and administrative changes did not typically happen until approximately two generations (or 50 years) had passed from the overthrow of the previous ruling regime.

== Works ==
- Texts from the Vicinity of Emar in the Collection of Jonathan Rosen, (Padova: Sargon, 1996).
- Catalogue of the Babylonian Collections at Yale. II. Old Babylonian Archival Texts in the Nies Babylonian Collection. (Bethesda, MD: CDL Press, 1995).
- Hittite Diplomatic Texts. Writings from the Ancient World, Volume 7. (Atlanta, GA: Scholars Press, 1996) [second Edition, 1999].
- The Epic of Gilgamesh (Norton Critical Editions), with Benjamin R. Foster and Douglas Frayne (New York: W. W. Norton, 2001).
- Catalogue of the Babylonian Collections at Yale. 4.Old Babylonian Archival Texts in the Yale Babylonian Collection (Bethesda, MD: CDL Press, 2000).
- Hittite Myths, (co-editor), Scholars Press; 2nd edition (1991)
- A Hittite Ritual for Depression (CTV 432) PDF 2007
- The Hittites Make Peace PDF Univ. of Michigan Library, 2014
- Chapter 5 Hittite Literature by Gary Beckman PDF in "From an Antique Land: An Introduction To Ancient Near Eastern Literature" (ed: Carl S. Ehrlich), Rowman & Littlefield Publishers, Inc. 2009
- The Ahhiyawa Texts published by the Society of Biblical Literature in 2011

== See also ==
- History of the Hittites
