= Kizzuwatna =

Ancient Anatolian kingdom

Coordinates: 38°N 36°E

Kizzuwatna (Hittite: 𒆳𒌷𒆠𒄑𒍪𒉿𒀜𒈾) was an ancient Anatolian kingdom attested in written sources from the end of the 16th century BC onwards. Although its origins remain obscure, the Middle Bronze Age in Cilicia (ca. 2000–1550 BC) may be regarded as its possible formative period. Kizzuwatna was situated primarily in the Cilician Plain of southeastern Anatolia, near the Gulf of Alexandretta, now in Turkey. It was bounded by the Central Taurus Mountains and the Nur Mountains. The centre of the kingdom was the city of Kummanni, located in the highlands.

== Etymology ==
The name is said to be a Luwic transliteration (kez-watni) of the Nešili kez-udne, meaning "a country on this side (of the mountains)." Puhvel alternately translates it from the nešili kez wetenezI, with the stem meaning "sea." It has been suggested that kez was an exonym used by the Hittites for a yet-to-be-determined ethnic group.

== Geography ==
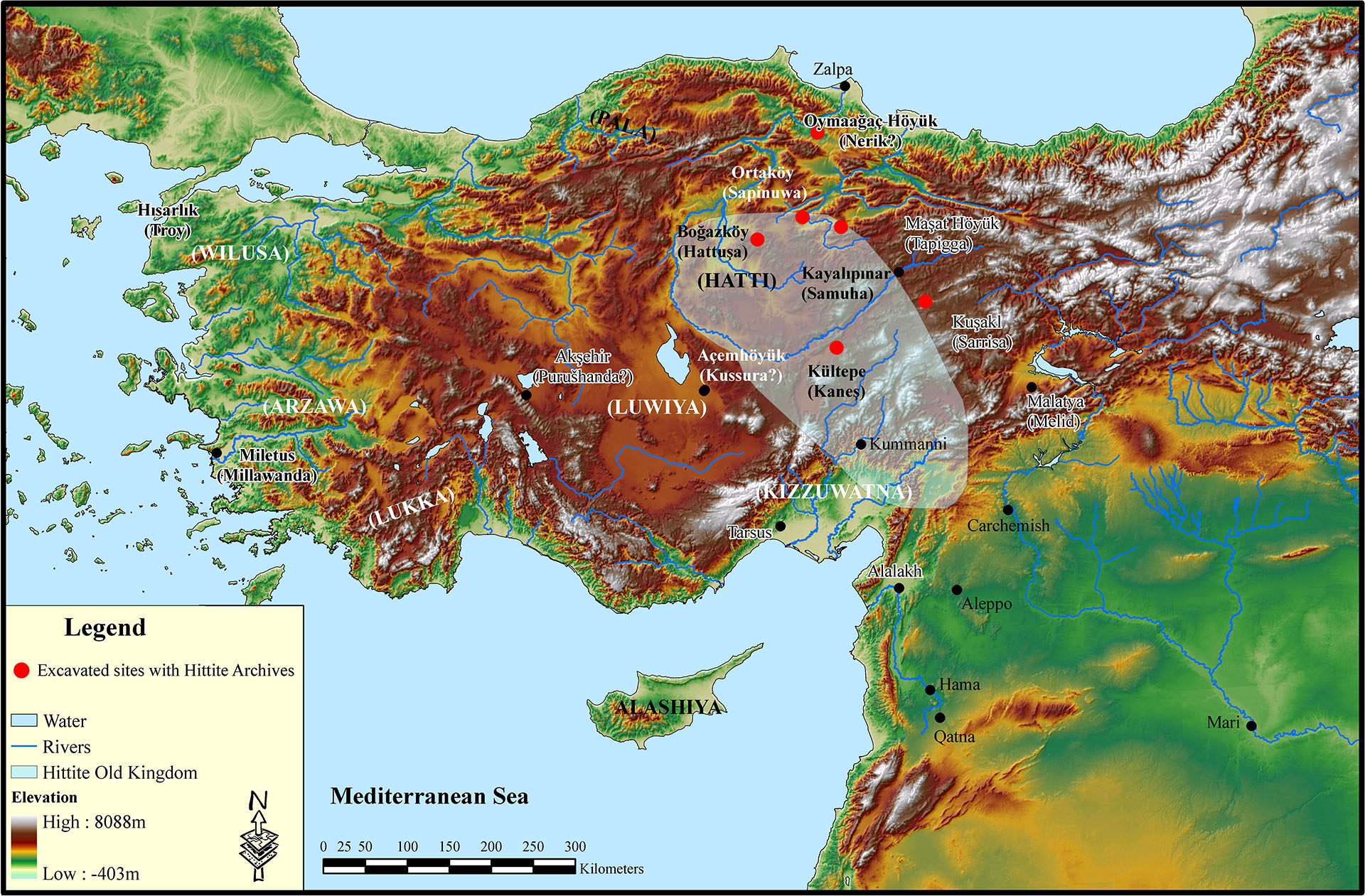
Late Bronze Age regions of Anatolia/Asia Minor (circa 1400 BC)

Kizzuwatna is associated with the Cilician plain in Hittite, Mittani, Egyptian, and Alalakh sources, the borders of which were "defined by the Taurus Mountains to the northwest and north, the Amanus Range to the east, and the Mediterranean Sea, with the Gulf of Iskenderun and the Gulf of Mersin to the south." Its westward extent remains the subject of debate.

== Land ==
The country possessed valuable resources, such as silver mines in the Taurus Mountains. The slopes of the mountain range remain partly wooded. Annual winter rains made agriculture possible in the area at an early date (see Çatalhöyük). The plains along the lower course of the Ceyhan River provided rich cultivated fields.

== People ==
Several ethnic groups coexisted in Kizzuwatna, and its culture represents a fusion of Hurrian, Luwian, and Hittite elements. The pre-Indo-European Hurrians predate the Luwians in the area, and the Hittites probably arrived as part of the imperial expansion under Hattusili I and Mursili I. During the era of the Kingdom of Kizzuwatna, the primary local language was a distinctive Hurrian-influenced dialect of Luwian. However, its first king, Išputahšu, had a Hittite-derived name, and the toponym "Kizzuwatna" itself has been suggested to be a Luwianization of Hittite *kez-udne, meaning "land on this side" in relation to the mountains. Though Kizzuwatna Luwian differs from Empire Luwian spoken in the Hittite heartland, incantations written in Kizzuwatna Luwian appear untranslated in Hittite ritual texts. Hurrian culture became more prominent in Kizzuwatna once it entered the sphere of influence of the Hurrian kingdom of Mitanni.

Puduhepa, queen of the Hittite king Hattusili III, came from Kizzuwatna, where she had been a priestess. Its pantheon was also integrated into the Hittite one, and the goddess Hebat of Kizzuwatna became very important in Hittite religion towards the end of the 13th century BC.

== History ==
Excavations of Sirkeli Höyük establish occupation as early as 2420 BC, with an extensive settlement comprising both a central mound and a lower town existing from at least the 1600s BC, abandoned in the 1400s BC, and not resettled until after the Late Bronze Age collapse. This suggests the existence of a polity located at the southern end of both a "Great Caravan Route" that connected the Cilician plain with the Troad during the Early Bronze Age and an overland trade route from the Hittite Lower Land to Ebla, Alalakh, and Carchemish during the Middle Bronze Age.

King Sargon of Akkad claimed to have reached the Taurus Mountains (the "silver mountains") in the 23rd century BC; however, archaeology has yet to confirm any Akkadian influence in the area. The trade routes from Assyria to the karum in the Anatolian highlands passed through Kizzuwatna by the early 2nd millennium BC.

The first mentions of the kingdom of Kizzuwatna under the name Adaniya appear at the end of the 16th century BC in diplomatic documents of the Hittite kingdom, in the Edict of Telipinu, concerning political problems in the region. One of the earliest direct sources mentioning the name Kizzuwatna is a cretula from Tarsus stamped with the seal of King Išpudaḫšu. The seal’s short inscription also mentions the name of his father, Pariyawatri, which raises the question of whether Pariyawatri was king.

From the end of the 16th century BC onwards, the kings of Kizzuwatna maintained frequent contact with the Hittites to the north. The earliest Hittite records seem to refer to Kizzuwatna (as Adaniya), along with Arzawa in western Anatolia, as Luwia.

In the power struggle between the Anatolian Hittite kingdom and the northern Mesopotamian Hurrian kingdom of Mitanni in the 15th and early 14th centuries BC, Kizzuwatna became a strategic partner owing to its location. Isputahsu concluded a treaty with the Hittite king Telepinu. Later, Kizzuwatna shifted its allegiance, perhaps because of a new ruling dynasty. The city-state of Alalakh to the south expanded under its energetic leader Idrimi, himself a subject of the Mitannian king Barattarna. King Pilliya of Kizzuwatna was obliged to sign a treaty with Idrimi concerning the exchange of fugitives between Idrimi and Pilliya.

Pilliya also made peace with the Hittite king Zidanta II, signing a parity treaty.

On Kizzuwatna's north-eastern border, the state of Ishuwa also existed during this period and played a political role in the rivalry between the Hittites and the Mitanni.

At the time of Kizzuwatna king Sunassura (Shunashura), the Hittite king Tudhaliya I became more powerful. He concluded a treaty with Sunassura and removed Kizzuwatna from Mitannian domination.

His adopted son, King Arnuwanda I, likely continued his father's policy. The exceedingly rough and unfavourable terrain of the Tarsus Mountains made it likely that, to remain prominent among their Hurrian- and Luwian-speaking neighbours, the Kizzuwatna requested favourable terms in treaties and were subsequently granted them.

Kizzuwatna rebelled during the reign of Suppiluliuma I but remained within the Hittite Empire for 200 years. In the famous Battle of Kadesh (c. 1274 BC), Kizzuwatna supplied troops to the Hittite king. As master equestrians—among the first in the areas south of the Caucasus—they provided horses that were later favoured by King Solomon and enabled more aggressive use of the Hittite chariot than their Egyptian and Assyrian rivals achieved.

The Kizzuwatna were master craftsmen, mining experts, and blacksmiths, noted for being among the first to work "black iron," understood to have been meteoric iron, into weapons such as maces, swords, and spearheads. Their location in the mineral-rich Tarsus Range provided ample materials for their industry.

Around 1200 BC, an invasion by the Sea Peoples is believed to have temporarily displaced the inhabitants of the Cilician plain, but many among the Sea Peoples' entourage were likely Luwian and Hurrian, possibly to ensure that they retained a stake in how the invasions affected their communities rather than being merely victims.

After the fall of the Hittite Empire, the Neo-Hittite kingdom Quwe, or Hiyawa, emerged in the former territory of Kizzuwatna.

== Kings and kingdoms ==
Chronology of kings and kingdoms as per Trameri (2020).

Hatti	Kizzuwatna	Alalah	Mittani	Egypt
	(Pariyawatri)			
Telipinu	Išpudaḫšu			
Taḫurwaili	Eḫeya		Šuttarna/Saitarna	
?	Paddatiššu			Thutmosis III
Zidanza II	Pilliya	Idrimi	Parsatatar/ Baratarna	
Tudḫaliya I	Sunaššura	Niqmepa	Sauštatar	Thutmosis III
		Ilimilimma	Artadama I	Amenhotep II
	Kantuzili (the priest)		Šuttarna II	Thutmosis IV
Suppiluliuma I	Telipinu (the priest)		Tušratta	Amenhotep III/IV

== See also ==
- Ancient regions of Anatolia
- Cilicia
- Neo-Hittites

== Sources ==
- Beckman, Garry M.: Hittite Diplomatic Texts, Scholars Press, Atlanta 1996.
- Götze, Albrecht: Kizzuwatna and the problem of Hittite geography, Yale university press, New Haven 1940.
- Haas, Volkert: Hurritische und luwische Riten aus Kizzuwatna, Butzon & Bercker, Kevelaer 1974.
- Yakubovich, Ilya: Sociolinguistics of the Luvian Language, Brill, Leiden 2010.
- Novák, Mirko: Kizzuwatna, Ḥiyawa, Quwe – Ein Abriss der Kulturgeschichte des Ebenen Kilikien, in J. Becker, R. Hempelmann, E. Rehm (ed.), Kulturlandschaft Syrien – Zentrum und Peripherie.Festschrift für Jan-Waalke Meyer, Alter Orient und Altes Testament 371, Ugarit-Verlag, Münster 2010, pp. 397–425
- Forlanini, Massimo: How to infer Ancient Roads and Intineraries from heterogenous Hittite Texts: The Case of the Cilician (Kizzuwatnean) Road System, KASKAL 10, 2013, pp. 1–34.
- Novák, Mirko and Rutishauser, Susanne: Tutḫaliya, Šunaššura und die Grenze zwischen Ḫatti und Kizzuwatna, in: C. Mittermayer, S. Ecklin (eds.), Altorientalische Studien zu Ehren von Pascal Attinger, Orbis Biblicus et Orientalis 256, Academic Press, Fribourg/Göttingen 2012, pp. 259–269.
- Kozal, Ekin and Novák, Mirko: Facing Muwattalli. Some Thoughts on the Visibility and Function of the Rock Reliefs at Sirkeli Höyük, Cilicia, in: E. Kozal, M. Akar, Y. Heffron, Ç. Çilingiroğlu, T.E. Şerifoğlu, C. Çakırlar, S. Ünlüsoy and E. Jean (eds.), Questions, Approaches, and Dialoguesin the Eastern Mediterranean Archaeology Studies in Honor of Marie-Henriette and Charles Gates, Alter Orient und Altes Testament 445, Ugarit-Verlag, Münster 2017, pp. 371–388.
- Kryszeń, Adam (2023). "Kizzuwatna". Hittite Toponyms. University of Mainz; University of Würzburg.
- Novák, Mirko and Rutishauser, Susanne: Kizzuwatna: Archaeology. In: M. Weeden und L.Z. Ullmann (ed.), Hittite Landscape and Geography. Handbuch der Orientalistik I,121, Brill, Leiden 2017, pp. 134–145.
- Kozal, Ekin and Novák, Mirko: Alalakh and Kizzuwatna. Some Thoughts on the Synchronization, in: Ç. Maner, A. Gilbert, M. Horowitz (ed.), Overturning Certainties in Near Eastern Archaeology, A Festschrift in Honor of K. Aslıhan Yener for her 40 years of Field Archaeology in the Eastern Mediterranean, Brill, Leiden 2017, pp. 296–317.
