= Šimige =

Hurrian sun god

- Hurrian sun god
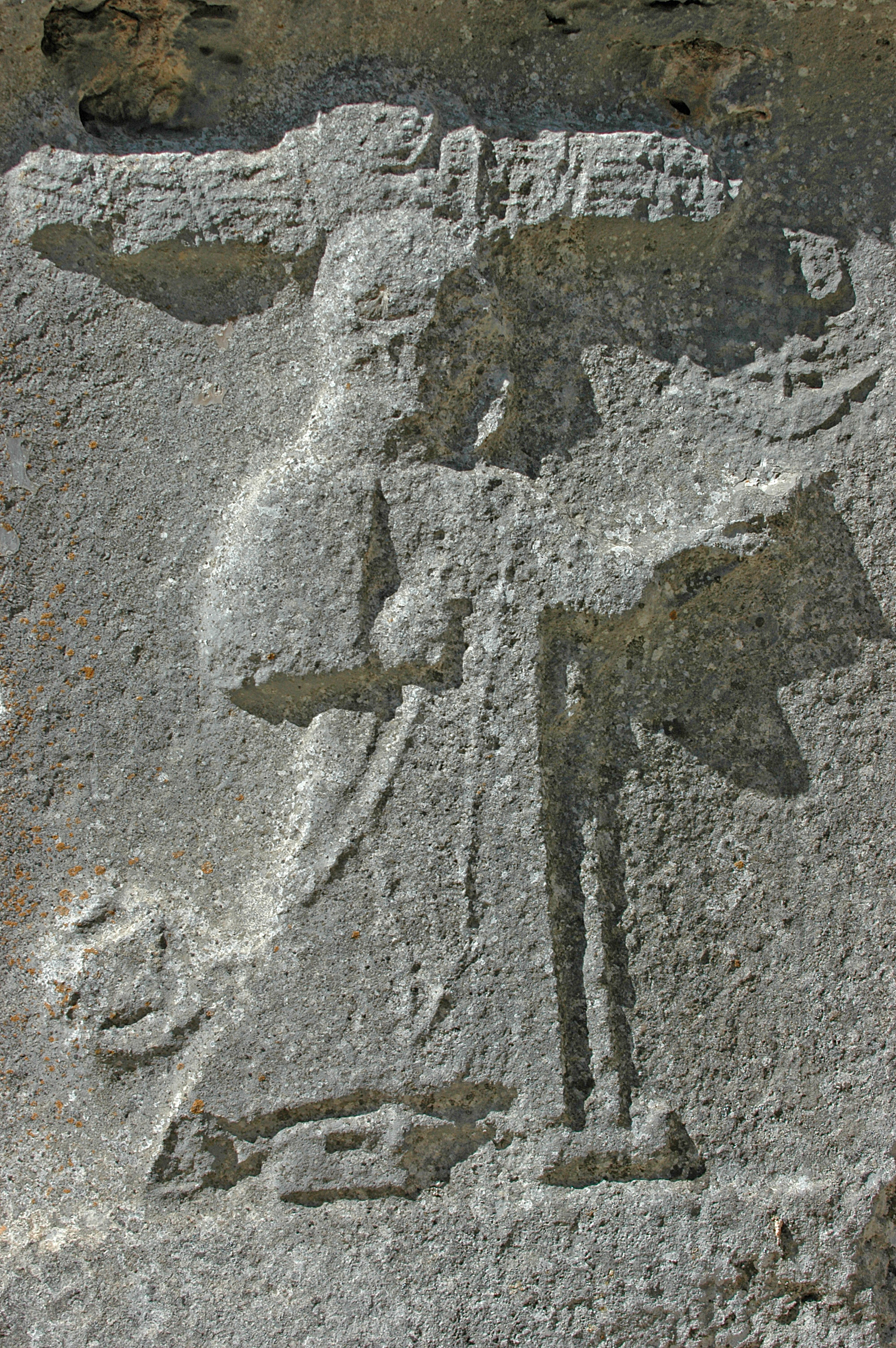
- Relief 34 from the Yazılıkaya sanctuary, assumed to be a depiction of Šimige

Genealogy
- Consort: Ayu-Ikalti
- Children: seven daughters

Equivalents
- Mesopotamian: Shamash
- Ugaritic: Shapash
- Hittite: Sun god of Heaven
- Luwian: Tiwaz

Šimige (also spelled Šimegi, Šimigi) was the Hurrian sun god. Known sources do not associate him with any specific location, but he is attested in documents from various settlements inhabited by the Hurrians, from Kizzuwatnean cities in modern Turkey, through Ugarit, Alalakh and Mari in Syria, to Nuzi, in antiquity a part of the kingdom of Arrapḫa in northeastern Iraq. His character was to a large degree based on his Mesopotamian counterpart Shamash, though they were not identical. Šimige was in turn an influence on the Hittite Sun god of Heaven and Luwian Tiwaz.

In Hurrian myths, Šimige is portrayed as one of the allies of Teshub. He plays an active role in the Song of Ullikummi, where he is the first to spot the eponymous monster, and as a result brings the news about his existence to the weather god.

== Name and character ==
Šimige was a sun god. He was believed to travel through the sky in a chariot drawn by four horses, accompanied by his servants. He was also associated with oracles.

It is agreed that Šimige's name means "sun" in Hurrian, but more detailed etymological and morphological analysis is not possible yet. The orthography of the name varies between sources. Examples of its cuneiform writings include ši-mi-i-ge in the so-called "Mitanni letter," ši-mi-ge-e in incantations from Mari, and ši-mi-ga or ši-mi-ka in theophoric names from various sites, from Alalakh in the west to Arrapḫa in the east. Gernot Wilhelm suggests that forms ending in -e might be western, while these ending with an -a - eastern. In the Ugaritic alphabetic script the name was rendered as ṯmg.

As early as in the inscription of early Hurrian king Atalshen, Šimige's name could also be represented by the Sumerian logogram ^{d}UTU. In some cases, for example in texts from Hattusa, it is difficult to tell which solar deity is meant due to this writing being used to represent multiple names. Similarly, it is not certain which solar deity or deities are represented by the logogram ^{d}UTU in documents from Emar, with Hurrian, Mesopotamian, Hittite and local ones all being considered plausible options by Gary Beckman. Eduardo Torrecilla notes that in the Middle Euphrates area syllabic writings of the name of a locally worshiped sun god, Shamash, are uncommon, and therefore the logogram is likely to designate him, but also that Šimige cannot be ruled out as an option in some cases, for example in a theophoric name attested in a document from Azû (Tell Hadidi).

It is possible that syllabic spelling of Šimige's name could be used to designate other solar deities in Hurrian documents in a similar manner. It has been argued that in the Mitanni letter it refers to Egyptian Ra. However, this conclusion is not universally accepted, and it is sometimes assumed that the sun understood as a celestial body is meant, rather than any deity.

== Associations with other deities ==
Šimige was closely associated with the Mesopotamian sun god, Shamash (Sumerian: Utu). It is commonly assumed that the character of the Hurrian god and his position in the pantheon were patterned after his Mesopotamian counterpart. However, while very similar, they were not entirely identical; for example, Šimige does not show any associations with the underworld. In a single Hurrian incantation from Hattusa Sippar, the cult center of Shamash, is mentioned in association with Šimige. The trilingual edition of the Weidner god list from Ugarit equates him not only with Utu, but also with Lugalbanda, possibly because the Hurrian pantheon had fewer deities than the Mesopotamian one, creating the need to treat the same Hurrian deity as an equivalent of multiple Mesopotamian ones in scholarly texts.

References to "gods of the father of Šimige", his divine ancestors, are known from various Hurrian documents. Similar figures are also attested in relation to other major Hurrian deities, for example Šauška and Ḫepat. Unusually, in one case "gods of the father of Šimige" are collectively qualified as male.

The wife of Shamash, Aya, was incorporated into Hurrian mythology as the wife of Šimige. The Hurrian form of her name was Ayu-Ikalti. According to Alfonso Archi, its second part was most likely derived from the common epithet of this goddess, kallatu, designating her as the spouse of the sun god. The relation between them is attested in texts from Ugarit and Hattusa. It has been argued that Aya was incorporated into the Hurrian pantheon only for the sake of theological consistency. Her role is sometimes compared and contrasted with that of Nikkal, a similar derivative of Mesopotamian Ningal, who apparently held a higher position in the Hurrian pantheon despite also originating as a direct adaptation of a Mesopotamian deity regarded as a spouse of a specific god.

Hurrian incantations from Old Babylonian Mari state that Šimige was believed to have seven daughters. Echoes of this tradition are also present in Hittite texts pertaining to him. It is possible that these goddesses functioned as divine midwives.

Šimige had his own sukkal (divine attendant) known under the name Lipparuma or Lipparu. According to Piotr Taracha he was regarded as analogous to Bunene, the sukkal of Shamash. In a bilingual Sumero-Hurrian version of the Weidner god list from Emar Šimige's sukkal is instead Bunene, transcribed in the Hurrian column as ^{d}wu-u-un-ni-nu-wa-an. According to Volkert Haas, Lipparuma and Bunene coexisted in this role. Mišaru, another courtier of Shamash, is attested in relation to the Hurrian sun god too. Haas also described the Ilaliyant deities as members to his court according to Hittite sources, but Piotr Taracha instead concludes that they were associated with the Luwian sun god, Tiwaz.

The trilingual edition of the Weidner god list from Ugarit attests that Šimige and the local solar goddess Shapash were considered equivalents of each other. Due to the latter being female, the compilers of the list, seemingly to avoid the implications that she had a wife, treated the name of Aya present in the first column as a rare spelling of Ea, who was then equated with his Hurrian form Eyan and with the local craftsman god Kothar. For this reason, Ayu-Ikalti is absent from this document. The perception of Šimige and Shapash as analogous might additionally explain why a letter sent by the Hittite viceroy, who resided in Carchemish, to king Niqmaddu of Ugarit mentions a deity referred to as "lady Šimige" (NIN-ka ši-mi-ga) despite Šimige being otherwise regarded as a masculine deity.

A degree of syncretism most likely occurred between Šimige and various solar deities worshiped by the Hittites. Piotr Taracha goes as far as assuming Šimige and the Sun god of Heaven were outright the same deity. The character of the Luwian sun god, Tiwaz, was influenced by Šimige as well. In a single case, in an itkalizi ritual, the Sun goddess of Arinna appears in place of Šimige alongside his wife Ayu-Ikalti. However, another of the Anatolian solar deities, the Sun goddess of the Earth, was not considered analogous to Šimige, but rather to Allani, the Hurrian goddess of the underworld, who had no solar characteristics herself.

The name of the god Šiwini, worshiped in Urartu, might be a cognate of Šimige's. This theory is considered more plausible than the alternate proposal that it is etymologically related to Hittite šiu(na), "god," or šiwatt, "day," and by extension less directly with the Proto-Indo-European root *diēu-. However, Gernot Wilhelm notes that there is no indication that Hurrian and Urartian religions were similar, and the connections between them appear to be entirely linguistic. Šiwini might have been associated with the Urartian city Tušpa (Van Kalesi), as indicated by the name of his spouse, the goddess Tušpuea.

== Worship ==
Šimige is considered one of the "pan-Hurrian" gods, similar to Teshub, Šauška, Kušuḫ, Kumarbi or Nupatik. There is no indication in known sources that any specific location was strongly associated with him, but he is attested in documents from many Hurrian cities, including Urkesh, Tigunani, Alalakh, Nuzi, Arrapḫa, Tell al-Rimah and Chagar Bazar, for example in numerous theophoric names. Examples include Eḫlip-Šimika ("Šimige saves") and Arip-Šimika ("Šimige gave [a child]").

The oldest known attestation of Šimige comes from an inscription of the king of Urkesh, Tish-atal, where the sun god appears between Belet Nagar and Teshub. It has been dated to the second half of the third millennium BCE. He is also well represented in Hurrian incantations from Old Babylonian Mari. Additionally, a single text from this city mentions that Šimige bestowed kingship upon Yahdun-Lim.

Šimige held a particularly high position in Alalakh, where he headed the local pantheon alongside Išḫara and Teshub. In the state pantheon of Mitanni, he was one of the most important deities next to Teshub, Šauška and "Ea-šarri." He is invoked as one of the divine witnesses in the treaty between Šattiwaza and Šuppiluliuma I, where he appears alongside Kušuḫ. References to a solar deity in texts from Nuzi, documenting the religion of the kingdom of Arrapḫa, are assumed to be evidence of the worship of Šimige as well. One of them directly mentions that one of the gates of the city of Arrapḫa was regarded as "belonging to Šimige" (abullu Šimikuḫḫe). Additionally, a ḫumṭum festival dedicated to a sun god and a weather god, conventionally identified as Mesopotamian Shamash and Adad, which according to an inscription of Shamshi-Adad I took place there, might have been connected with the cult of Šimige and Teshub. The sun god of the city of Azuḫinnu, located near Arrapḫa, is also assumed to be Šimige. In another Hurrian kingdom, Kizzuwatna, he was worshiped in Lawazantiya.

Hurrian texts from Ugarit attest the worship of Šimige too. In one of the offering lists, he appears between Anat, a local goddess apparently incorporated into the Hurrian pantheon, and Nikkal. In another, a part of a mixed Ugaritic-Hurrian ritual dedicated to the goddess Ashtart, he is placed between Anat and the mountain god Pišaišapḫi. He also appears in nine theophoric names from this city.

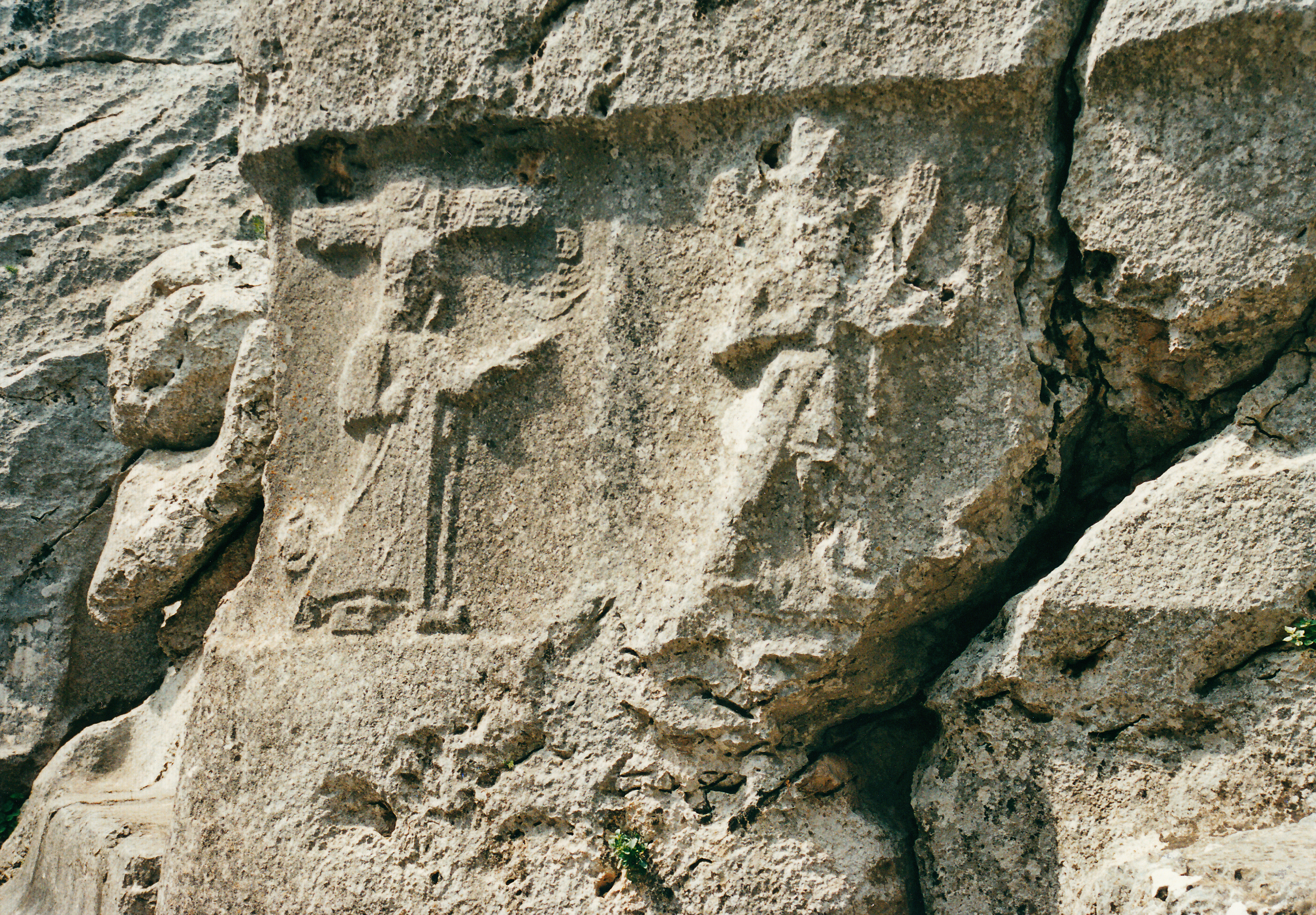
Šimige and Kušuḫ in Yazılıkaya.

Šimige was also incorporated into the Hittite pantheon in the Middle Hittite period. He is well attested in documents from Hattusa dealing with the worship of Hurrian deities. He is also among the deities depicted in the Yazılıkaya sanctuary. A winged sun symbol is placed above his head, while his robes according to Piotr Taracha resemble those worn by Hittite kings while they fulfilled their priestly duties. He is placed in the procession of deities following Teshub, between Kušuḫ and Astabi. In offering lists, he similarly appears among the deities belonging to the circle of the weather god.

== Mythology ==
In myths, Šimige often appears as one of the allies of Teshub. However, he is relatively sparsely attested in such texts, and his individual character remains poorly known.

In the Song of Silver, one of the myths belonging to the Cycle of Kumarbi, the eponymous antagonist, a half-human son of Kumarbi, at one point brings the sun and moon gods down from heaven and threatens them. They plead to let them go, because without them Silver, who apparently temporarily became the king of gods, will have to reign in darkness. The rest of the narrative is not preserved.

Šimige also appears in the Song of Ullikummi. He is first mentioned by Kumarbi while he plans where to hide the eponymous monster to make sure none of his enemies will see him while he is still growing. Later Šimige is the first among Teshub's allies to spot Ullikummi, and instantly arrives to share this information with him. The weather god's brother Tašmišu remarks that it is unusual for the sun god to appear at such a time, and that the news he brings must be horrible. Teshub nonetheless says a seat and a meal should be prepared for Šimige, who protests, to which the host reacts in confusion, assuming that he feels offended for some reason. The next fragment is not preserved, but it is presumed that it was the continuation of a "stereotypical scene of a messenger arriving with a message so urgent that he refuses to eat before delivering it." After telling Teshub what happened, Šimige is reassured by his friend that it is fine to sit down and enjoy the prepared food and drink. Later he returns to his journey through the sky. Mario Giorgieri points out that the Hittite translation refers to Šimige with the epithet nepišaš, "of heaven," which finds no parallel in Hurrian tradition, but is well attested as a descriptor of his Hittite counterpart, the Sun god of Heaven. However, Volkert Haas noted that similar epithets of sun gods already functioned earlier in Mari and in Old Assyrian treaties.

According to Gary Beckman, while the surviving fragments of the Hurrian adaptation of the Epic of Gilgamesh are very difficult to translate, it can be established with certainty that Šimige appears in a single passage, explicitly under his Hurrian name, spelled phonetically as ^{d}ši-mi-i-ga. The same fragment mentions Teshub of Kummanni (^{d}u-ub ^{uru}kum-mi-ni-we), whose Mesopotamian counterpart plays no major role in the original text.

Nicolas Wyatt's suggestion that the god ḫrḫb (Ḫiriḫibi) known from the Ugaritic myth Marriage of Nikkal and Yarikh corresponds to Šimige is not regarded as plausible.
