= Nikkal =

Hurrian and Ugaritic goddess

- Spouse of the moon god
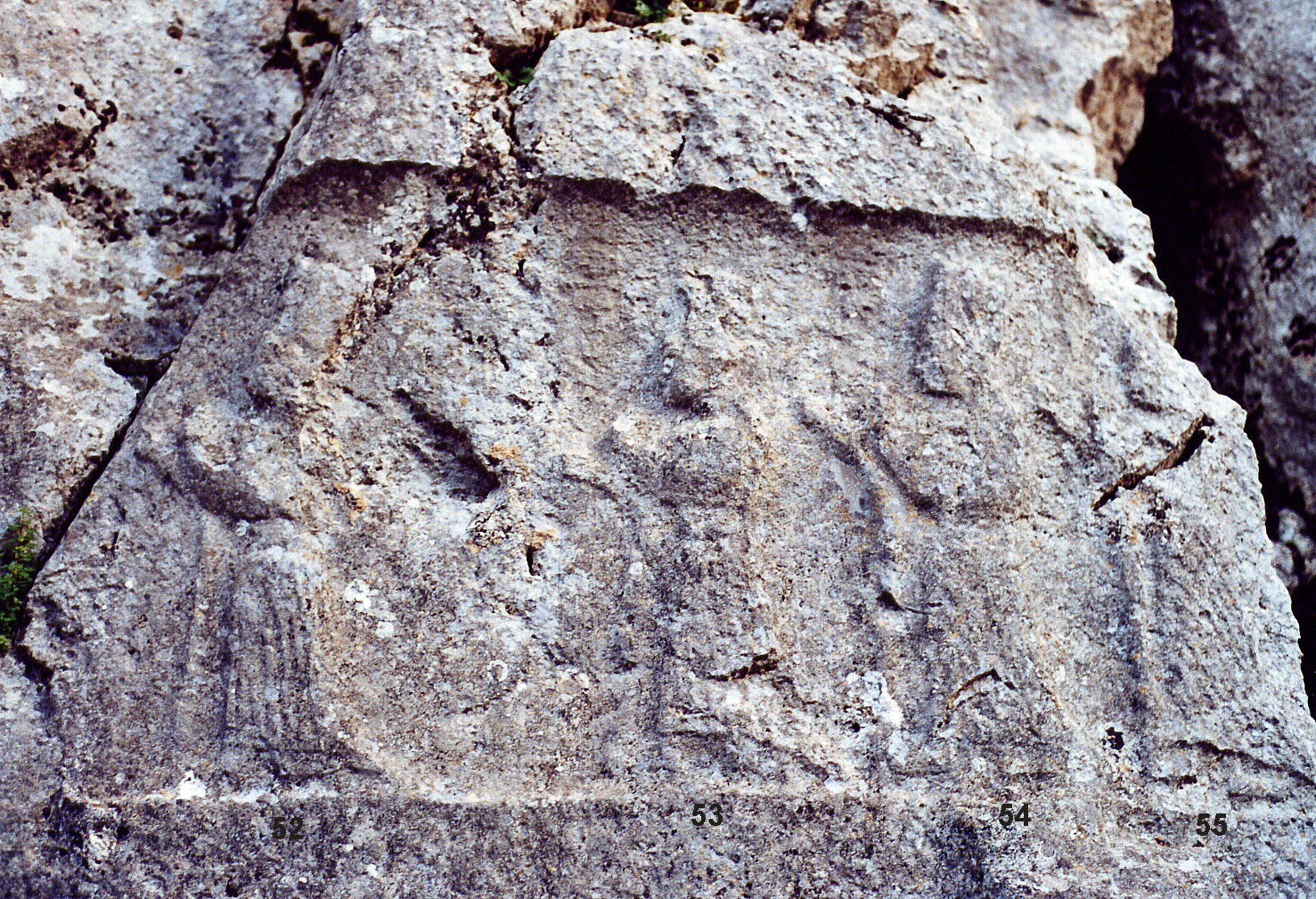
- Nikkal (second from the left) on the Yazılıkaya procession relief
- Other names: Nikkal-wa-Ib
- Major cult center: Ugarit

Genealogy
- Parents: possibly ḫrḫb (Ḫiriḫibi) (father)
- Spouse: Kušuḫ/Umbu (in Hurro-Hittite sources); Yarikh (in Ugarit)
- Children: Sun god of Heaven (in Hittite sources)

Equivalents
- Mesopotamian: Ningal

Nikkal (logographically ^{d}NIN.GAL, alphabetically 𐎐𐎋𐎍 nkl) or Nikkal-wa-Ib (nkl wib) was a goddess worshiped in various areas of the ancient Near East west of Mesopotamia. She was derived from the Mesopotamian goddess Ningal, and like her forerunner was regarded as the spouse of a moon god, whose precise identity varied between locations. While well attested in Hurrian and Hittite sources, as well as in Ugarit, she is largely absent from documents from the western part of ancient Syria.

== Name and character ==
Nikkal was derived from the Mesopotamian goddess Ningal (Sumerian: "great lady"), wife of the moon god Nanna. Similarly to deities such as Ea, Damkina, Aya or Pinikir she was introduced from Mesopotamia to Hurrian areas possibly as early as in the third millennium BCE. Alfonso Archi assumes that the presence of Ningal in the pantheon of the kingdom of Mari in particular was in part responsible for her adoption by the Hurrians and her later prominence in their religion. He stresses that Ningal was already known in the west in the Ur III period.

In Hittite sources Nikkal's name was usually spelled logographically as ^{d}NIN.GAL, though phonetic syllabic spellings such as ^{d}Ni-ik-kal are also known, while in Hurrian texts the latter predominate. An additional form of the name, Nikkal-wa-Ib ("Nikkal and Ib"), is known from Ugarit. It is commonly accepted that the second element means "fruit" in Ugaritic and that it is analogous to a similar epithet of the Mesopotamian Nanna, ^{d}In-bi, "the fruit". However, restorations of Ugaritic texts including the phrase ilat inbi, "goddess of fruit," are now regarded as erroneous and there is no evidence that such an epithet was ever applied to Nikkal independently from the name Nikkal-wa-Ib. An alternate interpretation associates Ib with Umbu, a name of the moon god in Hurrian sources which possibly originated in Upper Mesopotamia. However, according to Mauro Giorgieri connecting this epithet with the Umbu, or treating the latter as an epithet of Nikkal, is problematic. He concludes that instances where the name Umbu precedes Nikkal should be treated as references to a dyad of deities, the former being the name of the Hurrian moon god in this context. The etymology of this theonym ultimately remains uncertain.

Due to Nikkal's infrequent appearances in mythological texts, discussion of her character is regarded as largely speculative. In Hittite tradition she could function as one of the deities linked to oaths alongside Išḫara and the moon god. (Note: The sumerogram denoting this deity, ^{d}EN.ZU or ^{d}XXX, typically refers to Arma in Hittite sources, with Hattian Kašku being a figure of minor importance.) However, such attestations are not common.

== Association with other deities ==
The notion of Ningal being the wife of the moon god was retained by cultures who adopted her into their pantheons as Nikkal. Hurrian texts feature Nikkal paired with the moon god under both of his names, Kušuḫ and Umbu. The dyad Umbu-Nikkal is first attested in the fifteenth century BCE. Piotr Taracha notes that it can be considered an example of a broader phenomenon of worship of dyads of deities in Hurrian religion, and compares this case to the pairing of deities such as Ḫepat and Šarruma, Ninatta and Kulitta, Hutena and Hutellura, Išḫara and Allani or two hypostases of Nupatik in cultic context due to their similar characteristics. In Ugarit Nikkal is attested alongside Kušuḫ, but she was also regarded as the spouse of local moon god Yarikh.

Maḫitti (singular) or Maḫittena (plural) are attested as members of Nikkal's circle in a Hurro-Hittite context. Volkert Haas suggested that they were divine prophetesses, and interpreted their name as an Akkadian loanword in Hurrian based on the similarity to the terms maḫḫitu and maḫḫutu(m) attested in the Mari texts. A ritual attributed to queen Nikkal-mati lists various further deities who belonged to the circle of Nikkal, including Zēdu (possibly her divine handmaiden), Alwil, Agaššari, the "gods of the father" of Nikkal, (Note: enna(-ša) attani-we-na(-ša)'; the concept of ancestral deities was most likely derived from Mesopotamian theology, in which figures such as ancestors of Enlil developed; in Hurrian sources divine ancestors of deities such as Teshub, Ḫepat, Šauška, Lelluri and Šimige are also mentioned.) as well as other groups of deities not provided with individual names (širini, ḫawari and gate) divine hounds and piglets.

The Hittite text known as "prayer of Kantuzzili" refers to Ištanu (the "Sun god of Heaven") as Nikkal's son.

It has been proposed that a god known only from the Ugaritic myth Marriage of Nikkal and Yarikh, ḫrḫb, might be Nikkal's father. However, modern restorations of the text indicate explicit references to such a relation are lacking. He is referred to with two epithets, with the first being agreed to mean "king of summer" or "king of the summer fruit," while the meaning of the second is regarded as connected to the institution of marriage (proposals include "king of weddings," "king of the wedding season" and "king of marriage"). In the past interpretations such as "king of the raiding season" were also proposed. He is assumed to be a deity of Hurrian origin, and it is possible that his name might mean "he of the mountain Ḫiriḫ(i)", and end with the suffix -bi (Ḫiriḫ(i)bi). This type of divine name would be similar to these of Hurrian deities Kumarbi and Nabarbi, meaning respectively "he of Kumme" and "she of Nawar."

== Worship ==
Nikkal had a prominent position in the Hurrian pantheon, and Alfonso Archi highlights that she is the only spouse of a Mesopotamian deity incorporated into the Hurrian pantheon who also appears in Hurrian sources on her own. Areas in which she was worshiped included the Hurrian kingdom of Kizzuwatna, the Hittite Empire and Ugarit. It is assumed that in the latter two areas she was received through Hurrian intermediaries. Volkert Haas attributed her introduction to the Hittite pantheon to queen Nikkal-mati, the wife of Tudḫaliya I. Most Hittite ritual texts which mention Nikkal are assumed to be influenced by the culture of Kizzuwatna. A prayer of Muwatalli II identified her as one of the deities of Kummanni. In Hurro-Hittite sources she appears in the offering lists (kaluti) dedicated to the circle of the goddess Ḫepat. She is also among the deities depicted in the Yazılıkaya sanctuary in a procession of deities compared to lists known from these texts, where she appears between Damkina and Aya. However, in Ankuwa during the reign of Tudḫaliya IV she received offerings as a deity from the kaluti of Teshub instead. A distinct kaluti centered on her is also known. In the Kizzuwatnean ritual of Ammiḫatna Nikkal is among the goddesses mentioned in the context of offerings made to all the female deities (Hurrian: ḫeyarunna aštuḫina). The fragmentary ritual text KUB 51.73 mentions offerings made to Nikkal and her throne.

A number of Hittite theophoric names invoking Nikkal are known, including these of queen Nikkal-mati and her daughter Ashmu-Nikkal. Haas pointed out that etymologically Hurrian theophoric names of queens invoking Nikkal and Ḫepat might point at a connection of the Middle Hittite royal house with southern Anatolia and northern Syria, where both of these goddesses were worshiped. It is possible that Nikkal-mati was the queen who according to a Middle Hittite document presided over a private ritual to Nikkal, in which her two sons, a priest (possibly named Kantuzzili) and Tulpi-Teshub also took part.

=== Ugaritic reception ===
In Ugarit Nikkal is attested in both Ugaritic and Hurrian texts. Some researchers, for example Aicha Rahmouni, refer to her as a Hurrian deity even while discussing Ugaritic sources. According to Gernot Wilhelm and Piotr Taracha the city can be considered a major cult center of Nikkal. The text RS 24.250+ mentions a sanctuary dedicated to her, designated by the term ḫmn. One of the texts from this site preserves a Hurrian hymn dedicated to her, accompanied by musical notation. Its contents were originally published by Emmanuel Laroche alongside other Hurrian texts from Ugarit in 1968, while the first author to propose that the text might represent musical notation was Hans Gustav Güterbock in 1970. Offerings to Nikkal are mentioned in Hurrian context in the text RS 24.254. Another of the ritual texts in which she appears, KTU^{3} 1.111, combines Ugaritic and Hurrian elements and lists offerings to her alongside these to both Kušuḫ and Yarikh. She is also among the deities mentioned in RS 24.261, which similarly combines Ugaritic and Hurrian elements and focuses on Šauška and her counterpart Ashtart. During a ritual which took place during the final month of the Ugaritic lunar calendar, Ra’šu-Yêni ("first wine"), she received a cow as an offering directly after sacrifices to Yarikh.

Multiple theophoric names invoking Nikkal are known from Ugarit as well. Seven individuals bearing them have been identified as of 2016. One of them was Eḫli-Nikkal. She is the only presently known Hittite princess who married into the Ugaritic royal family.

A treaty between Ugarit and Carchemish indicates that Nikkal was also worshiped in two other nearby settlements, Gur'atu and Nubannu, both of which were under the control of the latter kingdom.

=== Miscellaneous attestations ===
Nikkal is not attested in non-Hurrian non-Ugaritic sources from Bronze Age western Syria. According to Gina Konstantopoulos, it is possible that a reference to Nikkal which she compares to the attestations of this goddess from Ugarit might be present in the treaty between Ashur-nirari V of Assyria and Mati-ilu of Arpad from the first millennium BCE, which invokes many western deities, for example Hadad of Aleppo, Karhuha and Kubaba from Carchemish or Melqart and Eshmun from Phoenicia, alongside Assyrian ones.

In Egypt Nikkal is only attested in Leiden Magical Papyrus I dated to the reign of the Twentieth Dynasty of Egypt, in which she appears as a foreign deity implored to heal a specific affliction.

== Mythology ==
Nikkal appears in an Ugaritic text (CAT 1.24) describing the circumstances of her marriage to the moon god, Yarikh. It is assumed that the myth is either a translation of a Hurrian text, or at least an adaptation of motifs pertaining to Nikkal and Kušuḫ in Hurrian mythology. A possible indication that the text's forerunners originated outside Ugarit is also the presence of a reference to Dagan of Tuttul in it. Through the text, Nikkal is referred to as glmt, "young woman." Based on the use of the term in other Ugaritic texts, especially the Epic of king Kirta, it is assumed that it can designate a bride. Yarikh wants to marry Nikkal, but Ḫrḫb initially proposes other prospective brides to him instead, Baal's daughter Pidray and Attar's daughter ybrdmy, which lead some researchers to propose he is simply the matchmaker, rather than Nikkal's father as often assumed. Yarikh shows no interest in either of these goddesses. After showing he is willing to offer a large amount of silver, gold and lapis lazuli and promising that he is capable of siring a child he secures a permission to marry Nikkal. He states that he will "make her fields vineyards, fields of her love orchards," which is both a figurative and metaphorical reference to the marriage being fruitful according to Steve A. Wiggins. It has been proposed that a poorly preserved section of the text describes a sexual encounter between Nikkal and Yarikh, but this remains uncertain.
