= Šauška =

Hurrian goddess of love and war

- Goddess of love, war, and healing
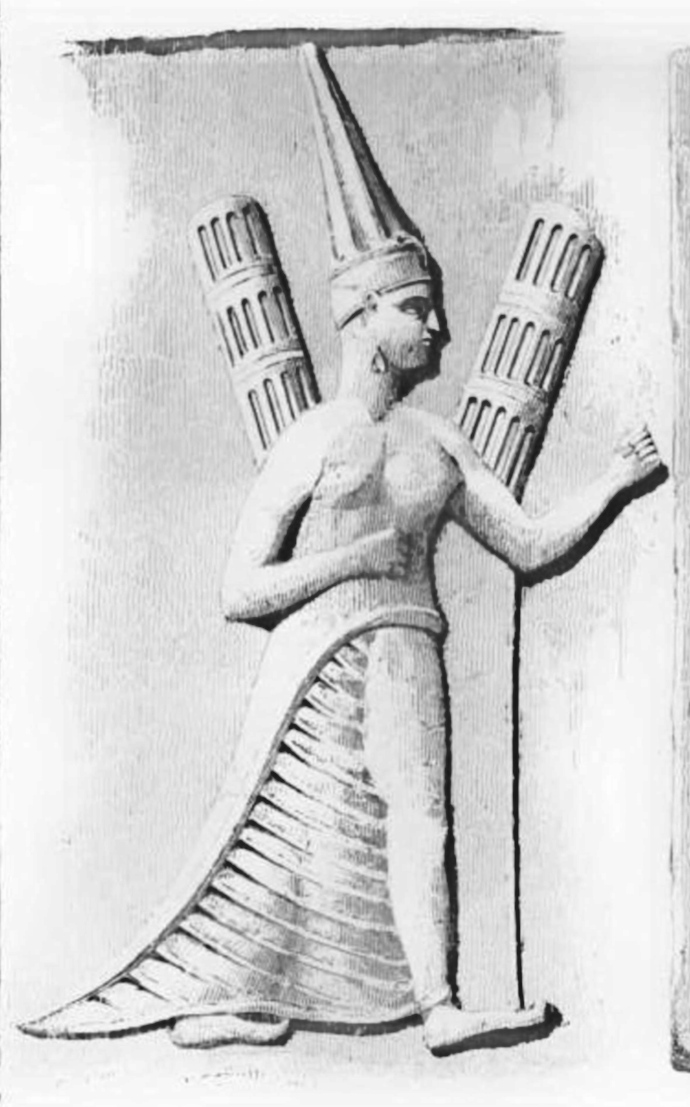
- Engraving of a relief from Yazılıkaya near Hattusa (Boǧazkale) depicting Šauška
- Major cult center: Nineveh, Nuzi

Genealogy
- Parents: Anu and Kumarbi; alternatively Kušuḫ
- Siblings: Teshub and Tašmišu

Equivalents
- Mesopotamian: Inanna/Ishtar
- Ugaritic: Ashtart
- Hittite: possibly Anzili

Šauška (Shaushka), also called Šauša or Šawuška, was the highest ranked goddess in the Hurrian pantheon. She was associated with love and war, as well as with incantations and by extension with healing. While she was usually referred to as a goddess and with feminine titles, such as allai (Hurrian: "lady"), references to masculine Šauška are also known. The Hurrians associated her with Nineveh, but she was also worshiped in many other centers associated with this culture, from Anatolian cities in Kizzuwatna, through Alalakh and Ugarit in Syria, to Nuzi and Ulamme in northeastern Mesopotamia. She was also worshiped in southern Mesopotamia, where she was introduced alongside a number of other foreign deities in the Ur III period. In this area, she came to be associated with Ishtar. At a later point in time, growing Hurrian influence on Hittite culture resulted in the adoption of Šauška into the Hittite state pantheon.

In Hurrian myths, many of which are only known from their Hittite translations, Šauška commonly appears either as an ally of her brother Teshub, or as a heroine in her own right. Specific narratives describe her battles against the sea monster Ḫedammu, the diorite giant Ullikummi, the sea god Kiaše and the mountain god Pišaišapḫi. She also appears in a myth about Hašarri, a personified olive tree, who needs to be protected by her from various threats.

Both in the sphere of cult and in myths, Šauška was usually accompanied by her two handmaidens, Ninatta and Kulitta. Other servant deities associated with her appear only in lists of offerings and descriptions of rituals.

== Name ==
The name Šauška has a Hurrian origin and can be translated as "The Great One" or "The Magnificent One." Many Hurrian deities had similarly simple, epithet-like names, for example Allani ("the lady"), Mušuni ("she of justice"), Kumarbi ("he of Kumar") or Nabarbi ("she of Nawar").

The spellings vary between sources. The Bogazköy Archive attests multiple, both logographic (^{d}IŠ_{8}-TÁR, ^{d}LIŠ and ^{d}GAŠAN) and syllabic (no less than eleven variants), the latter present in exclusively Hurrian contexts. Logographic spellings also predominate in literary texts, but Song of Hašarri is an exception and seemingly consistently employs the syllabic spelling ^{d}Ša-wu_{u}-us-ga. Early Hurrian king of Urkesh and Nawar, Atal-shen, used the logogram ^{d}INANNA to write Šauška's name, while later on in Nuzi one logographic spelling was ^{d}U. In Mitanni documents, the usual spelling is syllabic, ^{d}Ša-uš-ka-a.

Based on administrative texts of the archives of the Third Dynasty of Ur, the early spelling was ^{d}Ša-u_{18}-ša. In Mari in the Old Babylonian period the name was spelled as ^{d}Ša-ú-úš–an, and was often preceded by the epithet al-la-e-en, understood as allai, "lady," equivalent of Sumerian gašan and Akkadian bēltu. The same epithet is attested from other Hurrian texts, sometimes in the variant allai Ninuwa, "lady of Nineveh." Other Hurrian goddesses, for example Hebat or Pinikir, could be referred to as allai too. Additionally, it was the origin of the name of the goddess of the underworld, Allani.

Two alphabetic spellings are attested in Ugaritic texts, šwšk and šušk.

=== Uncertain attestations ===
According to Joan Goodnick Westenholz, it is difficult to tell if full correspondence can be assumed to exist between Hurrian Šauška and Assyrian Ishtar of Nineveh, especially in inscriptions of Shamshi-Adad I, who might have introduced religious innovations in Nineveh to compete with the religious importance of the city of Assur and its manifestation of Ishtar. A different view is presented by Beate Pongratz-Leisten, who understands Šauška and Ishtar of Nineveh to be fully analogous, and as a result, refers to the goddess whose temple existed in Babylon at the end of the second millennium BCE and to Šauška as known from sources from the Hurrian kingdom of Arrapḫa as one and the same.

It is assumed that Ishtar references in documents from the Old Assyrian trading colony Kanesh are Ishtar of Assur rather than Šauška, but she might nonetheless appear in Assyrian theophoric names attested on tablets from that site.

Daniel Schwemer argues that NIN-na-gar^{ki} (Belet Nagar) from the inscription of Tish-atal was a local form of Šauška. This view has been evaluated critically by Joan Goodnick Westenholz, who remarks that with the exception of their gender these deities do not appear to be similar to each other.

== Character ==
Šauška was a goddess of love (including sexual love), as well as war. In the former of these two roles, she was believed to be able to guarantee conjugal love, return or deprive of potency, but also turn women into men and vice versa. Especially in Anatolia, she was also closely associated with magic and incantations, and as a result could be invoked as a healing deity. Hittite texts describe her as taršikantaš MUNUS-aš, which can be translated as "the woman of that which is repeatedly spoken," most likely a reference to her role in incantations.

Šauška was also the tutelary goddess of Nineveh, and in Hurrian myths she is often called the "queen" of that city. Other Hurrian texts refer to her as Ninuwawi, "she of Nineveh," or Ninuvaḫi, "the Ninevite." The association is also present in Mesopotamian texts: these from the Ur III period label her as ni-nu-a-kam, "of Nineveh," while an Old Babylonian god list from Uruk mentions her under the name ^{d}INANNA ni-nu-a.

Unlike the Mesopotamian Ishtar, as well as the other "Ishtars" known to Hurrians and Hittites (such as Ishtar of Samuha, possibly the same deity as the enigmatic "Goddess of the Night," DINGIR.GE_{6}), Šauška did not have a pronounced astral character. The role of a divine representation of Venus was instead played by Pinikir in the Hurrian pantheon. Like Šauška, she was associated with Ishtar. A single ritual text pairs them together.

=== Androgynous or genderfluid characteristics ===
While primarily referred to as a goddess, Šauška had both a feminine and masculine aspect and in reliefs from the Yazılıkaya sanctuary appears twice, once among the gods, accompanied also by her handmaidens Ninatta and Kulitta, and once among goddesses. A Hurrian ritual text separately mentions offerings to "male attributes" and "female attributes" of Šauška.

Hittitologist Gary Beckman states that "ambiguous gender identification" was a characteristic of a category he refers to as "Ishtar type" goddesses, encompassing also the likes of Ninsianna and Pinikir.

Similar to Enheduana's description of Inanna/Ishtar having the ability to turn a man into a woman or a woman into a man, Šauška is noted to have this ability in the context of making men and women infertile, symbolically emasculating and de-feminizing them.

== In visual arts ==
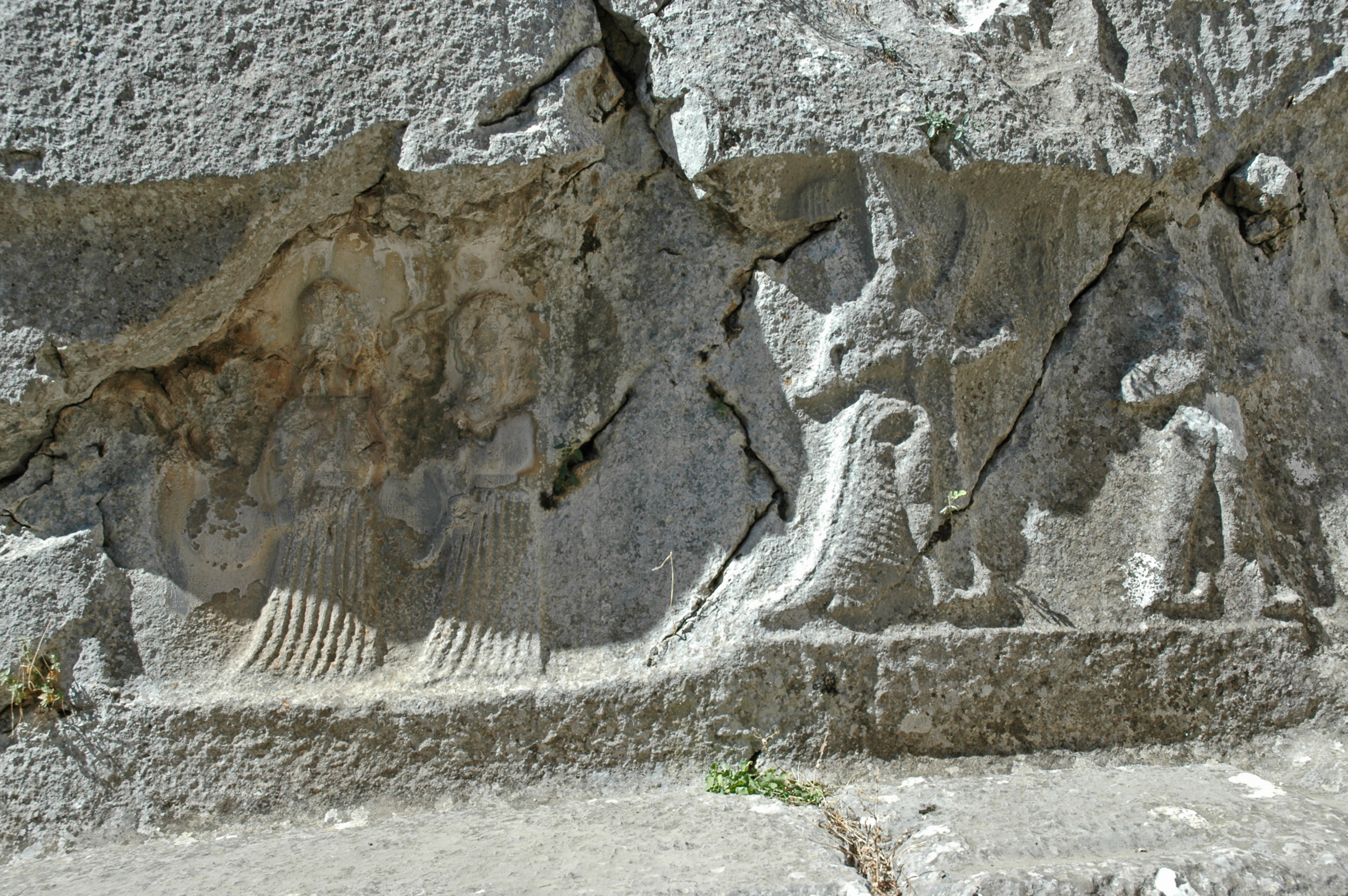
Šauška accompanied by Ninatta and Kulitta in the procession of deities in Yazılıkaya

Šauška was commonly depicted in the company of and her two attendants, Ninatta and Kulitta, both on reliefs and on cylinder seals.

A Hittite text describing the appearance of statues of various deities mentions two depictions of Šauška, one seated, winged and holding a cup, and another, masculine, also winged and armed with a golden ax. Both were said to be flanked by Ninatta and Kulitta and accompanied by an awiti, a mythical winged lion.

On a relief from Yazılıkaya, the masculine form of Šauška appears in the procession of male deities (figure designated as 38 in modern reference works), accompanied by Ninatta and Kulitta (figures 36 and 37). While beardless, he wears the same pointed headwear as the other male deities, as well as a robe exposing one leg and pointed shoes. An inscription placed above a gap between figures 55 and 56 in the procession of female deities indicates that originally feminine Šauška was depicted there as well, but this relief is presently missing. A single relief similar to these from Yazılıkaya has however been found in nearby Yekbas.

A further relief of Šauška is known from Malatya, where she is depicted holding an ax and a hammer, and wearing the same type of horned headwear as the male deities. Similar reliefs are also known from other locations, including Ain Dara and Aleppo, though the weapons are not always the same, with clubs and spears also attested. Like the Yazılıkaya reliefs, they tend to show Šauška with one leg exposed. Some of them are winged.

Lapis lazuli figurines of Šauška are known from Carchemish and possibly Alalakh.

=== Uncertain examples ===
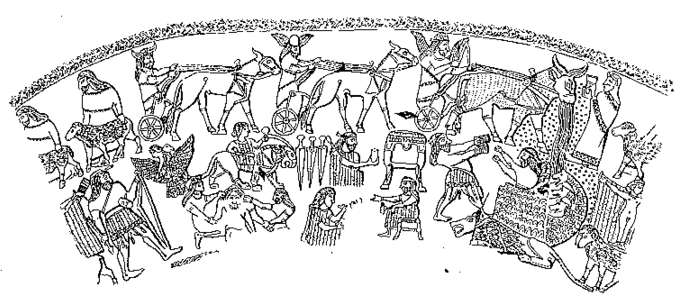
A drawing of the figures depicted on the bowl of Hasanlu. A naked goddess, who might be Šauška, is visible in the bottom right corner.

Some possible depictions of Šauška are also known from Nuzi, though they are not directly labeled as such in inscriptions from the site or other textual sources. One is a figure of a deity holding an axe and a geometric emblem, dressed in shoes with pointy ends and a robe exposing the abdomen and legs, but lacking any identifiable sex characteristics, which is assumed to fit Šauška's dual nature as both masculine and feminine deity. Additionally, goddesses depicted on eastern Hurrian cylinder seals in company of various animals (lions, goats, bulls, snakes, scorpions) and mythical beasts (lion-dragons, bullmen, sphinx-like and snake-like creates, two-headed griffin demons) are often assumed to be Šauška, her hypostases or similar local deities, though this identification is uncertain due to lack of textual evidence.

Frans Wiggermann additionally considers it possible that some depictions of the weather god accompanied by a naked goddess, usually interpreted as Adad and Shala, instead represent Teshub and his companion, who he assumes to be Šauška.

The naked goddess depicted on the bowl of Hasanlu might be Šauška, as the scenes depicted on it are sometimes interpreted as a representation of myths from the Kumarbi cycle.

== Position in the pantheon ==
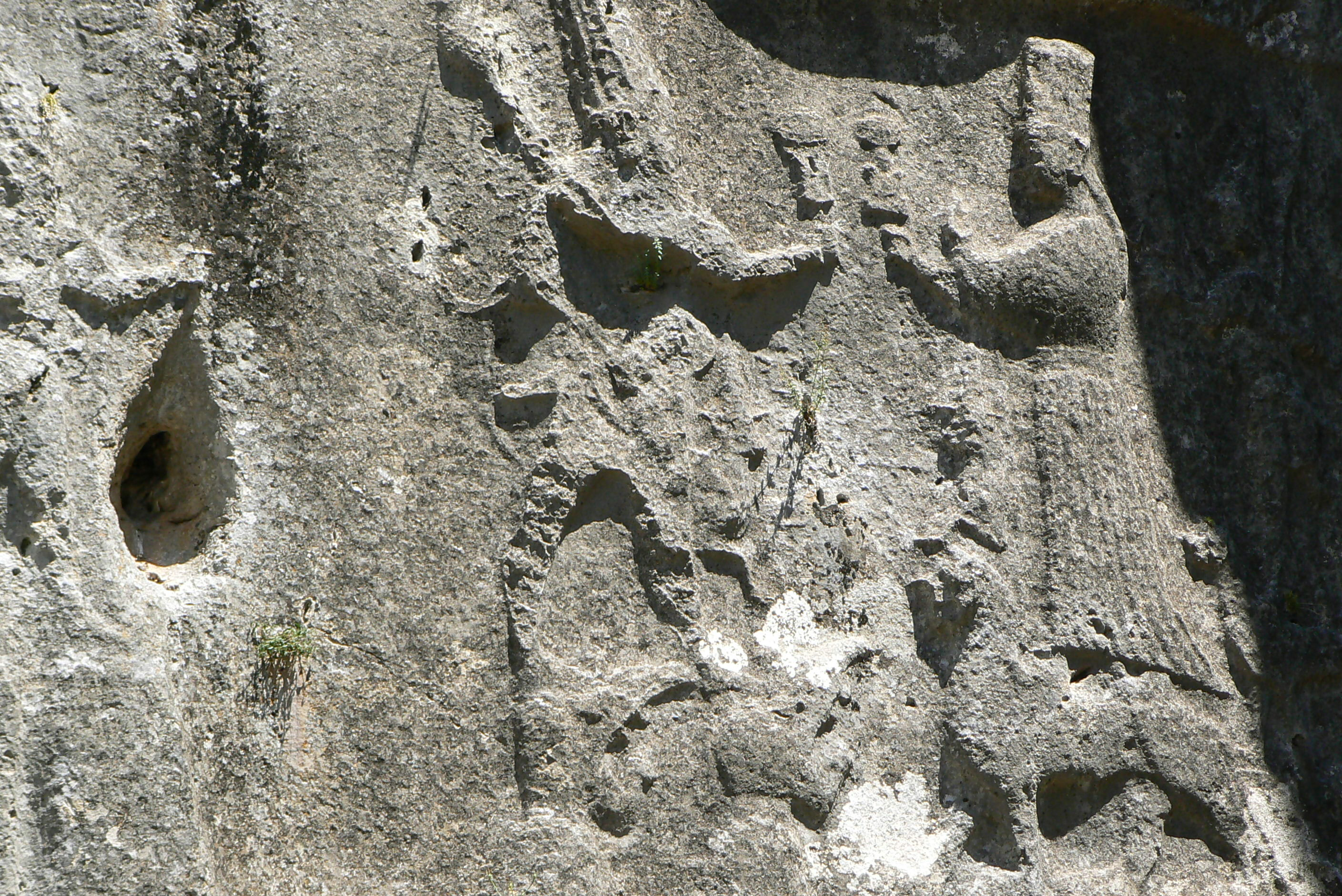
Teshub and Hebat on the Yazılıkaya reliefs

Šauška was the highest ranked goddess in the Hurrian pantheon, as evidenced for example by documents from the kingdom of Arrapḫa and by the correspondence of the Mitanni king Tushratta. Her status was lower only in Kizzuwatna, where the main Hurrian goddess was instead Hebat, absorbed from the pantheon of Halab (Aleppo) and regarded as the wife of Teshub. Šauška's secondary position compared to Hebat is particularly visible in Hittite lists of divine witnesses of treaties. According to Alfonso Archi, Shaushka was nonetheless one of the three most commonly worshiped unmarried Hurrian goddesses in the west, next to Allani and Išḫara, while according to Gernot Wilhelm her position in Alalakh and Ugarit was the same as in the east. Šauška could be included in kaluti (offering lists) dedicated to the circle of Teshub, in which case she was placed between the god Ea and her servants Ninatta and Kulitta, or to these dedicated Hebat, in which case she could be placed between Aya and Shuwala, but she could also head a kaluti of her own, which included deities such as Allani, Išḫara and Nikkal.

=== Family ===
Western Hurrians regarded her as Teshub's sister, but their relation in eastern Hurrian pantheons from the Mittani Empire or various kingdoms east of the Tigris is uncertain. They could be worshiped side by side, but Šauška was never explicitly identified as Teshub's spouse.

Marie-Claude Trémouille notes that as the sister of Teshub, she was presumably the daughter of Anu and Kumarbi. However, the first myth in the so-called Kumarbi cycle, which deals with the birth of his children, does not mention her, even though she is referred to as the sister of both Teshub and his brother (and sukkal) Tashmishu in other compositions. It is possible more evidence was present in sections which are not preserved. Mary R. Bachvarova proposes that Šauška might have been born before the storm god. In an alternate tradition, she was the daughter of the moon god, Kušuḫ, likely due to influence of Mesopotamian religion, in which her counterpart Inanna was most commonly viewed as a daughter of the moon god Nanna and his wife Ningal. While Kušuḫ is also attested as the father of Teshub, according to Daniel Schwemer the reference is isolated and it is presently not possible to evaluate its implications.

Šauška was typically regarded as unmarried and childless.

=== Court ===
Ninatta and Kulitta, a dyad of Hurrian musician goddesses always listed together, were her handmaidens, though in the Bronze Age they are only attested in texts from Hattusa and Ugarit. In ritual texts other deities were grouped with Ninatta and Kulitta as members of Šauška's entourage. Examples include Šintal-wuri (Hurrian: "seven-eyed"), Šintal-irti ("seven-breasted"), Šinan-tatukarni ("twofold at [?] love") and Namrazunna (from Akkadian namru, shining, and Zunna, a Hurrianized spelling of Suen, name of the moon god; unlike him Namrazunna was female). In one text, Ninatta, Kulitta, Šintal-irti and Namrazunna are grouped together as "first servants," while Šinan-tatukarni, Ali, Halzari and Taruwi are labeled as "last servants." It is assumed that the former group should be understood as bringers of luck, and the latter as having the opposite impact.

Another minor deity, Undurumma, attested with certainty in only one document, was identified as Šauška's sukkal (attendant deity). The same ritual text also mentions other Hurrian sukkals: Immanzizi, Ḫupuštukar, Tenu, Lipparuma and Mukišanu. It is uncertain if Unudurupa (also spelled Unduruwa), associated with Allani in another document, was the same deity as Undurumma.

An association between Šauška and Nabarbi is also attested. In some itkalzi ("purification") rituals they appear alongside the pairs Hutena and Hutellura, Ea and Damkina, and Hebat and Mušuni. One of such texts refers to "water of Šauška and Nabarbi," believed to have purifying qualities.

=== Attested equivalences ===
Šauška was regarded as the Hurrian equivalent of Ishtar, and Mesopotamian lexical lists could refer to her as "Ishtar of Subartu." The term "Subartu" designated areas north of Mesopotamia. Both in ancient documents and in past scholarship the terms "Subartu" and "Subarians" usually refer to Hurrians. In Ugarit Šauška could be associated with Ashtart. However, in four Ugaritic texts Ashtart instead corresponds to Išḫara. Mary R. Bachvarova and Gernot Wilhelm consider it possible that Anzili was regarded as her Hittite counterpart, though this view is not accepted by Volkert Haas, who points out that Anzili was paired with the goddess Zukki, while Šauška was not.

== Worship ==
Both Šauška and her primary cult center, Nineveh, are mentioned for the first time in a text from Puzrish-Dagan dated to the 46th year of Shulgi's reign. The city already existed in the Sargonic period, but according to Gary Beckman it is unknown if it was inhabited by Hurrians and if Šauška was worshiped in it at the time. Joan Goodnick Westenholz argues that in the light of later evidence and well attested Hurrian names of various locations in northern Mesopotamia, it is plausible that Nineveh was already Hurrian during the reign of kings of Akkad.

Šauška, directly identified as the goddess of Nineveh, was also worshiped in Nuzi, where she appears in theophoric names, one example being Ar-Šauška. She was most likely worshiped in a double temple dedicated jointly to her and Teshub. Documents from Nuzi listing oil offerings to various deities additionally attest the worship of other goddesses referred to as "Ishtars": IŠTAR Ḫumella, IŠTAR Akkupaweniwe, IŠTAR Tupukilḫe, IŠTAR Putaḫḫe, IŠTAR Allaiwašwe (first half of the name might be identical with the word allai, "lady"), and IŠTAR bēlat dūri. Most of these epithets are either Hurrian or Hurrianised, and their meaning is unknown. An exception is bēlat dūri, which means "lady of the city walls" in Akkadian. It is also known that in Ulamme, a Hurrian city like Nuzi located in the kingdom of Arrapḫa, IŠTAR Ḫumella was associated with Nergal. A further cult center of Šauška known from the Nuzi texts is Lupti, identified with modern Taza Khurmatu.

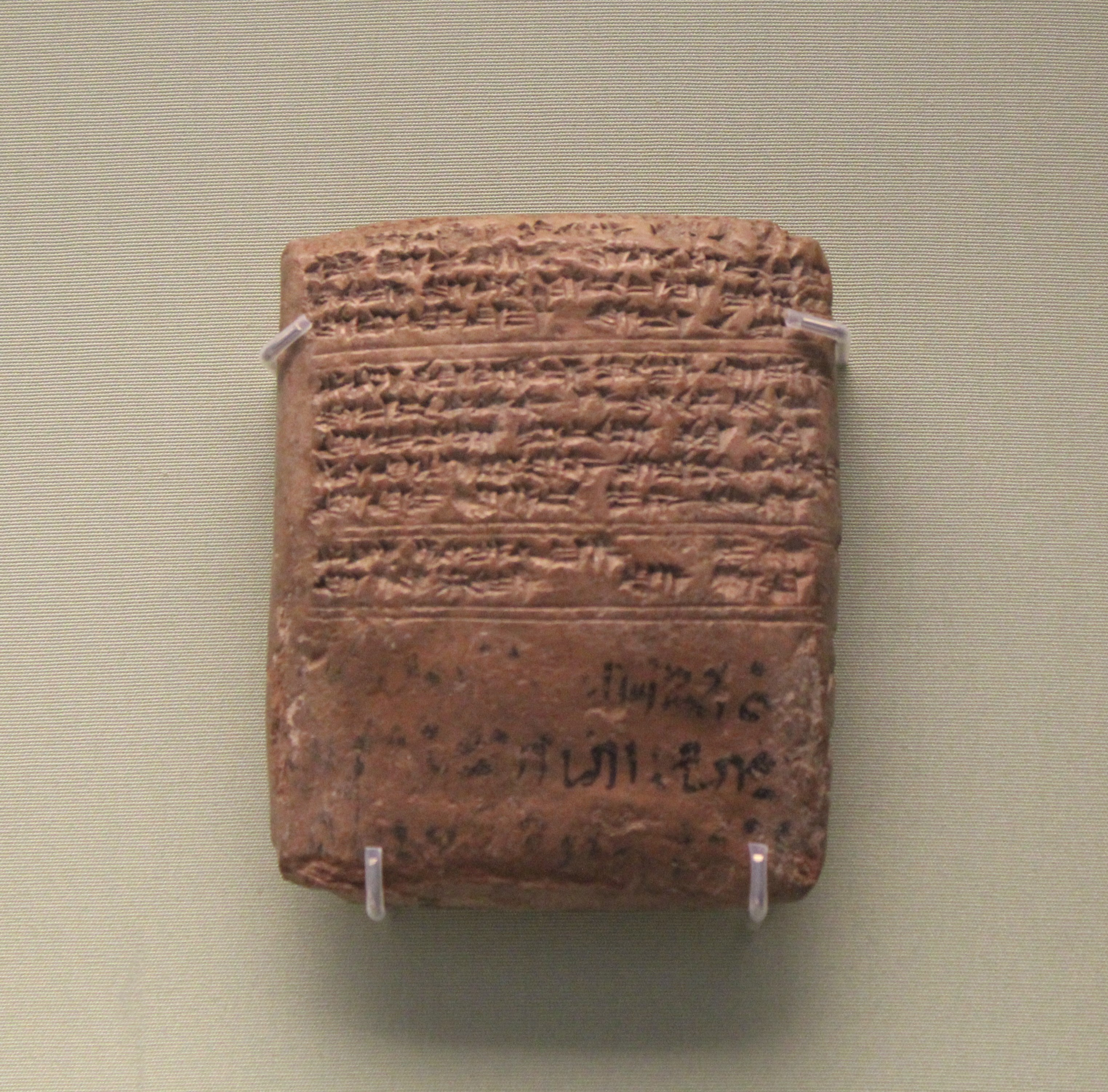
Amarna letter EA 23, which mentions a statue of Šauška

An important document pertaining to worship of Šauška in the Mittani empire is the Amarna letter EA 19, written by Tushratta, king of Mitanni to his father-in-law, pharaoh Amenophis III, which mentions a statue of Šauška meant to help with the recovery of the ailing ruler:

Thus Šauška of Niniveh, mistress of all lands: "I wish to go to Egypt, a country that I love, and then return." Now I herewith send her, and she is on her way.
(...)
May Šauška, the mistress of heaven, protect us, my brother and me, 100,000 years, and may our mistress grant both of us great joy. And let us act as friends.
Is Šauška for me alone my god(dess), and for my brother not his god(dess)?

Šauška was also worshiped in various cities in Syria. In Ugarit she appears in a ritual dedicated to the local goddess Ashtart. One section of the text pertaining directly to the Hurrian goddess is written in Ugaritic. She was also venerated in Alalakh, though Marie-Claude Trémouille notes that the logogram IŠTAR might instead denote Išḫara in sources from that city. Shaushka is however unambiguously attested in personal names, such as Arib-Šauška and Wandi-Šauška. In Emar she appears exclusively in Hurro-Hittite documents, and bears the Hurrian epithet awar(r)iwe, "of the steppe".

A genre of Hurrian songs whose name, zinzabuššiya, is derived from that of an unidentified bird, was associated with the worship of Šauška according to Hittite documents. The bird in mention, zinzabu, was also associated with her.

=== Mesopotamian reception ===
It is presently uncertain under what circumstances Šauška and other foreign deities were introduced to the pantheon of Mesopotamia during the Ur III period. Tonia Sharlach notes the areas in which they were originally worshiped form a horseshoe around territories the Ur state controlled, from Upper Euphrates and Khabur triangle to Kirkuk and Diyala. In addition to Šauška, the Hurrian examples include Allatum (Allani) from Zimudar and Shuwala from Mardaman. While foreign deities were generally not worshiped in the official provincial shrines of the Ur III state, Šauška appears to be an exception, as offerings to her took place in the provincial shrine in Umma, where she received linen textiles, possibly clothing meant for a cult state. However, she only rarely received offerings at the royal court.

In the Old Babylonian period the worship of Šauška persisted in Isin, where she appears in offering lists and in a local god list, in a section dedicated to manifestations of Ishtar. A forerunner to the later god list An = Anum known from Uruk from the same period also mentions her. She is also present in texts from Mari from the period of Zimri-Lim's reign.

Theophoric names invoking Šauška are also known from Mesopotamian sources from Puzrish-Dagan, Ur, and Lagash, for example Ur-Šauša and Geme-Šauša, both using the standard Ur III spelling of the name.

=== Hittite reception ===
Šauška was also worshiped by the Hittites, who received her from the Hurrians. The Bogazköy Archive contains many references to Šauška. There are few, if any, references to any "Ishtar-type" goddesses in texts from the Old Hittite period, indicating that Shaushka only gained her importance in Anatolia, attested from the Middle Hittite period onward, under Hurrian influence. The annexation of Kizzuwatna in particular is assumed to be a contributing factor. 25 local hypostases of Šauška or other goddesses represented by the logogram ^{d}IŠTAR are known from Hittite sources. In addition to Šauška of Nineveh, these from the cities of Lawazantiya, Hattarina and Tameninga occur particularly commonly. Also common are references to Ishtar of Samuha, usually identified by researchers as the so-called Goddess of the Night. Many of the locations associated with Šauška in Hittite documents were located in northern Syria and southeastern Anatolia, and both she and any other goddesses referred to as "Ishtars" were apparently not associated with any of the oldest Hittite religious centers like Nerik and Zippalanda. There is nonetheless evidence for worship of her in cities like Katapa and Lanta, which according to Gary Beckman belonged to the central Hittite area, and she likely had a temple in Hattusa as well.

Šauška is mentioned in documents from the reign of king Hattusili III, who married Puduhepa, the daughter of this goddess' priest from Lawazantiya, Pentipsharri. Some members of the royal court during his reign had theophoric names invoking Šauška, some of them combining linguistically Hittite and Hurrian name elements. A document known as the "Apology" or "Autobiography" of Hattusili III indicates that he named his son and eventual successor, Tudḫaliya IV, as priest of Šauška of Samuha. Šauška was also introduced to many northern Hittite towns during the reign of Tudḫaliya IV, alongside other foreign deities such as Ishtar of Babylon, Syrian Milku or the "storm god of Assur" (Adad) .

Due to the convention of logographic writing of theonyms in Hittite texts, it is difficult to tell what types of clergy belonged to the cult of Šauška and served as the staff of her temples. An exception is the case of ^{lú}kirištenna, who were directly associated with festivals dedicated to her.

== Myths ==
=== Cycle of Kumarbi ===
Šauška plays a major role in myths forming the cycle of Kumarbi, known largely from their Hittite translations.

In the Song of Ḫedammu, she is the central protagonist. She discovers the existence of the eponymous antagonist, a voracious sea monster who was the son of Kumarbi and Šertapšuruḫi, a daughter of his ally, the sea god Kiaše, and informs Teshub about it. After hearing the news, Teshub starts crying. The following scene is poorly preserved, but it is possible that a violent struggle occurs between Teshub and his allies and Kumarbi. When the text resumes, both sides are being admonished by the god Ea, who warns them about the potential dire consequences of their lack of concern of welfare of their human followers. Šauška therefore devises a non-violent solution to the threat of Ḫedammu. She seduces the eponymous antagonist, and with the help of her servants Ninatta and Kulitta tricks him into drinking a sedating potion, which seemingly leads to his defeat, though the ending is not preserved. It is possible that like some of the other antagonists, he was not killed, but merely had to abstain from trying to overthrow Teshub.

In the Song of Ullikummi, after the sun god Šimige informs Teshub about the birth of a new threat, the diorite giant Ullikummi, Šauška joins her brother in a journey to mount Hazzi, from which they can see the new foe. She unsuccessfully attempts to seduce the monster by adorning herself with sea shells and singing a song which reaches both earth and heaven, but a sea wave informs her her efforts are in vain as the monster is incapable of feeling anything.

She also appears in the Song of ^{d}LAMMA, in which she is attacked by the eponymous deity while traveling with Teshub in his chariot. According to Marie-Claude Trémouille this myth emphasizes her role as a war deity. While she does not play an active role in the Song of Silver, she is mentioned in passing as a (half-)sister of Kumarbi's half human son, Silver.

=== Other myths ===
Šauška is referenced in a fragmentary myth dealing with the sea. It relays that at one point the sea caused a flood which reached the heavens, and demanded tribute of gold, silver and lapis lazuli from the gods, with Kumarbi possibly urging the other deities to pay. The deity who brings the tribute to the sea is Šauška (^{d}IŠTAR). It has been pointed out that this text resembles an Egyptian composition about the goddess Astarte and the sea, known from the so-called "Astarte papyrus," though the latter bears similarities to the Baal Cycle as well.

Another myth (KUB 33.108) deals with the conflict between Šauška and the mountain god Pišaišapḫi, described in it as a rapist. In return for sparing him in spite of his crime he promises to tell her the story of Teshub's victory over the sea and the subsequent rebellion of the mountain gods against him.

Song of Hašarri, only known from fragments, seemingly recounts a story in which Šauška raises the eponymous entity, whose name can be translated as "oil." It has been proposed that in the context of this myth Hašarri should be understood as a personified olive tree. Volkert Haas proposed that this myth might have belonged to the cycle of Kumarbi, but this proposal is not universally accepted. The restoration of the plot is uncertain, both due to state of preservation and the still imperfect understanding of Hurrian language. In known fragments Šauška seeks the help of Ea, as suggested to her by Kumarbi, assembles various gods for uncertain reasons, protects Hašarri from a lion, and eventually rejoices watching the olive tree's growth, possibly supplemented with the help of her magic. Ninatta and Kulitta also make a brief appearance in an unknown role.

Šauška also replaces Ishtar in the Hurrian translation of the Epic of Gilgamesh. However, in the Hittite version Ishtar's replacement is instead a goddess whose name is written as ^{d}IŠ_{8}-TÁR-iš, whose identity cannot be determined with certainty.

== Later relevance ==
=== Assyrian Ishtar of Nineveh ===
Iron Age attestations of the goddess of Niniveh come exclusively from Assyria. Her character in this period was shaped by associations with Ishtar of Assur and Ishtar of Arbela, and especially under the rule of the Assyrian Sargonids, all three of them were in turn influenced by Ninlil, as a result of the Assyrian rulers pairing all of these goddesses with the head of the imperial pantheon, Ashur.

Some Hurrian elements nonetheless survived in Nineveh. Šauška's role as a healing deity seemingly resurfaces in the documents from the reign Ashurnasirpal I, who prayed to the Ishtar of Nineveh to be relieved from physical and mental pains. Additionally, Frans Wiggermann considers a text describing Ishtar of Nineveh whose "upper parts are Bel, and (...) lower parts are Ninlil" to be evidence of the deity's androgynous character. A further example of Hurrian influence is the fact that in the first millennium BCE Ninatta and Kulitta are attested in the entourages of Ishtar of Arbela, Ishtar of Assur, and Ishtar of Nineveh. The Akkadian spellings of their names known from neo-Assyrian sources are ^{d}Ni-ni-tum and ^{d}Ku-li-it-tum. It is also possible that the frequent appearances of Adad side by side with Ishtar in neo-Assyrian treaties were the influence of Hurrian beliefs regarding the close connection between Teshub and Šauška.

Sargon II in a single document used the name "Šawuška" to refer to a goddess he called the "dweller in Nineveh." This is assumed to be the last pre-modern mention of her as a distinct figure.

=== Ugaritic Ishtar Hurri and Phoenician Astarte Hurri ===
It has been proposed that a figure known as Ishtar Hurri (the Hurrian Ishtar first attested in texts from Ugarit written in Akkadian, was analogous to Šauška. While other explanations of the epithet Hurri have also been proposed, according to Mark Smith they are not plausible. The "Hurrian Astarte" is known from 8th century BCE Sidon.
