= Ḫiriḫibi =

Ugaritic god of Hurrian origin

- Divine marriage broker

Genealogy
- Children: Nikkal (disputed)

Ḫiriḫibi is the conventional vocalization of ḫrḫb, a name of a deity known only from a single Ugaritic text, the myth Marriage of Nikkal and Yarikh. It is presumed that he was a Hurrian god in origin, and that his name is derived from that of a mountain located somewhere to the north or northeast of historical Assyria. In the narrative he appears in, he seemingly functions as a marriage broker mediating between Yarikh and the family of Nikkal. It has also been proposed that he was her father, though this assumption continues to be disputed due to relying on a speculative restoration of a damaged passage.

== Name ==
The nature of the deity whose name is written as ḫrḫb in the Ugaritic alphabetic script is uncertain, though most authors agree that he was a Hurrian god in origin. This theory was already considered plausible in early scholarship in the late 1930s and 1940s. The name is commonly vocalized as Ḫiriḫibi or Ḫiriḫbi. Sometimes romanizations without breves such as Khirikhbi or Hirhib are used. Less commonly the name is vocalized as Harhab. The meaning of the name Ḫiriḫibi in Hurrian would be "he of mount Ḫiriḫi". The suffix -bi is well attested in the names of Hurrian deities, such as Kumarbi and Nabarbi, respectively "he of Kummar" and "she of Nawar".

Based on evidence from texts from the reign of Tiglath-Pileser I, Mount Ḫiriḫi was located in the area Assyrians referred to as Ḫabḫi, located to the north and northeast of Assyrian lands, close to the land of Pabḫi, presumed to be the area around Mount Judi, and to the upper sections of the rivers Khabur and Great Zab. The name of this mountain most likely has Hurrian origin, and it is assumed that it was derived from a word referring to a specific species of trees, as a Hurrian text from Emar mentions a type of wood called ^{giš}ḫi-ri-ḫi.

Nicolas Wyatt's proposal that ḫrḫb corresponds to the Hurrian sun god, Šimige, is regarded as implausible.

== Character ==
Ḫiriḫibi appears to function as a divine marriage broker in the only text he is mentioned in. He negotiates between Yarikh, the prospective husband of the goddess Nikkal, and her family. His character is additionally described with two distinct epithets. The better attested of them, which occurs thrice in the text, is mlk qẓ, typically translated as "the king of summer." A less common translation is "the king of the summer fruit." Both meanings are attested for the Ugaritic qẓ, as well as for its Hebrew cognate.

The translation of his second epithet, mlk ‘aġzt, which is attested only once, is not certain, but today most researchers prefer relating it to marriage in some way. This view relies on the presumed similarity of Ugaritic compound ‘aġzt and the Akkadian term aḫūzatu, designating a special type of protective relationship between the head of a household and a single woman, in some regards comparable to marriage, though not identical with it. Examples of such translations are "the king of marriages," "the king of weddings," "the king of the wedding season" and "the counselor for protection-marriages." However, they are not universally accepted, as it has been argued that the relation of Ḫiriḫibi to other deities does not appear to fit the definition of aḫūzatu. Other proposals rely on the meaning of his other attested epithet and treat ‘aġzt as a reference to a season, leading to translations such as "the aestival king" and "the autumn king." A third theory connects ‘aġzt with Arabic ġazā, "to go forth to fight with" or "to make a raid." Translations based on it include "the king of ravaging" and "the king of the raiding season." While semantically similar epithets are known from Mesopotamian texts, for example Zababa was called šar tāḫazi and Nergal - šar tamḫāri, both meaning "the king of battle" in Akkadian, they never describe deities who ever appear in similar roles as Ḫiriḫibi in known texts, making this proposal implausible. Some researchers, including Aicha Rahmouni, argue that due to limited evidence it is best to consider mlk ‘aġzt impossible to translate.

The word mlk is often translated simply as "king" in both cases, but Rahmouni proposes that a less direct translation, "divine patron of," might be more accurate.

== In the Ugaritic texts ==
Ḫiriḫibi is presently only known from the Ugaritic myth Marriage of Nikkal and Yarikh. In the past it was assumed that a theophoric name invoking him is also known from Nuzi, but the supposed ḫi-ri-ḫi-ili, "(the god of mountain) Ḫiriḫi is my god," turned out to be a scribal mistake for the common name šu-ri-ḫi-i-li whose spelling shows a degree of variance in known texts.

It is assumed the myth originated somewhere in Upper Mesopotamia, and that it was either a direct translation of a presently unknown Hurrian composition or at least an adaptation. It is possible that originally the god marrying Nikkal was instead Hurrian Kušuḫ. A reference to Dagan and his cult center Tuttul is sometimes considered evidence in favor of seeking the myth's origin outside Ugarit.

Ḫiriḫibi is first mentioned in the proemium, where the narrator praises him and Nikkal. The narrative then switches to the Kotharat, but Ḫiriḫibi reappears afterwards when Yarikh petitions him to arrange a marriage with Nikkal for him. He initially tried to convince the moon god to marry either the daughter of Baal, Pidray, or the goddess ybrdmy. The identity of ybrdmy is a matter of scholarly debate. She is not known from any other texts. It has been suggested that she was another daughter of Baal, an alternate name of Pidray, or a daughter or sister of Attar. It is not known if presenting Yarikh with alternate potential brides reflects a hitherto unknown custom which was a part of marriage negotiations in Ugarit. The moon god shows no interest in either goddess, and eventually marries Nikkal.

The exact nature of the relation between Ḫiriḫibi and Nikkal has been long disputed in scholarship. Starting with the earlier editions of the text, it was often assumed that a broken passage directly calls Nikkal bt ḫrḫb, "the daughter of Ḫiriḫibi," a restoration first proposed by Harold Louis Ginsberg in 1939, but Aicha Rahmouni notes that it remains speculative, and there are no other direct evidence for these two deities being regarded as father and daughter. Many authors nonetheless accept that he was Nikkal's father, including Manfred Weippert and Gabriele Theuer. Steve A. Wiggins considers it a plausible interpretation, though he notes that no direct statements supporting it are present in the text. In early scholarship it was occasionally assumed that Ḫiriḫibi was the father of Yarikh instead.
