= Kešši =

Hurrian literary character

In-universe information
- Occupation: Hunter
- Spouse: Šintalimeni
- Origin: Hurrian

Kešši (also romanized as Keshshi, with the diacritics omitted) or Kešše is the eponymous protagonist of a narrative of Hurrian origin known from Hattusa and Amarna. Fragments of versions in Hurrian, Hittite and Akkadian have been discovered. Individual events vary between them, and they do not fully correspond to each other, but it is agreed that they record variants of the same main narrative. In addition to Kešši himself it involved his wife Šintalimeni, his mother, his wife's evil brother Udipšarri, a number of Hurrian deities such as Kušuḫ and Kumarbi and other characters. The Hurrian version preserves sections focused on Kešši's despair after he is asked to donate his emmer, an argument between him and his wife and a number of references to events involving deities. The Hittite passages describe how Kešši abandoned his duties towards the gods and his mother after getting married, a hunting trip and a number of dreams he has in its aftermath. Individual elements of the narrative have been compared to tales focused on other heroes, namely Gurparanzaḫ and Gilgamesh.

== Background ==
The name Kešši was written in cuneiform as ki-iš-ši, ki-eš-ši or ki-eš-še. It has Hurrian origin, and can be translated as "the one who sets (traps)", literally "hunter". The literary character bearing it is the eponymous protagonist of a narrative of Hurrian origin known from sources from Hattusa and Amarna. According to Alfonso Archi, it originated in modern Syria. In modern scholarly literature it is variously referred to as the Tale of the Hunter Kešši and his Beautiful Wife, Romance of the Hunter Kešši, Song of Kešše or Kešše Epic. It is one of the six texts from Hattusa whose colophons state that they belonged to a genre designated by the Sumerogram ŠÌR, "song", the other five being the Song of Going Forth, Song of Release, Song of Ullikummi, Song of the Sea and a local adaptation of the Epic of Gilgamesh. Gary Beckman classifies it as a "tale", which is a label he applies to literary texts from the Hittite archives which feature human protagonists and do not deal with cosmology, which according to him separates them from myths.

== Textual sources ==
Fragments of the tale of Kešši in multiple languages have been discovered. The Hurrian version is known from eighteen fragments, including one duplicate. It is estimated to originally have consisted of over 3000 lines spread over 15 or more clay tablets, but only around 450 lines have been identified, and most of them are not fully preserved. Six other fragments belong to a Hittite version. The Hittite translation seemingly does not follow the Hurrian original directly, which according to Alfonso Archi might indicate it relied on an oral version of the story. All of the Hittite and Hurrian fragments come from Hattusa, and the only further source preserving the tale is a single Akkadian tablet from Amarna. It is one of the two Akkadian tablets from this site which parallels finds from Hattusa, the other being a copy of the šar tamḫāri epic, and due to a number of textual peculiarities typical for Akkadian of the Hittite archives it is presumed it was imported to Egypt from the Hittite Empire, in contrast with some of the lexical texts which instead show more similarities to Akkadian material from Ugarit. Gernot Wilhelm has proposed that the Akkadian translation might have originally been developed in the Mitanni Empire due to prestige of the language, with a written Hurrian version being a later development reflecting the prestige of Hurrian in Anatolia instead. Due to the state of preservation of the Akkadian Kešši tablet it is impossible determine if its contents directly correspond to any of the known Hurrian passages.

Eva von Dassow based on the plurality of variants concludes that similarly to tales focused on figures such as Gilgamesh and Kumarbi, the story of Kešši "had a life outside their fixation in text".

== Story ==
While it is agreed that all versions of the tale of Kešši record the same central narrative, individual details vary between them. It is possible that the plot revolved around Kešši going from one unlucky event to another. In addition to Kešši himself, the characters include his mother, his wife Šintalimeni (Note: Šintalimeni is also known from a birth incantation, which describes her as a midwife, which according to Mary R. Bachvarova indicates she might have had a more extensive role in Hurro-Hittite literature.) and her brother Udipšarri, described as an "evil man". The Hurrian version of the tale also mentions a man named Urumzi and a woman named Tadizuli, who might be Kešši's parents. (Note: Tadizuli's name is identical with that of a woman betrothed to the hero Gurparanzaḫ in another Hurrian tale.) One of the passages additionally mentions the Hurrian moon god, Kušuḫ. (Note: Mary R. Bacharova suggests his appearance might be connected to Šintalimeni's role as a midwife, as the moon was associated with pregnancy.) He meets with a deity named Tapšuwarri in it. Kumarbi and Ea-šarri are also mentioned, but it remains uncertain what roles they played in the story.

The Hittite version indicates that the story takes place near the mountain Natara and the city of Urma, but neither toponym is attested elsewhere. Another toponym, Illawa, is also attested elsewhere as the name of a Hurrian deity, which according to Volkert Haas makes it possible to assume that all of the mentioned places are to be sought in areas historically inhabited by Hurrians.

In the Hurrian version, Kešši is asked to provide a part of his harvest of emmer, which causes him to weep and then experience dreams pertaining to this misfortune. Another scene might describe Kešši's refusal to hunt, while yet another focuses on an argument between him and his wife in front of an assembly of elders. It is presumed she is portrayed as the party who is in the wrong, possibly due to the influence of her brother.

In the surviving sections of the Hittite version, Kešši's mother remarks that ever since he married Šindalimeni, he started to neglect his duties towards the gods and ceased to hunt to provide for her, which prompts him to go on a hunt, but as his actions have angered the gods, he fails to catch any game. He spends three months in the mountains, and eventually falls sick. He is rescued through the intervention of a "father deity", an ancestor god. The reference to this figure is considered to be an echo of a non-Hurrian Syrian tradition of ancestor worship. The story resumes after a lacuna with a description of Kešši's dreams and his mother's interpretation of them. However, the text is fragmentary. One of the dreams apparently involves a meteorite.

== Comparative scholarship ==
Gernot Wilhelm argues that the tale of Kešši can be compared to that focused on another Hurrian hero, Gurparanzaḫ, and suggests both of them reflect the importance of hunters in Hurrian mythology.

The scenes focused on Kešši's dreams and their interpretation has been compared to passages dealing with analogous topics in the Epic of Gilgamesh. Similar to how Kešši's dreams are interpreted by his mother, Gilgamesh's are on two separate occasions explained by his mother Ninsun and then by Enkidu. Mary R. Bachvarova remarks that despite the similarities the sections of the Epic of Gilgamesh focused on dream interpretation are absent from the extant fragments of its Hittite adaptation.
