= Sun god of Heaven =

Hittite solar deity

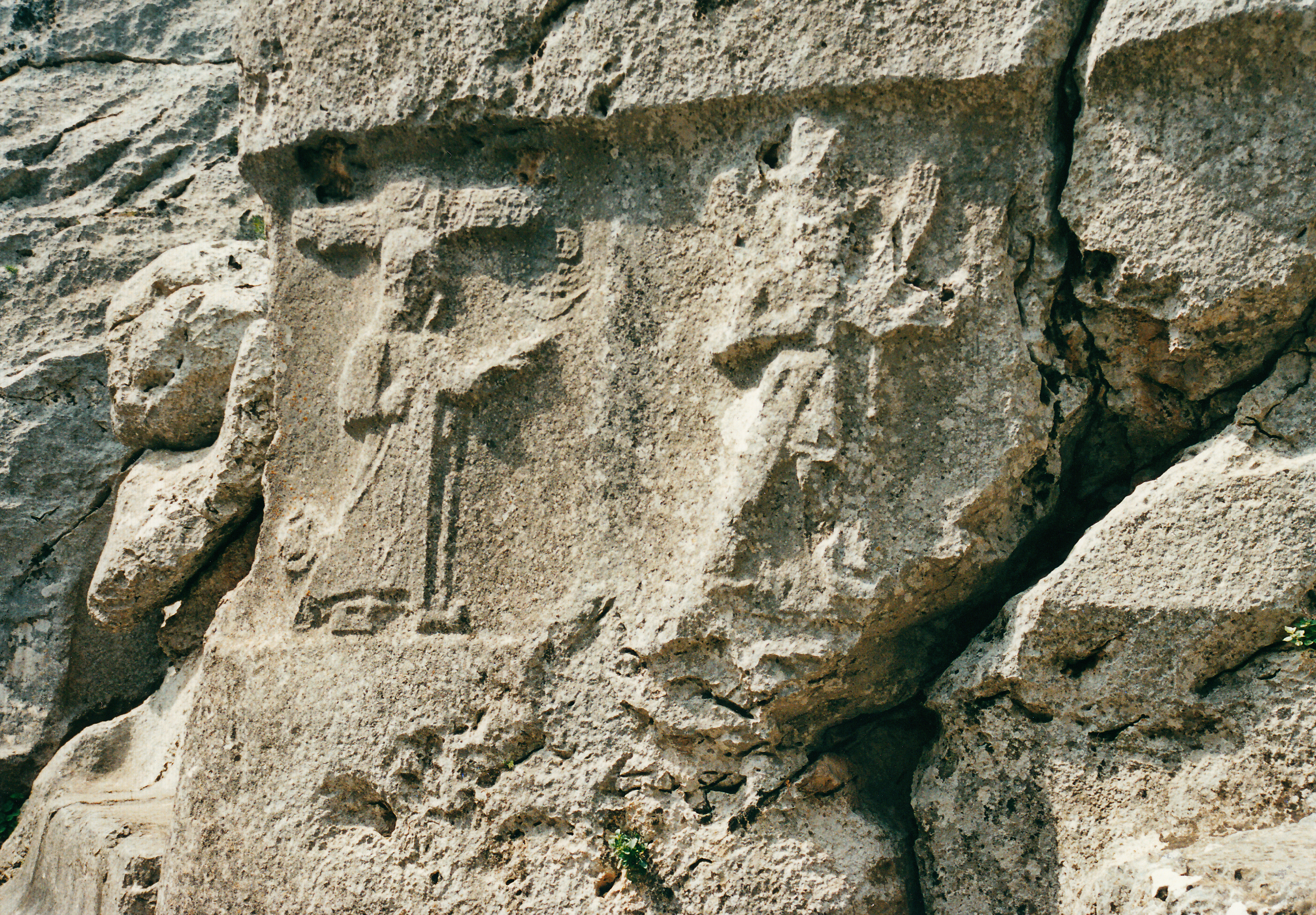
Depiction of the Sun god of Heaven at the Hittite cliff sanctuary of Yazılıkaya (At left, alongside the Moon god (Hurrian Kušuḫ, Hittite Arma)

The Sun god of Heaven (Hittite: nepišaš Ištanu) was a Hittite solar deity. He was the second-most worshipped solar deity of the Hittites, after the Sun goddess of Arinna. The Sun god of Heaven was identified with the Hurrian solar deity, Šimige.

From the time of Tudḫaliya III, the Sun god of Heaven was the protector of the Hittite king, indicated by a winged solar disc on the royal seals, and was the god of the kingdom par excellence. From the time of Suppiluliuma I (and probably earlier), the Sun god of Heaven played an important role as the foremost oath god in interstate treaties.

As a result of the influence of the Mesopotamian Sun god Šamaš, the Sun god of Heaven also gained an important role as the god of law, legality, and truth.

== See also ==
- List of solar deities

== Bibliography ==
- Piotr Taracha: Religions of Second Millennium Anatolia. Harrassowitz, Wiesbaden 2009, ISBN 978-3-447-05885-8.
- Calvert Watkins: "The Golden Bowl: Thoughts on the New Sappho and its Asianic Background." Classical Antiquity. 26, 2007, pp. 305–324.
- Volkert Haas, Heidemarie Koch: Religionen des alten Orients: Hethiter und Iran. Vandenhoeck & Ruprecht, Göttingen 2011, ISBN 978-3-525-51695-9.
- Maciej Popko: Völker und Sprachen Altanatoliens. Harrassowitz, Wiesbaden 2008, ISBN 978-3-447-05708-0.
