= Yarikh =

Ancient Near Eastern moon god

- Member of Gaṯarāma/Gaṯarūma
- Other names: Arakh, Erakh
- Major cult center: Larugadu, Ugarit, Jericho, Beth Yerach
- Planet: Moon

Genealogy
- Spouse: Nikkal (in Ugarit)

Equivalents
- Mesopotamian: Sin
- Hurrian: Kušuḫ

Yarikh (Ugaritic: 𐎊𐎗𐎃, yrḫ, "moon"), or Yaraḫum, was a moon god worshiped in the Ancient Near East. He is best attested in sources from the Amorite city of Ugarit in the north of modern Syria, where he was one of the principal deities. His primary cult center was most likely Larugadu, located further east in the proximity of Ebla. His mythic cult center is Abiluma. He is also attested in other areas inhabited by Amorites, for example in Mari, but also in Mesopotamia as far east as Eshnunna. In the Ugaritic texts, Yarikh appears both in strictly religious context, in rituals and offering lists, and in narrative compositions. He is the main character in The Marriage of Nikkal and Yarikh, a myth possibly based on an earlier Hurrian composition. The eponymous goddess was regarded as his wife in Ugarit, but she is not attested in documents from most other Syrian cities, and most likely only entered the Ugaritic pantheon due to the influence of Hurrian religion.

Ugarit ceased to exist during the Bronze Age collapse, and while Yarikh continued to be worshiped in the Levant and Transjordan, attestations from the first millennium BCE are relatively rare. He played a small role in Phoenician, Punic, Ammonite and Moabite religions, and appears only in a small number of theophoric names from these areas. It is also presumed that he was worshiped by the Israelites and that the cities of Jericho and Beth Yerach were named after him. While the Hebrew Bible contains multiple polemics against the worship of the moon, it is not certain if they necessarily refer to Yarikh.

== Name ==
The name Yarikh (Yariḫ; 𐎊𐎗𐎃 yrḫ) is an ordinary Ugaritic word which can refer not only to the lunar god, but also to the moon as a celestial body. A further meaning attested for it is "month." Earlier forms of the name, (Y)arakh and (Y)erakh, are attested as elements of Amorite theophoric names.

The name is grammatically masculine, which is the norm for lunar deities across the Ancient Near East, in contrast with Greece, where the moon corresponded to a female deity, Selene.

Cognates of Yarikh's name are present in many Semitic languages. As a name for the celestial body and the ordinary word "month" they are attested in Hebrew: ירח yrḥ, Phoenician: 𐤉𐤓𐤇 yrḥ, Old Aramaic: 𐡉𐡓𐡇 yrḥ (however, the name of the Aramaic moon god, Śahr, is not a cognate); Palmyrene Aramaic: 𐡩𐡴𐡧 yrḥ; and Nabataean Aramaic: 𐢍𐢛𐢊 yrḥ). The Akkadian word warḫum or warḫu, "month" or rarely "moon," is a cognate as well, as are Old South Arabian wrḫ, "month," and the word warḫ, "moon" or "month," present in Ethiopian Semitic languages.

== In early Amorite tradition ==
It is presumed that the moon god was one of the major deities of the early Amorite pantheon. Daniel Schwemer outright states that next to Hadad he was the main deity of the entire area inhabited by the Amorites. He was commonly worshiped as a family deity. His presumed main cult center, attested in the Ugaritic texts, but located further inland in central Syria, presumably in the proximity of Ebla, was Larugadu (lrgt), identified with Arugadu from the earlier Eblaite sources. No references to this location from outside the Ugarit and Ebla corpora of texts are known. Since Yarikh himself is not attested in the sources from the latter city, it is presumed that he was only introduced to northern Syria by the Amorites. The Eblaites instead referred to their moon god as Suinu, similar as their contemporaries in Kish, and in addition to phonetic writing Zu-i-nu adopted the Mesopotamian convention of using ^{d}EN.ZU to represent the name of the moon deity in cuneiform. While Suinu's name is a cognate of Akkadian Sin, it is presumed that his cult developed locally and was not introduced from Mesopotamia. His cult center was apparently NI-ra-ar^{ki}, a city located close to Ebla. A second possible lunar deity worshiped in Ebla was Šanugaru. Due to Yarikh's association with Larugardu, it has additionally been argued that the god Hadabal (^{d}NI.DA.KUL), who was worshiped there in the third millennium BCE, had lunar character, but this conclusion is not universally accepted. Alfonso Archi assumes that the diffusion of Hadabal's cult, whose territorial extent is well documented in Eblaite texts, does not appear to match his presumed astral character.

Yarikh (Erakh) is well attested in Amorite theophoric names. In Old Babylonian Mari, he appears in thirty nine individual types of names. Examples include Abdu-Erakh, "servant of Yarikh," Uri-Erakh, "light of Yarikh," Yantin-Erakh, "Yarikh has given" and Zimri-Erakh, "protection of Yarikh." Individuals bearing them came from various areas in the kingdom and near it, including the city of Mari itself, Terqa, Saggarâtum, the Khabur Triangle (where particularly many are attested), the area around the Balikh, Suhum and Zalmaqum. A certain Yantin-Erakh served as a troop commander under Zimri-Lim. Similar theophoric names are also known from Eshnunna. A document excavated there indicates that at one point in the Old Babylonian period a certain Abdi-Erakh was a king of an unspecified city in Mesopotamia. After its initial discovery, Thorkild Jacobsen proposed that he ruled Eshnunna itself, but this view has since been disproved. Another Abdi-Erakh, a contemporary of Ipiq-Adad of Eshnunna, apparently ruled over Ilip and Kish.

It is sometimes argued that in Mesopotamia Erakh/Yarikh and Sin might have been understood as, respectively, Amorite and Akkadian names of the same deity, rather than two separate moon gods. However, Ichiro Nakata lists them separately from each other in his overview of deities attested in Mari, unlike the various variants of the names of the weather or solar gods. The deity Sin-Amurrum, attested in the incantation series Maqlû (tablet VI, verse 4) according to Karel van der Toorn might be the Mesopotamian name of the Amorite moon god.

== In Ugarit ==
Yarikh was regarded as one of the primary deities of the Ugaritic pantheon. His role as a lunar deity was qualified by the epithet nyr šmm, "luminary of the heavens" or "lamp of the heavens," which has been compared to a similar Akkadian title of the Mesopotamian moon god Sin, munawwir šamê u ersetim, "illuminator of the heavens and earth." He could also be referred to as a "prince" (zbl), which is also attested in the case of multiple other deities, including the weather god Baal and the underworld god Resheph, and is meant to signify high status. Furthermore, a single passage refers to him as "the most pleasant of the gods" (n’mn ‘ilm), which was apparently meant to highlight his physical attractiveness. According to Dennis Pardee, it is possible he was believed to spend the day in the underworld. It has also been suggested that he could function as its gatekeeper, a role which is otherwise well attested for the god Resheph. These two gods are paired in an incantation against snakebite.

In the standard Ugaritic deity lists, Yarikh follows the Kotharat and precedes Mount Saphon. In another similar text, he follows the sea god Yam and Baal, whose names are written in a single line, and precedes the craftsman god Kothar. He is also attested in ritual texts. During celebrations which took place during the full moon in an unknown month, two bulls had to be sacrificed for him. Subsequently in an offering list included in the same prescriptive text it is stated he also receives a ram after Baal of Ugarit and Baal of Aleppo, and before a ram and a bull were offered to Anat of Saphon. Another offering list places him between the Kotharat and Attar as a recipient of a ram. He could also receive offerings alongside Nikkal. Additionally, the terms Gaṯarāma and Gatarūma, designations of a group of god which are etymologically, respectively, dual and plural forms of the name Gaṯaru, might in some cases refer to Yarikh, grouped with Gaṯaru, the sun goddess Shapash or both of these deities.

Thirty individuals bearing theophoric names invoking Yarikh have been identified with certainty in the Ugaritic texts. A particularly commonly occurring name, Abdi-Yarikh (written as ‘bdyrḫ in the Ugaritic alphabetic script), meant "servant of Yarikh." Additionally, a single name known from a text written in the standard cuneiform script uses the logogram ^{d}30 as the theophoric element, but it is not certain if it refers to Yarikh or another lunar deity. The Hurrian Kušuḫ is also attested in Ugaritic names, appearing in a total of six (one of which belongs to a person from outside the city), while the Mesopotamian Sin appears in one name belonging to a Babylonian rather than a local resident. While the total number of the names invoking Yarikh and adjacent deities is smaller than that of those invoking Baal, Resheph or Shapash, he is nonetheless better attested in this capacity than multiple deities who appear frequently in myths, such as Athirat, Attar, Yam or Ashtart.

In addition to his presence in theophoric names, the Hurrian moon god Kušuḫ is also well attested in other documents from Ugarit. It has been argued that he was identified with Yarikh due to his analogous role. However, in one ritual text, KTU^{3} 1.111, Kušuḫ and Yarikh, accompanied by Nikkal, who is placed between them, receive offerings together as separate deities. Since accompanying instructions are a combination of Ugaritic (when referring to Yarikh) and Hurrian (when referring to Kušuḫ and Nikkal), it is possible that the scribe responsible for the preparation of the tablet was bilingual. Both this text and other sources from Ugarit indicate that Ugaritic and Hurrian deities could be worshiped side by side. Further lunar deities known from Ugarit include Saggar, a god presumed to be analogous to Eblaite Šanugaru, who was worshiped in association with Išḫara, hll (reading uncertain, sometimes assumed to be analogous to the god Hulelu from Emar), the father of the Kotharat, whose name might be a cognate of the Arabic word hilālun, which lead to the proposal that he was the god of the lunar crescent, and Kas’a, only attested in association of Yarikh and based on presumed cognates in other Semitic languages, for example Habrew, presumed to represent a presently unidentified lunar phase. Dennis Pardee additionally suggests that yrḫ kṯy, a hypostasis of Yarikh, might be a lunar deity of Kassite origin. The presence of the "Kassite Yarikh" in Ugaritic texts is also accepted by Mark Smith. He is attested in a prayer for well-being and in an offering list.

Yarikh appears in a number of Ugaritic myths, but his role in them does not necessarily reflect his nature as a lunar deity.

=== Marriage of Nikkal and Yarikh ===
Marriage of Nikkal and Yarikh (KTU 1.24) is the Ugaritic narrative composition which is focused on the moon god to the greatest degree. It is agreed that it describes the circumstances which lead to the marriage of the eponymous deities, though its genre continues to be a topic of ongoing scholarly debate. Steve A. Wiggins suggests that it is possible individual sections of the text do not necessarily belong to the same genre, making it possible to classify both as a myth and as a hymn.

After a proemium, which mentions some of the deities involved in the plot, and a number of verses dealing with the Kotharat, Yarikh is introduced bargaining with the god Ḫiriḫibi (who is not attested in any other sources) to be granted the permission to marry Nikkal. This most likely indicates that the latter is either her father or at least mediates on behalf of her family. Yarikh offers to pay a high bride price, including large amounts of gold, silver and lapis lazuli, and additionally states that he will "make her [Nikkal's] fields orchards," which is most likely an euphemistic way to refer to his ability to sire an heir. Ḫiriḫibi is reluctant at first, and suggests alternate brides to him: Pidray and ybrdmy. The former is known to be a daughter of Baal, while the latter is variously interpreted as a daughter of Attar, his sister, another daughter of Baal or an epithet of Pidray. Ḫiriḫibi in his speech refers to Yarikh as "son-in-law of Baal" (ḫtnm b’l), which might either refer to his prospective future after choosing Pidray, indicate that he was already married to another of the weather god's daughters, or simply serve as a courtesy title. Yarikh ultimately rejects both proposals, and states that he is only interested in Nikkal. He finally succeeds, and subsequently marries her.

It is sometimes assumed that in addition to the scenes described above, Yarikh also appears in the heavily damaged section of the myth occupying lines 5-15 of the tablet, which according to this theory describe a sexual encounter between him and Nikkal, but this is far from certain. Steve A. Wiggins points out that even if it is accepted that sex is described, neither deity is mentioned by name, which makes it difficult to evaluate this proposal.

The background of the entire myth is most likely Hurrian. It might be either a direct Ugaritic translation of a Hurrian original, or a less direct adaptation only relying on motifs from Hurrian mythology. It is agreed that Ḫiriḫibi is a god of Hurrian origin. Nikkal, presented as Yarikh's spouse in this context, but absent from other Ugaritic narratives, was a derivative of the Mesopotamian goddess Ningal, who was the wife of Sin/Nanna, the Mesopotamian moon god, and was also worshiped by Hurrians as the wife of Kušuḫ. Most likely the marital relationship between the corresponding Mesopotamian deities is also the reason behind portraying her as Yarikh's wife. It is not certain if Nikkal entered the Ugaritic pantheon directly from one of the Upper Mesopotamian cities or through a Hurrian cultural intermediary. The fact that most Ugaritic attestations of her are entries in Hurrian offering lists most likely supports the latter theory. She is otherwise almost entirely absent from western Syrian sources from the second and first millennia BCE.

=== Other Ugaritic narrative texts ===
In addition to Marriage of Nikkal and Yarikh, the moon god also appears in the text KTU 1.114. While relatively well preserved, it is considered difficult to translate, and many details remain unclear. Apparently during a banquet organized by El, Yarikh for unknown reasons acts as a dog and crawls under the tables. Deities stated to be familiar with him, including Ashtart and Anat, offer him choice cuts of meat, while those who do not know him poke him with a stick. The actions of the two goddesses are rebuked by a nameless "porter of the house of El," who complains that they are giving a dog food. The rest of the composition focuses on El getting drunk and subsequently struggling with the effects of alcohol, and Yarikh is not referenced again. However, the final lines apparently relay how to prepare a remedy for hangover using dog hair, which might be a reference to his role. It is not certain why Yarikh acts in a dog-like manner in this text. His behavior might simply be tied to the theme of alcohol consumption.

While Yarikh himself makes no appearance in KTU^{2} 1.12, a minor goddess appearing in this text, Talish (tlš) is described as his handmaiden (‘amt). The origin of her name is not known, though it has been proposed it was derived from a root meaning "tardy" or "delay," or from the verb "to knead." Alternatively, it might be related to the ordinary name Tu-li-ša attested both in Ugarit and in Nuzi. Talish occurs in parallel with Dimgay, another minor goddess, the handmaiden of Athirat, which is sometimes used to argue in favor of them being a single deity with a binomial name, Dimgay-wa-Talish (dmg w tlš). In the surviving passage, both of them suffer from labor pain. Since a well known Mesopotamian composition casts Sin in the role of a god helping in such situations, Yarikh's absence from the surviving sections of the text, coupled with Talish being explicitly associated with him, is considered difficult to explain by researchers.

The myth KTU 1.92 mentions Yarikh in passing as one of the gods who receive game from Ashtart after her return from a hunt.

== In Emar ==
In Emar, the name of the moon god was represented by the logogram ^{d}30. It is not certain if he can be identified as Yarikh. According to Brian B. Schmidt the moon god worshiped in Emar was Sin. However, it is not impossible that more than one deity of such character was present in the local pantheon, and Gary Beckman lists the West Semitic reading as one of the four possibilities, next to Mesopotamian, Hurrian and Anatolian (Arma). It has also been proven that in at least some cases the logogram refers to Saggar, already worshiped in the proximity of Emar, in Ma-NE^{ki}, in the third millennium BCE. Other writings of his name are also attested, including multiple syllabic and a second logographic one, ^{d}ḪAR. Priests of the deity designated by ^{d}30 are attested in documents from Emar, but there is no indication that one of the few temples identified during excavations belonged to him.

== In the first millennium BCE ==
While Ugarit ceased to exist during the Late Bronze Age collapse, possibly due to the activity of the Sea Peoples, the worship of Yarikh continued elsewhere in the first millennium BCE.

=== Phoenician and Punic sources ===
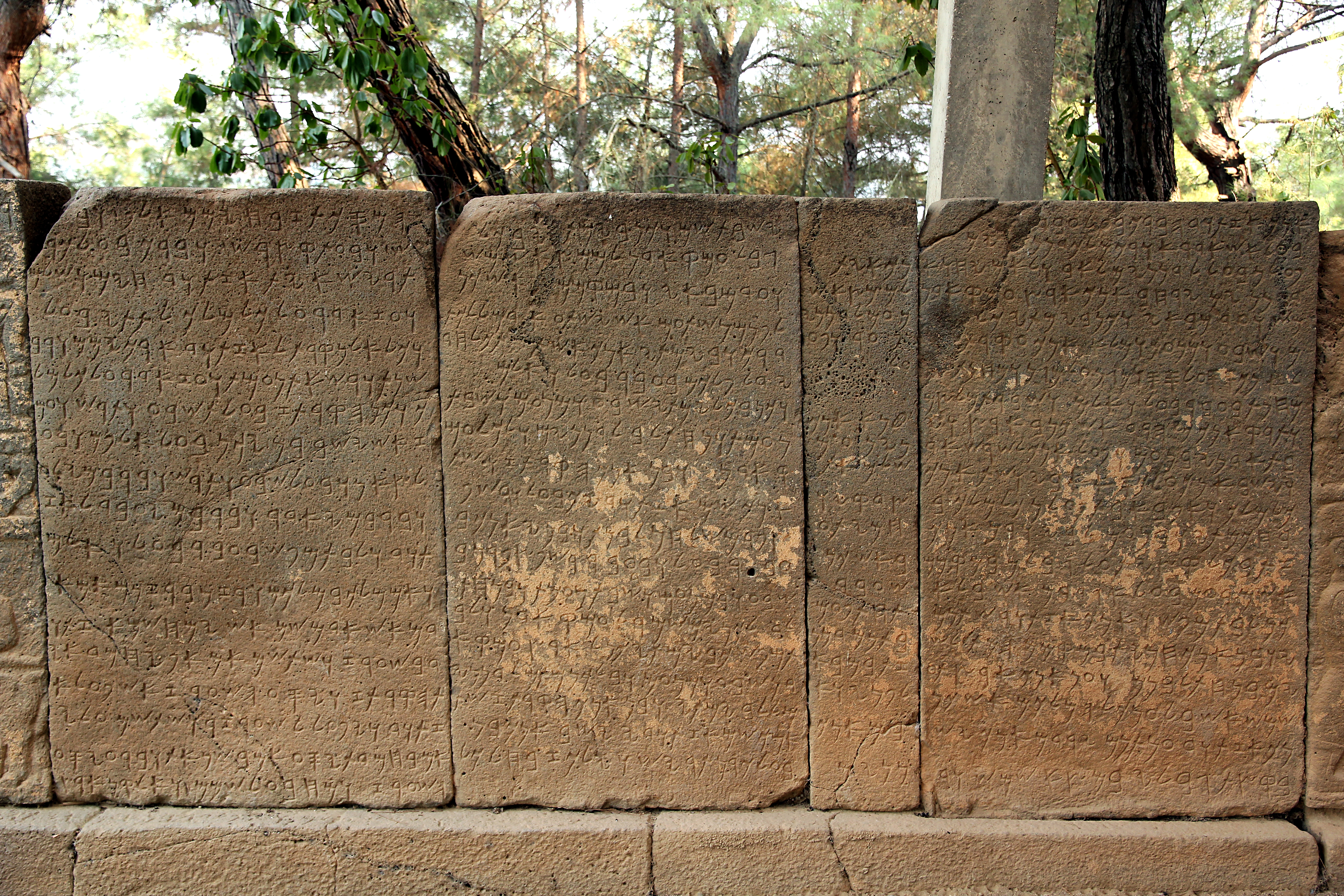
The Phoenician version of the Karatepe bilingual.

No explicit references to Yarikh occur in any Phoenician sources, such as inscriptions from Byblos, Tyre and Sidon. The research of Phoenician religion is considered difficult due to the scarcity of written materials and the small number of direct references to deities other than the principal patron of each city, such as Baalat Gebal in Byblos, Eshmun in Sidon or Melqart in Tyre. The role of astral deities such as Yarikh was small, possibly due to their lack of a connection to maritime trade, shared by many of the major deities of this culture. The Phoenician version of the Karatepe bilingual mentions the sun and the moon in a context which might indicate that deities corresponding to them are meant, but they are not singled out in such a way as the weather god Baal is in the same document.

In known Punic sources, Yarikh is similarly absent from inscriptions, though he does appear in theophoric names. One attested example is ‘bdyrḥ, "servant of Yarikh." Similar evidence exists for another moon god, Saggar, who might have functioned as a personification of the new moon in Punic religion. Lunar symbols are present on Punic stelae, though since the accompanying inscriptions usually only mention the heads of the pantheon, Baal Hammon and Tanit, it has been argued that they represent the former of these two deities, rather than Yarikh. However, no textual sources support the theory that Baal Hammon was a lunar deity, and the fact that in Palmyra he was treated as entirely separate from the local lunar god Aglibol might be evidence on the contrary. Additionally, it is possible that said symbols, as well as other similar astral ones, do not represent any specific god, but are meant to illustrate the celestial nature of the main deities.

=== Ammonite and Moabite sources ===
As of 2000, only a single certain attestation of Yarikh from the kingdoms of the ancient Transjordan has been identified. One of the Ammonite kings bore the name yrḥ'zr (Jeraheazar), "Yarikh is my helper," as attested in an inscription on the plinth of a royal statue dated to around 700 BCE. Ammonite seals depicting the crescent moon are known from the seventh century BCE, but they might be related to the worship of Sin of Harran, who was known in many areas to the west and south of his cult center in the Neo-Assyrian period.

The evidence from the Moabite kingdom, which developed in parallel with the Ammon in the early first millennium BCE, is limited to artistic depictions of the lunar crescent. It has been argued that they might indicate the national god of the Moabites, Chemosh, at some point developed lunar characteristics. Known textual sources from Moab mention neither Yarikh nor Sin.

=== Israelite and Judahite sources ===
The worship of the moon was most likely practiced in the kingdoms of Israel and Judah both before the Babylonian captivity and afterwards. Evidence includes toponyms and, according to Gabriele Theuer, theophoric names invoking Yarikh, though according to Brian B. Schmidt certain examples of the latter are presently lacking. Best known presumed examples of the former include Jericho and Beth Yerach. It is also probable that the moon god of Harran, Sin, was also worshiped by the Israelites.

It has been suggested that the numerous references to the moon being a celestial body subordinate to Yahweh in the Hebrew Bible might reflect a religious polemic against the worship of lunar deities, though researchers note that caution is required in using this information to reconstruct the culture of the kingdoms prior to the period of Babylonian captivity. Direct prohibitions or condemnation of the worship of the moon are mentioned in a number of passages too, for example in Book of Job 31:26–68. Second Book of Kings 23:5 states that king Josiah of Judah banished priests making offerings to the moon alongside those devoted to other astral bodies and Baal. It is difficult to know how many of these references can be considered sources of information about Yarikh, as it is possible that they do not necessarily reflect a struggle against the preexisting cult of a local lunar deity, but rather against the mesopotamian traditions centered in Harran, which in the period of captivity and later might have been perceived as a competing creed. Placing the polemics in the distant past might therefore have been only a rhetorical device.

=== Palmyrene sources ===
In sources from Palmyra, whose pantheon known from between the late first millennium BCE and early first millennium CE included both strictly local deities and Phoenician, Mesopotamian and Arabian ones, names with the element yrḥ refer to the local god Yarhibol, rather than Yarikh. He was regarded as a solar deity. However, it is possible that he was originally a moon god, and only developed his solar traits attested in historical sources secondarily. Alternatively, his name might have instead been derived from Arabic yarḫu, "spring," which is argued to fit his association with the Palmyrene spring Efca.

== See also ==
- Iah
- Sin (god) aka Nanna
