= Kušuḫ =

Hurrian lunar god

- God of the moon
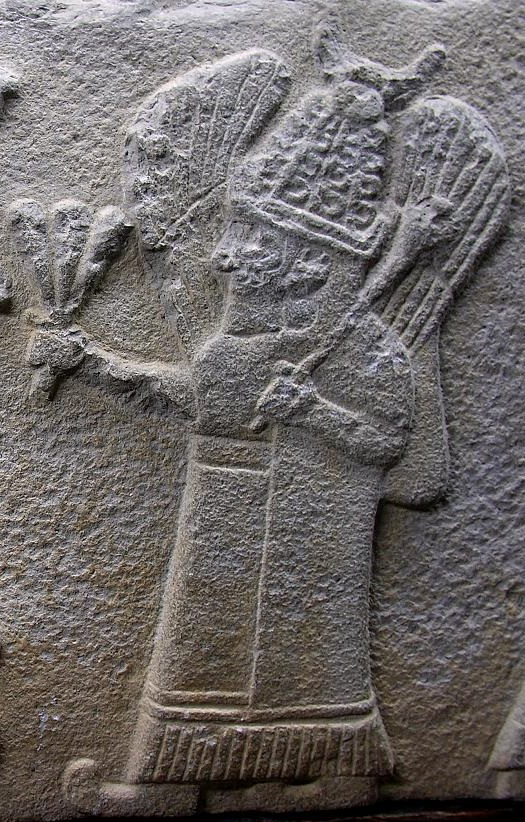
- An ancient Anatolian depiction of the moon god Arma, displaying iconography patterned after Kušuḫ's. Museum of Anatolian Civilizations, Ankara.
- Other names: Umbu
- Major cult center: Šuriniwe, possibly Kuzina (Harran?)
- Consort: Nikkal
- Offspring: Šauška (sometimes); Teššub (isolated attestation)

Equivalents
- Mesopotamian: Sin
- Ugaritic: Yarikh
- Luwian: Arma
- Hattian: Kašku

Kušuḫ, also known under the name Umbu, was the god of the moon in Hurrian pantheon. He is attested in cuneiform texts from many sites, from Hattusa in modern Turkey, through Ugarit, Alalakh, Mari and other locations in Syria, to Nuzi, located near modern Kirkuk in Iraq, but known sources do not indicate that he was associated with a single city. His name might be derived from the toponym Kuzina, possibly the Hurrian name of Harran, a city in Upper Mesopotamia, but both this etymology and identification of this sparsely attested place name remain uncertain. He was a popular, commonly worshiped god, and many theophoric names invoking him are known. In addition to serving as a divine representation of the moon, he was also associated with oaths, oracles and pregnancy. Some aspects of his character were likely influenced by his Mesopotamian counterpart Sin, while he in turn was an influence on the Ugaritic god Yarikh and Luwian Arma.

In Hurrian mythology, Kušuḫ appears as one of the allies of the weather god Teššub in his struggle against Kumarbi, but known compositions do not provide much information about his individual characteristics. It has also been proposed that the Ugaritic composition Marriage of Nikkal and Yarikh was based on a Hurrian myth about Kušuḫ, well attested as the husband of this goddess.

== Name ==
Kušuḫ, usually written ^{d}Ku-uš-uḫ in cuneiform, was the primary name of the Hurrian moon god. There is no agreement if transcriptions of Hurrian words should reflect theories about the possible presence of voiced and unvoiced consonants in them; conventional spelling of Kušuḫ's name in modern publications reflects the view that leaving the disputed ones unvoiced is preferable. The alternate spelling Kušaḫ is attested in Alalakh and uncommonly in texts from Hattusa. According to Manfred Krebernik the form Ušu is also known, though he does not list the location where sources it occurs in were found. Two separate writings of Kušuḫ's name in the Ugaritic alphabetic script are attested, kḏġ and kzġ, vocalized as Kuḏuġ and Kuzuġ, respectively.

In addition to these spellings, the name could be also represented by the logograms ^{d}30 (the numeral associated with the moon) and ^{d}EN.ZU, like that of the Mesopotamian moon god Sin. For example, according to Gary Beckman Kušuḫ might be among the deities designated by the former logogram in texts from Emar. Forms combining logographic and phonetic versions, ^{d}30-uḫ and ^{d}EN.ZU-uḫ, are also known.

It has been proposed that Kušuḫ's name is an adjective derived from the toponym Kuzina, possibly the Hurrian name of Harran. However, in the treaty between Šuppiluliuma I and Šattiwaza, Kušuḫ and the moon god of Harran appear as two separate deities. It has also been noted that Kuzina is only known from a single attestation in the so-called Tale of Appu, whose Hurrian origin is disputed, and researchers such as Itamar Singer consider it to have Hittite roots instead, though this view is not universally accepted either. This text does mention that a moon god was believed to reside in Kuzina, though according to Volkert Haas Arma might be the deity meant. At the same time, he does find the theory that Kuzina was the Hurrian name of Harran plausible.

=== Umbu ===
In addition to Kušuḫ, a secondary name of the moon god in Hurrian sources was Umbu, also spelled Umpu, Umpa and Umpi. It might have been originally in use somewhere in Syria or southern Anatolia as a part of a distinct local tradition, which would mean it only came to be adopted by the Hurrians at some point in their history. However, it is also possible that it has Hurrian origin, as a root umb- (meaning presently unknown), is attested in the Hurrian language. It has been proposed that Umbu functioned as the name of a specific manifestation of Kušuḫ, perhaps representing the full moon, though this remains speculative.

Mauro Giorgieri notes that attestations of Umbu as a fully independent deity are uncommon, and that he almost always appears alongside Nikkal. In early scholarship it was assumed that Umbu was an appellative referring to Nikkal, analogous to the second element in the full Ugaritic form of her name, Nikkal-wa-Ib, but according to Giorgieri this is not plausible in the light of more recent research. The latter epithet is most likely a cognate of either Akkadian inbu, "fruit," or ebbu, "bright" or "pure," rather than Umbu's name.

== Character and iconography ==
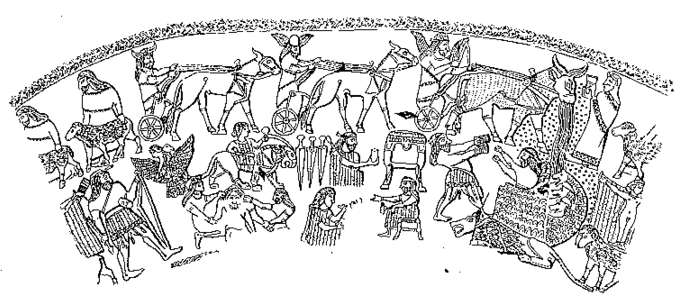
Figures depicted on the golden bowl of Hasanlu, including a possible representation of Kušuḫ in a chariot.

Kušuḫ was functioned as the god of the moon in the Hurrian pantheon. It is possible that his character was at least in part influenced by that of his Mesopotamian counterpart, Sin. Like him, he was associated with pregnancy, and could be invoked in birth incantations. However, a well attested role of Kušuḫ which according to Gernot Wilhelm sets him apart from his Mesopotamian counterpart was that of a protector of oaths, otherwise commonly associated with underworld deities in Hurrian culture. Ugaritic texts refer to him as the "king of the (oracular) decisions" as well, marking him as a deity associated with oracles.

A depiction of Kušuḫ is known from the reliefs showing a procession of deities in the Yazılıkaya sanctuary, with the figure representing him being assigned the number 35 in scholarly treatments of this site. He is depicted as winged, and his pointed cap is adorned with a lunar crescent. A possible artistic portrayal of Kušuḫ has also been identified on the golden bowl of Hasanlu, sometimes assumed to be a late example of art inspired by motifs from Hurrian mythology, on which a moon god is shown traveling in a chariot drawn by mules.

== Associations with other deities ==
=== Family and court ===
Kušuḫ's wife was Nikkal, derived from the Mesopotamian goddess Ningal. Umbu, either an alternate name of Kušuḫ or a separate deity assimilated with him, appears alongside Nikkal in Hurrian texts too. In Ugarit, she was recognized as the wife of both Kušuḫ and the local god Yarikh, but since she is best attested in texts written in Hurrian rather than in Ugaritic, Gabriele Theuer concludes that she was most likely only introduced to the city by the Hurrians. She also reached the Hittite pantheon through Hurrian mediation. Kušuḫ was also associated with Ishara due to their shared role as divine protectors of oaths. Piotr Taracha points out that it might be significant that she was already linked with another lunar god, Saggar, in the third millennium BCE in Ma-NE^{ki}, as attested in texts from Ebla.

A passage labeling Teššub as a son of Kušuḫ is known. However, it is entirely isolated; Daniel Schwmer remarks that it is difficult to evaluate its significance in absence of other evidence indicating the two were regarded as father and son. In a tradition most likely influenced by Mesopotamian views on divine genealogy, Šauška, usually the sister of Teššub, was regarded as the daughter of the moon god too.

Meindert Dijkstra proposed that the god Tapšuwari was regarded as the sukkal (attendant deity) of Kušuḫ, though he has also been interpreted as one of the members of the circle of Kumarbi. Attestations of Tapšuwari are limited to a single fragment of the Hurrian version of the myth Song of Ullikummi, and a single other literary passage, both of which also mention Kušuḫ.

=== Other lunar gods ===
Kušuḫ was regarded as the Hurrian counterpart of Mesopotamian Sin. In Ugarit, he was additionally regarded as analogous to Yarikh. However, in the ritual KTU^{3} 1.111 the two moon gods, accompanied by Nikkal, appear together and receive separate offerings, with instructions pertaining to Kušuḫ (and Nikkal) written in Hurrian, and these instead referring to Yarikh - in Ugaritic, possibly reflecting the bilingualism of the scribe.

Especially in Kizzuwatna, the character of the Luwian moon god Arma were heavily influenced by Kušuḫ's. He also came to be portrayed identically to his Hurrian counterpart, in a pointed cap with a crescent symbol and with wings on his shoulders.

Kušuḫ s name is sometimes linked by researchers with that of the Hattian moon god, conventionally assumed to bear the name Kašku, which might point at early contact between speakers of Hurrian and Hattic. However, Daniel Schwemer notes that it is possible the Hattian god was instead named Kab, as suggested in a recent alternate reading of the same passage on which the older assumption about his name relies.

== Worship ==
Kušuḫ was a high-ranking, commonly worshiped god, and he is regarded by researchers as one of the "pan-Hurrian" deities, present in the pantheons of all areas where the Hurrian language was in use, from Kizzuwatna in modern Turkey to the Zagros Mountains, similar to Teššub, Šauška, Kumarbi or Nabarbi. He appears in theophoric names from both eastern and western Hurrian cities. Examples include Eḫlip-Kušuḫ ("Kušuḫ saves"), attested in Mari (Tell Hariri) and Tigunani, Arip-Kušuḫ ("Kušuḫ gave"), known from the former of these sites, and Ḫazip-Kušuḫ ("Kušuḫ heard"), with a wide distribution, including attestations from Mari, Chagar Bazar, Shekhna/Shubat-Enlil (Tell Leilan), and Tigunani. Names with Umbu as a theophoric element are known too, examples include Mut-Umpi from Mari and Arip-Umpi from Nuzi.

According to Gernot Wilhelm, there is no indication that Kušuḫ was particularly strongly associated with any specific city. A double temple dedicated to him and Teššub existed in Šuriniwe in the eastern Hurrian kingdom of Arrapḫa. He was one of the principal deities in the state pantheon of Mitanni as well, and in the treaty between Šuppiluliuma I and Šattiwaza appears right behind Teššub, the head of the pantheon. In offering lists from western Hurrian centers, he appears as a member of the circle of deities (kaluti) of the same god.

=== Ugaritic reception ===
The worship of Kušuḫ is well attested in Hurrian documents from Ugarit. In offering lists, he appears between Kumarbi and Iya (Hayya). Once he instead occurs between the latter deity and Dadmiš. A single ritual text indicates that he could be worshiped side by side with local moon god Yarikh, which is one of the examples of the well attested phenomenon involving combining Ugaritic and Hurrian elements in the religious practice of this city. Kušuḫ is also attested in theophoric names from Ugarit, with a total of six individuals bearing them presently known, though one of them was apparently not an inhabitant of the city. The name Eḫli-Kušuḫ occurs the most commonly.

=== Hittite reception ===
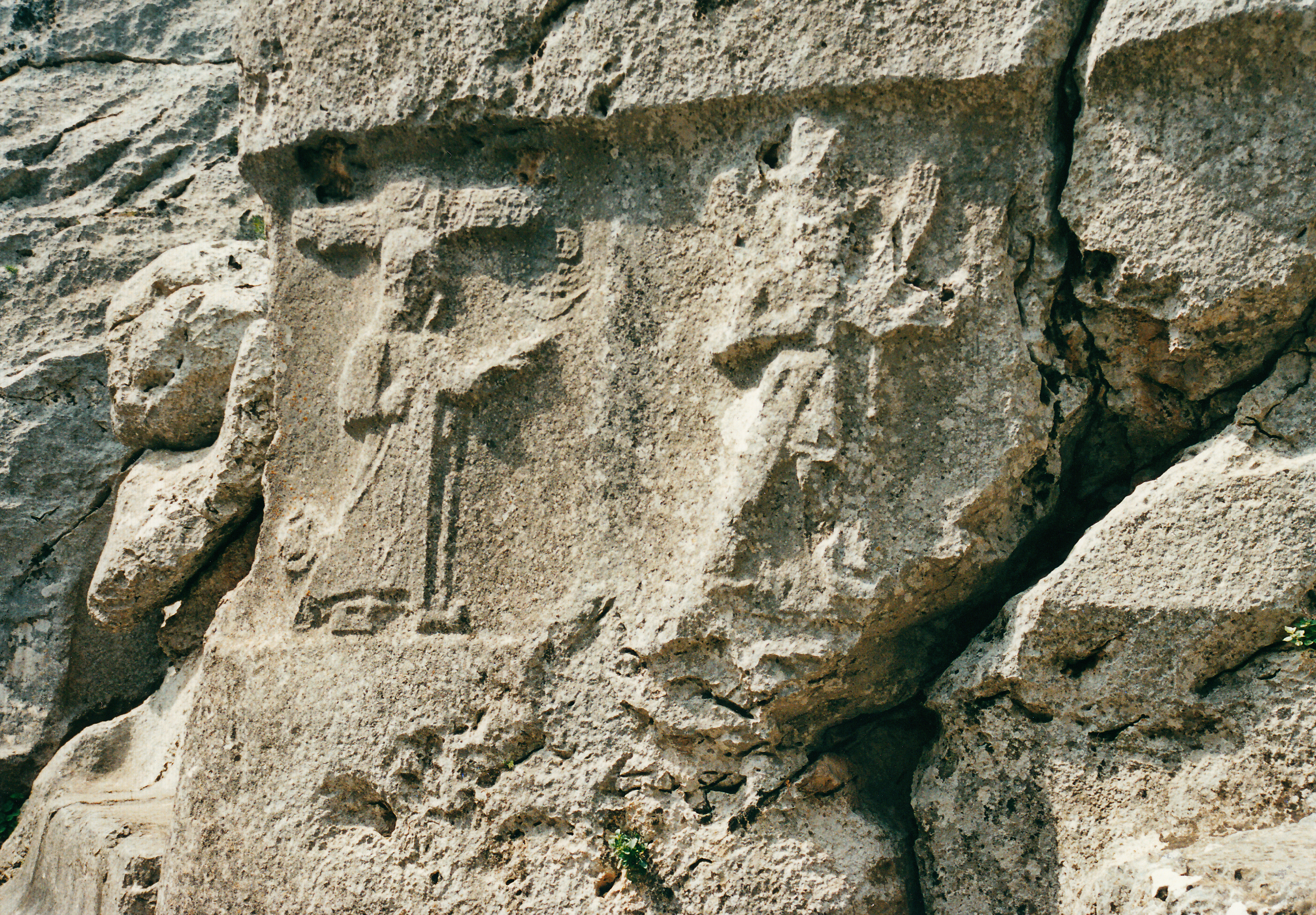
Kušuḫ, followed by Šimige, as depicted in Yazılıkaya.

Kušuḫ was incorporated into the Hittite pantheon alongside other Hurrian deities. He is among the members of the Hurrian pantheon depicted in the Yazılıkaya sanctuary, where he is placed between Šauška's handmaidens Ninatta and Kulitta and the sun god Šimige in the procession of deities following Teššub. Hurrian deities, such as Kušuḫ, commonly appear in theophoric names of rulers in areas under Hittite influence. For example, Hittite prince Piyaššili after being appointed the king of Carchemish by his father Šuppiluliuma I took the regnal name Šarri-Kušuḫ, "Kušuḫ is (my) king."

The name Umbu is attested in Hurro-Hittite context too: examples include oath formulas, where he paired with Šarruma, and texts pertaining the išuwa festival. As a pair, Umbu and Nikkal appear in the entourage of Ḫepat in offering lists.

== Mythology ==
While Kušuḫ appears in Hurrian myths, according to Gernot Wilhelm they do not provide much information about his individual character. In a cycle of myths focused on the conflict between Kumarbi and Teššub, the so-called Kumarbi Cycle, he belongs to the group of allies of the weather god. He is mentioned in the Song of Silver, presumed to be a part of the aforementioned cycle. The eponymous antagonist, Silver, a son of Kumarbi and a mortal woman, who seemingly temporarily becomes the ruler of the gods, at one point brings Kušuḫ and the sun god Šimige down from heaven, and apparently intends to kill them. They bow down to him and ask to be released, arguing that otherwise Silver will have to rule in complete darkness. The conclusion of the composition is not preserved. Kušuḫ is also mentioned briefly in another myth dealing with the same conflict, the Song of Ullikummi, where Kumarbi states that he has to hide the eponymous stone monster somewhere where the allies of Teššub, including the moon god, will not be able to find him while he continues to grow. Additionally, he plays a role in the tale of Kešši (CTH 361).

It is sometimes assumed that the Ugaritic myth about the marriage of the local moon god Yarikh and Nikkal (KTU 1.24) had Hurrian origin, and according to Nicolas Wyatt it is possible that in a hitherto unknown earlier version the protagonist was Kušuḫ instead. Researchers do not agree if the Ugaritic text was a direct translation, as assumed for example by Aicha Rahmouni, or only an adaptation of motifs from Hurrian mythology. It is also unclear if the proposed Hurrian version was in turn based on an unknown Mesopotamian myth, or if the Ugaritic text was independently influenced by Mesopotamian tradition.
