= Ningal =

Mesopotamian goddess

- Tutelary goddess of Ur
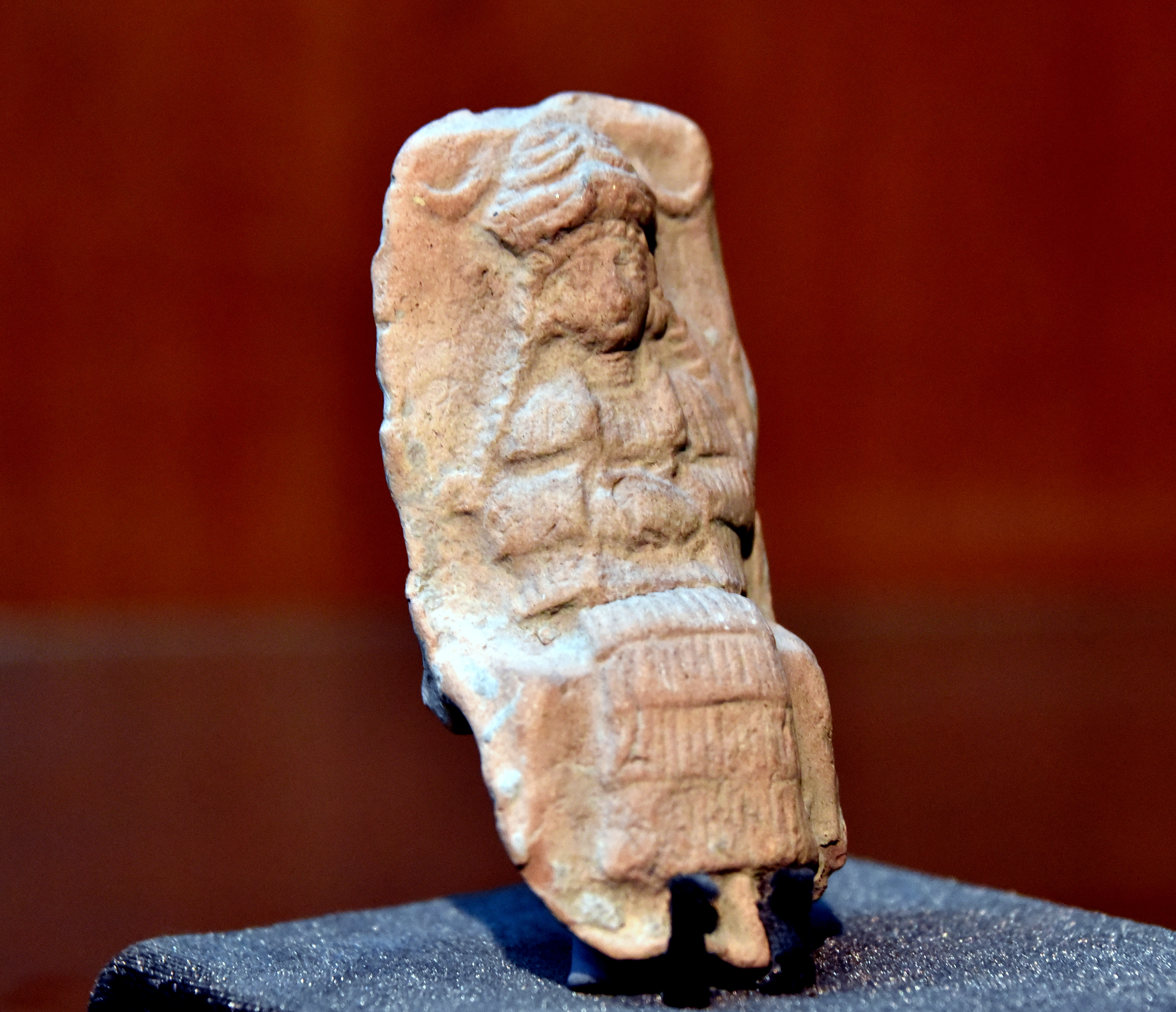
- Old Babylonian fired clay plaque from Ur on display in the Sulaymaniyah Museum in Iraq depicting a goddess accompanied by Nanna’s symbol, the lunar crescent. It has been proposed that depictions of a seated goddess accompanied by a symbolic representation of Nanna might be Ningal.
- Major cult center: Ur, Harran

Genealogy
- Parents: Ningikuga and Enki
- Consort: Nanna/Sin
- Children: Utu/Shamash and Inanna/Ishtar; Amarra-uzu and Amarra-he'ea; Ningublaga; Numushda; Manzat (according to Maqlû); Pinikir (in a Hurrian source); Nuska (in late sources from Harran)

Equivalents
- Hurrian: Nikkal

Ningal (written 𒀭𒊩𒌆𒃲, ^{d}NIN.GAL; in Sumerian: "Great Queen"; in Akkadian: Nikkal) was a Mesopotamian goddess regarded as the wife of the moon god, Nanna/Sin. She was particularly closely associated with his main cult centers, Ur and Harran, but they were also worshiped together in other cities of Mesopotamia. She was particularly venerated by the Third Dynasty of Ur and later by kings of Larsa.

== Character and iconography ==
Ningal's name has Sumerian origin and can be translated as "Great Queen". While she was a major deity in the Mesopotamian pantheon and the worship of her is attested from all periods of history of Mesopotamia, her character was largely "passive and supportive" according to Joan Goodnick Westenholz. She was the tutelary deity of Ur. She shared it with her husband Nanna (Akkadian Sin). She was referred to as the "lady" (NIN; Early Dynastic sources) or "mother" (AMA; Ur III sources) of Ur. She and the city could be compared to a mother and her child in literary texts. She was portrayed mourning over it in laments, such as Lament for Ur or Lament for Sumer and Ur.

Based on some of Ningal's epithets it has additionally been proposed that she was in part an astral deity, much like her husband. This aspect might have been reflected in titles such as Ninantagal, Ninmulnunna, Si-iminbi and possibly Kalkal, respectively "high lady", "lady, star of the prince", "sevenfold light" and "treasured".

Ningal's iconography was not consistent. It has been proposed that she could be represented as a seated goddess accompanied by the lunar crescent, a symbol of her husband. A type of bird, u_{5}-bi_{2}, was possibly associated with her, though the evidence is inconclusive. Proposed identities of this animal include the greylag goose and the whooper swan, but it is assumed that even in Ur, statues of a goddess accompanied by a water bird of the genus Anserini, well known from excavations, were more likely to represent Nanshe. Ningal was also called zirru, a term which might designate a female bird. Some en priestesses of Nanna, especially Sargon's daughter Enheduanna, were also referred to as zirru. On the Ur-Nammu Stele, Ningal is depicted sitting in her husband's lap. This type of depictions was meant to display the intimate nature of the connection between the deities and highlight their ability to act in unison, and is also attested for Bau and Ningirsu.

In medical treatises the term "hand of Ningal" referred to an unidentified skin disease; analogous names of diseases are attested for various other deities, for example Sin, Adad, Shamash and Geshtinanna.

== Association with other deities ==
Ningal's mother was Ningikuga (Sumerian: "lady of the pure reed"), as attested in a balbale composition and in an emesal love song. This goddess could be identified as a consort of Enki. The god list An = Anum identifies her with Damkina directly, though in its Old Babylonian forerunner she is a separate deity in the circle of Enki. Ningikuga could also instead function as the name of a manifestation of Ningal, addressed as "the pure one who purifies the earth".

The lunar god Nanna (Akkadian Sin) was regarded as Ningal's husband. Her role as his wife is the best attested aspect of her character. Some of her epithets underlined her connection to him, for example Ḫegalnunna ("wealth of the prince"). A derivative of Ningal were regarded as married to other moon gods in Hurrian (Kušuḫ or Umbu), Hittite (Arma) and Ugaritic (Yarikh) sources. In all of the corresponding languages her name was rendered as Nikkal, similarly as in Akkadian. The best attested children of Ningal and Nanna were Inanna (Ishtar), who represented Venus, and Utu (Shamash), who represented the sun. The view that Inanna was a daughter of Nanna and Ningal is the most commonly attested tradition regarding her parentage. The poem Agushaya refers to Inanna as Ningal's firstborn child. Due to her identification with Ishtar, the Hurrian and Elamite goddess Pinikir is referred to as a daughter of Sin and Ningal in a text written in Akkadian but found in a corpus of Hurro-Hittite rituals. Further relatively commonly attested children of Ningal and Nanna include the goddesses Amarra-uzu and Amarra-he'ea, known from An = Anum, Ningublaga (the city god of Ki'abrig) and Numushda (the city god of Kazallu). In Neo-Assyrian sources from Harran Nuska was regarded as the son of Ningal and her husband. In a Maqlû incantation, Manzat (Akkadian and Elamite goddess of the rainbow) appears as the sister of Shamash, and by extension as daughter of his parents, Ningal and her husband.

An = Anum indicates that Ningal was believed to have a sukkal (attendant deity), though the reading of their name, ^{d}ME^{kà-kà}ME, remains uncertain. Richard L. Litke argued that the gloss is unlikely to point at an otherwise unknown pronunciation of the sign ME, and assumed that the deity in mention was named Meme, while an alternate version of the list had the name Kakka in the same line instead. Manfred Krebernik proposes that this deity is identical with the divine messenger Kakka. Litke instead concluded that in this case Kakka should be understood as a deity elsewhere equated with Ninkarrak, distinct from the messenger god. A medicine goddess named Kakka, associated with Ninkarrak and Ninshubur, is attested in sources from Mari.

An association between Ningal and Ninshubur is documented in the Early Dynastic god list from Abu Salabikh. In the Old Babylonian period Nanshe was incorporated into the circle of deities associated with her in Ur, though she is overall sparsely attested in sources from this city. It is possible that the deity Nin-é.NIM.ma, best attested in texts from Larsa and the Sealand, was associated with Ningal as a member of her entourage starting in the time of Kudur-Mabuk and his ruler sons, though it has also been proposed that this name was her epithet.

== Worship ==
Ningal is first attested the god lists from Early Dynastic Fara and Abu Salabikh. She is also mentioned in the Zame Hymns (from za_{3}-me, "praise"), where she appears after Nanna as "mother Ningal" (ama Ningal).

=== Ur ===
A temple dedicated to Ningal was located in Ur, and could be referred with the ceremonial Sumerian names Egarku and Agrunku ("house, sacred boudoir"). In the earliest texts from this city, she is only attested in two theophoric names, but by the Ur III period she came to be invoked in them commonly. The Ur-Nammu Stele indicates that she was likely the highest ranked goddess in the local pantheon during his reign. A limestone bowl dedicated to Ningal by Ur-Nammu's daughter En-nirgal-ana, who served as the en priestess of Nanna, has also been discovered. Shulgi referred to Ningal as his mother. He also rebuilt the temple of Nanna in Ga’esh, Ekarzida ("house, pure quay") as a temple of Ningal in which she was known by the epithet Nin-Urimma, "lady of Ur".

The veneration of Ningal in Ur is well documented in sources from the Old Babylonian period as well. Anette Zgoll argues that her cultic importance increased compared to the preceding Ur III period. Shu-Ilishu of Isin mentions Ningal in a curse formula in an inscription found in Ur commemorating the recovery of the statue of Nanna from Anshan. Iddin-Dagan referred to himself as the "beloved of Nanna and Ningal". En-ana-tuma, en priestess of Nanna and daughter of Ishme-Dagan, dedicated a statue to Ningal. Kings of Larsa, especially Warad-Sin and Rim-Sîn I, considered Ur a city of particular religious and political importance and were active worshipers of Ningal. Sources from this period indicate that her temple was combined with the Gipar, the residence of the en priestess of Nanna, into a single complex. The ceremonial name Egarku was retained for her major sanctuary within it, and appears in inscriptions of kings such as Nur-Adad and Warad-Sin. Another shrine dedicated to her in the Gipar was Eidlurugukalamma ("house of the river ordeal of the land"), rebuilt by Silli-Adad. The work continued under the reign of his successor Warad-Sin. Sin-Iddinam mentions Ningal alongside Nanna in an inscription dealing with the construction of the walls of Ur.

In the Kassite period, Kurigalzu I built another temple of Ningal in Ur, but its name is presently unknown.

Ningal was still worshiped in Ur during the Neo-Babylonian period. Her main temple there was rebuilt by Nabonidus. Additionally a bīt ḫilṣi ("house of pressing"), assumed to be a pharmacy accompanied by a garden where the ingredients for various medicines were grown) located in the same city in this period was associated with Ningal.

=== Harran ===
In Harran Ningal was worshiped in a shrine known under the name giparu. Andrew R. George assumes it was located in the Eḫulḫul, the temple of Sin located in this city. It is attested in sources from the reign of Ashurbanipal. An inscription of this king states that Ningal and Nanna crowned him in Harran. According to inscriptions of Nabonidus, during the repairs undertaken at his orders in the Eḫulḫul the temple was provided with refurbished statues of its divine inhabitants, including Sin, Ningal, Nuska and Sadarnunna.

Harran most likely influenced the Aramaic center of the cult of Ningal, known from sources from the first millennium BCE, Nereb (Al-Nayrab) located in the proximity of Aleppo.

=== Other cities ===
Offerings to Ningal are mentioned in texts from Nippur from the Ur III period. According to the so-called Nippur Compendium, she was worshiped in this city in the local temple of Nanna, as well as in a sanctuary referred to as bīt dalīli ("house of praise") alongside Nisaba, Kusu, Shamash and Bēl-ālīya. A seal inscription from the Kassite period mentions"Ningal of Nippur" alongside the local goddess Ninimma.

From lower Mesopotamia Ningal was introduced to Mari, where she was already known in the Ur III period. In an early offering list she appears after Belet-ekallim and Lugal-Terqa ("lord of Terqa"). One masculine and one feminine theophoric name invoking her have been identified in Old Babylonian sources from this city.

A document from Old Babylonian Sippar mentions that statues of Ningal and Nanna were used as witnesses of a transaction. They were also invoked together on cylinder seal inscriptions from this city from the same period, though not as commonly as Shamash and Aya or Adad and Shala.

References to veneration of Ningal in the Old Babylonian period are also available from multiple other cities, including Babylon, Isin, Kisurra, Larsa, Tutub and Urum. A joint cult center of Ningal and her husband whose location is uncertain was also patronized by kings of the Manana Dynasty near Kish.

A single attestation of Ningal is known from the archive of the First Sealand dynasty. She occurs in this context as a recipient of offerings alongside Nanna. A settlement named after her, Quppat-Ningal, is also attested a handful of times in this text corpus, for example in a letter of an official named Nūr-Bau, presumably addressed to king Pešgaldarameš or his successor Ayadaragalama.

The Canonical Temple List, which dates to the Kassite period, lists two temples of Ningal whose location remains unknown, Eangim ("house like heaven") and Eengimkuga ("house pure like heaven").

One of the inscriptions of the Assyrian king Esarhaddon commemorates the construction of a temple dedicated jointly to Ningal, Sin, Shamash and Aya in Nineveh. A shrine dedicated to her was also located in Dur-Sharrukin, a new royal city constructed during the reign of Sargon II. It was located within his palace. The king implored her in an inscription to intercede with her husband to grant him a long life and to guarantee his successors will continue to rule over "every inhabited region forever". Ningal is also attested in a number of theophoric names from Assyria.

Letters from the reign of Ashurbanipal indicate that Ningal and her husband replaced Inanna and Dumuzi as the tutelary deities of Kissig in late periods. Nabonidus restored a temple of Ningal bearing the ceremonial name Eamaškuga ("house, pure sheepfold") in this city, which according to Andrew R. George might be identical with Eamašku, attested in association with Inanna in earlier literary texts, including Inanna's Descent. This event is commemorated by an inscription on a poorly preserved cylinder dated to 546 BCE discovered during excavations in Tell al-Lahm, which might be the site of Kissik. The king asked Ningal to intercede with her husband on his behalf in it.

Ningal was also worshiped in Uruk in the Seleucid period. However, the attestations are limited to a single source, the ritual text K 7353, which shows astrological influence, but ultimately remains obscure. She is absent from earlier Neo-Babylonian sources and according to Julia Krul presumably was incorporated into the local pantheon due to her status as the wife of Sin, similarly to other spouses, children and servants of locally venerated deities who first appear in Uruk in Seleucid sources.

=== Outside Mesopotamia ===
The cult of Ningal spread from Mesopotamia to other areas, including Hurrian kingdoms such as Kizzuwatna, as well as Ugarit and the Hittite Empire, where she developed into Nikkal. In Ugarit, where she could be referred to as Nikkal-wa-Ib, she belonged both to the Ugaritic and Hurrian pantheons of the city, and is attested as the wife of both local moon god Yarikh and his Hurrian counterpart Kušuḫ. In an Ugaritic myth she is associated with an otherwise unknown god Ḫrḫb, who was possibly regarded as her father and most likely originated in Hurrian tradition. Non-Hurrian non-Ugaritic attestations of Nikkal from areas where West Semitic languages were spoken in the second and first millennia BCE are very infrequent, though it might be the result of preservation bias. According to Gina Konstantopoulos, the distinct western form of Ningal might be mentioned in the treaty between Ashur-nirari V and Mati-ilu of Arpad.

In the east Ningal is attested in Akkadian theophoric names from Susa in Elam, with the oldest examples occurring in sources from the Sargonic period. Additionally, a chapel dedicated to her was maintained there by an Akkadian-speaking family, possibly originally brought to the city as prisoners of war after the Elamite conquest of Ur. They maintained it over the course of four generations.

In Egypt Ningal (or Nikkal) is only attested once, in a single magical papyrus, in which she appears as a foreign deity implored to heal a disease.
