= Keilalphabetische Texte aus Ugarit =

Keilalphabetische Texte aus Ugarit or Keilschrifttexte aus Ugarit, abbreviated KTU, is the standard source reference collection for the cuneiform texts from Ugarit. The German names for this collection literally mean "Wedge-Alphabetical Texts from Ugarit" and "Cuneiform Texts from Ugarit" (Keil is German for "wedge", alphabetische for "alphabetical", Schrift for "writing", Texte for "texts", aus for "from".)

The editors include Manfried Dietrich (born in Yuanjiang, China, 6 Nov. 1935) of the University of Münster Institut für Altorientalische Philologie, Oswald Loretz, and Joaquín Sanmartín of the University of Barcelona.

The abbreviation is usually used according to the German, KTU³ with ³ indicating the third edition: Dietrich, Loretz, and Sanmartin. The Cuneiform Alphabetic Texts from Ugarit, Ras Ibn Hani and Other Places. Münster 2013. Occasionally the abbreviation CAT is also used for the second edition, though this is less common.

The KTU cataloguing system overlaps with two earlier systems:

- UT - Cyrus Gordon Ugaritic textbook Rome (1965)
- CTA - Andrée Herdner Corpus tablettes alphabetiques Paris (1963)

== Order and abbreviations ==
The numbering system provides that inscription 2.100 is the hundredth inscription in genre 2, following inscription 2.99 and preceding 2.101.

- EN: Excavation no.
- Fd: Find-spot
- Mu: Museum no.
- Co: Copy/copies
- Tr: Transliteration
- Ph: Photograph
- SR: Special Remarks
- Ge: Genre
- Bi: Bibliography

== See also ==
- Keilschrifttexte aus Assur religiösen Inhalts
- Patrologia Graeca
- Synodicon orientale
