= Lydian religion =

Ancient religion in Iron Age Anatolia

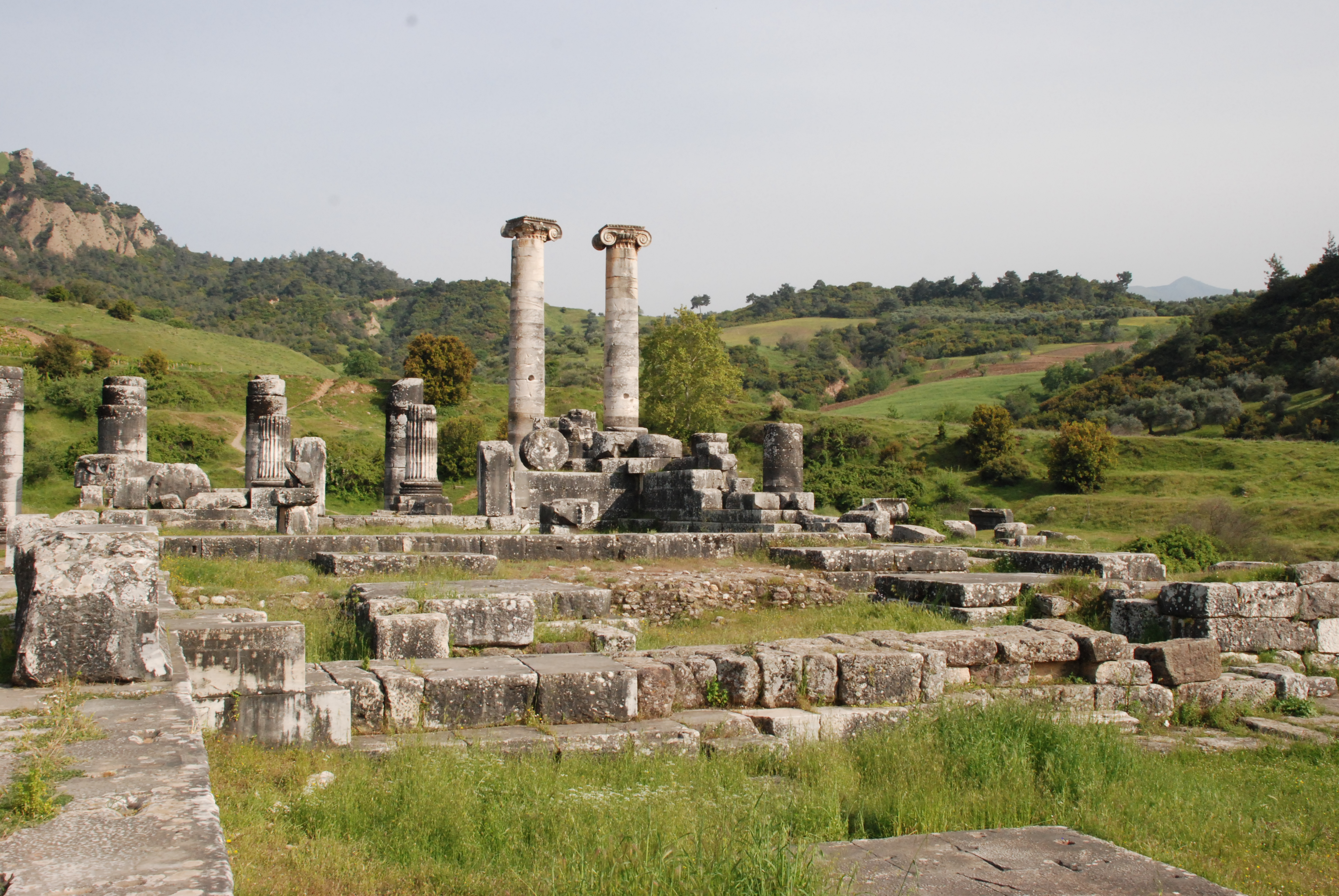
The temple of Artemis in Sardis, capital of Lydia

The Lydian religion refers to the mythology, ritual practices and beliefs of the Lydians, an ancient people of Iron Age Anatolia.

Based on limited evidence, Lydian religious practices were centred around the fertility of nature, as was common among ancient societies which depended on the successful cultivation of land.

== Sources ==
The Lydian religion is marginally attested due to the known sources covering it being largely of Greek origin, while Lydian inscriptions regarding religion are small in number and no Lydian corpus of ritual texts like the Hittite ritual tablets have been recovered.

== Development ==
The early Lydian religion exhibited strong connections to Anatolian as well as Greek traditions.

Although Lydia had been conquered by the Persian Achaemenid Empire in c. 547 BC, native Lydian traditions were not destroyed by Persian rule, and most Lydian inscriptions were written during this period.

Despite the small size of the recorded Lydian corpus, the various inscriptions relating to religion date from c. 650 to c. 330-325 BC, thus covering the period beginning with the establishment of the Mermnad dynasty under Gyges and ending with the aftermath of the Macedonian conquest under Alexander the Great and the beginning of the Hellenistic period.

== Pantheon ==
The Lydian pantheon was polytheistic, and was composed of:

- native Lydian deities who were reflexes of earlier Aegean-Balkan ones,
- as well as Anatolian deities.

=== Native deities ===
==== Artimus ====
Unlike traditionally Anatolian pantheons but similarly to the Phrygian one, the Lydian pantheon was headed by the goddess Artimus (Lydian: 𐤠𐤭𐤯𐤦𐤪𐤰𐤮), who is the most well-attested Lydian deity both in the Lydian corpus and archaeologically.

Artimus was a deity of wild nature, and was also the Lydian variant of an earlier Aegean-Balkan goddess whose other reflexes included the Greek Artemis (Ἄρτεμις) and the Phrygian Artimis. Being the main goddess of the Lydians, Artimus had a similar role to the Phrygian Matar Kubeleya and she possessed the features of the latter Mother goddess well as of a potnia thērōn ('The Lady of Animals').

Artimus was the mother of the goddess Kufaws, as is visible from the depiction of her larger figure side by side with the smaller figure of Kufaws in a daughter-mother pairing in a c. 400 BC naiskos from Sardis.

Artimus was also a protector of the dead, and she was invoked to protect grave monuments and punish offenders, with her altar being oriented towards the necropolis hill in the western direction representing this role of this goddess.

According to Greek records, the Mermnad kings of Lydia, especially Croesus, were closely connected to the cult of Artimus.

===== Hypostases =====
The cult of at least three hypostases of Artimus are attested in Lydia:

- Artimus of Ephesus (Lydian: 𐤠𐤭𐤯𐤦𐤪𐤰𐤮 𐤦𐤡𐤮𐤦𐤪𐤳𐤦𐤳, romanized: Artimus Ipsimšiš)
- Artimus of the Sardians (Lydian: 𐤠𐤭𐤯𐤦𐤪𐤰𐤮 𐤮𐤱𐤠𐤭𐤣𐤠𐤸, romanized: Artimus Sfardañ)
- Artimus of Koloē (Lydian: 𐤠𐤭𐤯𐤦𐤪𐤰𐤮 𐤨𐤰𐤩𐤰𐤪𐤳𐤦𐤳, romanized: Artimus Kulumšiš).

These three hypostases of Artimus were invoked together, showing that they were both distinct from and closely associated with each other.

Additional epithets of Artimus are also attested, but their meanings are still unknown:

- aspluwa- (Lydian: 𐤠𐤮𐤡𐤩𐤰𐤥𐤠-), possibly meaning lit. 'of Sipylus';
- caqrla- (Lydian: 𐤹𐤠𐤲𐤭𐤩𐤠-);
- astrko- (Lydian: 𐤠𐤮𐤯𐤭𐤨𐤬-), meaning lit. 'Lady'.

Ephesian Greeks might have founded the cult of Artimus of Ephesus at Sardis, attesting of a complex connection between Lydian and ancient Greek cults. Whether the cults of Artimus of the Sardians and Artimus of Koloē were founded as a result of that of Artimus of Ephesus is still unknown due to lack of evidence.

===== Iconography =====
Artimus was depicted using similar iconography as the Phrygian goddess Matar Kubeleya.

On the naiskos from Sardis dating to c. 400 BC, Artimus holds a deer while Kufaws holds a lion, thus attesting that the sacred animal of Artimus was the stag.

==== Qaλdãns ====
===== Identification =====
The identity of the figure of Qaλdãns or Qaλiyãns (Lydian: 𐤲𐤷𐤣𐤵𐤫𐤮) is still uncertain, and has been variously interpreted as:

- the Lydian king of the gods;
- a Moon-god who was the main masculine deity of the Lydian pantheon and the consort of Artimus, in which case the Lydians shared this cult of a masculine lunar deity with the Phrygians, who worshipped the Moon-god Mas.
- the Lydian equivalent of the Greek god Apollo (Ἀπόλλων), whose cult has been suggested to have existed in Lydia based on the attestation of the king Croesus having made offerings to the sanctuaries of Apollo at Delphi and at Didyma, as well as the Greek accounts of the Persian conquest of Sardis linking the fate of Croesus to this god.
  - However, Apollo is still unattested in Lydia, and it is unknown whether there was any native cult of this god in Lydia or whether Lydian kings merely supported the cult of Apollo abroad without importing his cult into Lydia proper; whether this lack of attestation is due to the small size of known Lydian inscriptions or an absence of this deity in Lydia is also uncertain.
- a high status or royal title.

This figure is mentioned in two inscriptions, where his name always appears before that of Artimus. He is invoked along with Artimus in protective curse formulae in both inscriptions, and figures as the receiver of a temenos dedicated to "mighty Qaλdãns and Artimus of Ephesus" (Lydian: 𐤲𐤷𐤣𐤵𐤫𐤮 𐤯𐤠𐤥𐤮𐤠𐤮 𐤠𐤭𐤯𐤦𐤪𐤰𐤨 𐤦𐤡𐤮𐤦𐤪𐤳𐤦𐤳, romanized: Qaλdãns tawsas Artimu(s)=k Ipsimšiš) in the second inscription. The role of Qaλdãns in both inscriptions can fit either interpretation of him being a human, possibly a deified a ruler or a religious official with a high status, or a deity.

The goddess Artimus is herself invoked again alone within the temenos inscription, and never alongside Qaλdãns/Qaλiyãns in another inscription, implying that she held a higher status than him within the Lydian pantheon.

===== Etymology =====
The etymology of the name Qaλdãns/Qaλiyãns is still uncertain, and several hypotheses have been put forward for it:

- it has been tentatively suggested to be from Luwian kuwalan-, meaning lit. 'army', possibly linked to the role of the Greek Apollo as an archer god;
- alternatively, it might have meant lit. 'king':
  - the title Qaλdãns would have found a parallel with the use of the Lycian name Xñtawati Xbidẽñni (𐊜𐊑𐊗𐊀𐊇𐊀𐊗𐊆 𐊜𐊂𐊆𐊅𐊚𐊑𐊏𐊆), meaning lit. 'King of Kaunos', referring to a Carian deity who also shared a temenos with the goddess Ertemi, that is Artimus;
    - this use of a title as a theonym might be supported by the parallel between the Lydian coin legend Mλitτiš Qλdãnl=im (𐤪𐤷𐤦𐤯𐤴𐤦𐤳 𐤲𐤷𐤣𐤵𐤫𐤩𐤦𐤪), meaning lit. 'I belong to the King of Miletus', which would find a counterpart in the Lycian coin legend Xeriga Wehñtezi (𐊜𐊁𐊕𐊆𐊄𐊀 𐊇𐊁𐊛𐊑𐊗𐊁𐊈𐊆), meaning lit. 'Gergis of Phellos'.

==== Lews ====
Lews (Lydian: 𐤩𐤤𐤥𐤮) or Lefs (Lydian: 𐤩𐤤𐤱𐤮) was the Lydian equivalent of the Greek god Zeus (Ζεύς) and the Phrygian god Tiws.

Unlike the Anatolian storm-god Tarḫuntas, Lews held a less prominent role in the Lydian religion, although his role as the bringer of rain followed the tradition surrounding the Anatolian Tarḫuntas.

Lydian inscriptions referring to this god as Lews the Protector (Lydian: 𐤩𐤤𐤥𐤮 𐤳𐤠𐤭𐤶𐤯𐤠𐤮, romanized: Lews Šarẽtas) attest of his role as a protector of graves.

There is no information regarding the position of Lews in the Lydian pantheon or his cult, and sanctuaries of Lews have not yet been found, although one might have existed near the market of Sardis, where a dedication to him was discovered.

A connection between the Lydian Lews and the Greek Zeus is visible in how Greek mythology linked the latter to Lydia, more specifically to the site of Mount Tmolus to the west of Sardis.

==== Lamẽtrus ====
The goddess Lamẽtrus (Lydian: 𐤩𐤠𐤪𐤶𐤯𐤭𐤰𐤮) was, likewise, the Lydian reflex of an earlier Aegean-Balkan goddess whose Greek iteration was Dēmētēr (Δημήτηρ).

==== Pakiš ====
The frenzy god Pakiš (Lydian: 𐤡𐤠𐤨𐤦𐤳) to whom was performed an orgiastic cult was also a Lydian variant of an older Aegean-Balkan god whose Greek reflex was Bakkhos (Βάκχος).

Lydian texts or archaeological remains provide no significant information on Pakiš, although his presence in theophoric names such as Pakiwas (𐤡𐤠𐤨𐤦𐤥𐤠𐤮) suggests that he was seen positively in Lydia.

The Lydian calendar's month of Pakillλ (𐤡𐤠𐤨𐤦𐤩𐤩𐤷), which likely corresponded with the part of autumn when grapes were harvested, was named after Pakiš.

Although the Greek cognate of Pakiš, Bakkhos, was himself a Greek god already attested during the Mycenaean period, later Greek myth connected him to Lydia, likely due to the Greeks viewing this region as a famous site of wine production.

Therefore, Greek myth depicted Bakkhos as having grown up there, where he was raised by the Anatolian mother goddess Meter Hipta, that is the Hurrian goddess Hepat.

==== Kufaws ====
The goddess Kufaws (Lydian: 𐤨𐤰𐤱𐤠𐤥𐤮) or Kuwaws (Lydian: 𐤨𐤰𐤥𐤠𐤥𐤮), from an earlier *Kufawus (𐤨𐤰𐤱𐤠𐤥𐤰𐤮*) and referred by the Greeks as Kubēbē (Κυβήβη), was a prominent Lydian deity possessing an important temple in Sardis.

Kufaws was a young goddess of divine frenzy, being thus the feminine counterpart of Pakiš, due to which Greek sources therefore sometimes identified her with Artemis because Kufaws shared some features with her, although Kufaws was herself not identical with Artemis.

Kufaws was instead the daughter of the Lydian Mother Goddess Artimus, as is visible from her depiction side by side with Artimus in a daughter-mother pairing in a c. 400 BC naiskos from Sardis, where the larger figure of Artimus holds a deer while the smaller figure of Kufaws holds a lion.

The prominence of Kufaws in the Lydian religion is also visible in how the Persians destroyed Greek temples as retaliation for the Greeks having burnt down her temple in Sardis during the Ionian Revolt.

An altar of Kufaws was present in the gold-refining district of Sardis, attesting of her role as the protector of the Lydian gold and silver industry.

===== Aegean origins =====
Similarly to the relation between the Lydian Artimus and the Greek Artemis, Kufaws was the Lydian reflex of an earlier goddess whose Phrygian variant was the Mother goddess Kubeleya.

===== Anatolian influence =====
Despite having Aegean-Balkan origins and not being derived from the Anatolian goddess Kubaba (𔖶𔖖𔗎𔗏𔗜𔒚𔕸𔕸𔗔𔖶), Kufaws was nonetheless influenced by this deity, as can be seen by her appearance in a curse formula on a tomb, reading:

Lydian text

𐤱𐤠𐤨𐤪𐤷 𐤮𐤵𐤫𐤯𐤠𐤮
𐤨𐤰𐤱𐤠𐤥𐤨 𐤪𐤠𐤭𐤦𐤥𐤣𐤠𐤨
𐤶𐤫𐤳𐤷𐤦𐤡𐤦𐤣

Transliteration

fak=mλ Sãntas
Kufaw(s)=k Mariwda(š)=k
ẽnšλip[id]

Translation

To him, Sãntas
and Kufaws and the Dark Gods
shall do harm

This mention finds parallels in Hieroglyphic Luwian inscriptions from Tabal, where the goddess Kubaba, the god Šandas and the Marwainzi were associated to each other as deities who harmed evil-doers.

===== Iconography =====
Known depictions of Kufaws include:

- a marble statuette where she wears a crown similar to that of Kubaba of Karkamiš but without a horn;
- a depiction of Kufaws at the entrance of a model of her temple;
- and a marble fragment of a sculpture of Kufaws at the entrance of another temple where she holds a snake in her right hand.

Also reflecting the influence of Kubaba is the association of Kufaws with felines: as it had been for Kubaba, the lion was the sacred animal of the Lydian Kufaws as well, and was also the symbol of the Lydian royal dynasty, as attested by the imagery of lions on the coinage of the Lydian Empire and the use of the element walwi-, meaning lit. 'lion' in the name of the Lydian king Alyattes (Lydian: 𐤥𐤠𐤩𐤥𐤤𐤯𐤤𐤮, romanized: Walwetes).

==== Korē ====
The existence of the goddess Korē (Κόρη) is not recorded during the period of Lydian independence or from any Lydian language source, hence why nothing is known about her worship during the Lydian Empire. She was however later attested during the Hellenistic and Roman periods, when she was assimilated with the Greek goddess Persephonē.

Korē appears to have had some vegetative aspects, and the festival of Khrysanthina (Χρυσάνθινα) was celebrated at Sardis in her honour during the Hellenistic Period.

=== Anatolian deities ===
Also present in the Lydian religion were deities of Anatolian origin, who held secondary roles to the Lydian deities.

==== Sãntas ====
Anatolian deities in the Lydian pantheon included the god Sãntas (Lydian: 𐤮𐤵𐤫𐤯𐤠𐤮), who might have been the consort of Kufaws, but whose nature is still uncertain.

While this god's name corresponds to that of the Luwian Šandas (𔖶𔖖𔗎𔗏𔑶𔑯𔗔𔖶), he might instead have been more similar to that of the ancient Greek hero Hēraklēs, whom Greek sources recorded was worshipped in Lydia.

The association of Sãntas with the goddess Kufaws and the Mariwdas (Dark Gods) finds parallels in Hieroglyphic Luwian inscriptions from Tabal, where the god Šandas was associated with the Marwainzi and the goddess Kubaba as deities who harmed evil-doers.

The name of the god Sãntas appeared as a theophoric element in personal names, such as in that of an advisor of the king Croesus who was named Sandanis (Σάνδανις).

==== Mariwdas ====
Accompanying Sãntas were several lesser demon-like figures called the Mariwdas or Mariwyas (Lydian: 𐤪𐤠𐤭𐤦𐤥𐤣𐤠𐤮).

The Mariwdas were the Lydian equivalent of the deities attested in Hieroglyphic Luwian inscriptions as the Dark Gods (Hieroglyphic Luwian: 𔖖𔗎𔗏𔘅𔖱𔗬𔓯𔖩𔓯𔖶, romanized: Marwainzi).

==== Maλiš ====
Another Anatolian deity present in the Lydian pantheon was the goddess Maλiš (Lydian: 𐤪𐤠𐤷𐤦𐤳), who corresponded to the Anatolian goddess Maliya, attested in Hittite as ᴰMāliya (𒀭𒈠𒀀𒇷𒅀) and Lycian as Malija (𐊎𐊀𐊍𐊆𐊊𐊀), and the Greek goddess Athena.

Maλiš possessed a vegetative aspect, being a goddess of vegetation, especially of wine and corn.

According to Ancient Greek sources, the Lydian kings sponsored the cult of the goddess "Athena", that is of Maλiš.

The goddess Maλiš was referred to in the Greek fragmentary line from the island of Lesbos reading "holding her spindle, Maλiš spun a fine thread" (Μᾶλις μεν ἐννη λεπτὸν ἐχοισ ̓ επ ̓ ἀτράκτω λίνον, Mâlis men ennē leptòn ekhois ep atráktō línon).

===== Identification with Athena =====
A bilingual dedication on a column drum at a Pergamene temple of Athena also equated the Lydian goddess Maλiš with the Greek goddess Athena.

A Greek text of the myth of Arachne also called the goddess Athena by the name Malis, thus showing that the cult of Maλiš had passed into the Greek milieu.

===== Iconography =====
A small ivory statuette of a spinning woman wearing a Lydian headgear might have depicted Maλiš.

==== Other deities ====
Other deities which might have existed in Lydia include:

- Armãs (Lydian: 𐤠𐤭𐤪𐤵𐤮), as attested in the theophoric name Armãwas (𐤠𐤭𐤪𐤵𐤥𐤠𐤮), corresponded to the Luwian Moon-god Armas (Hieroglyphic Luwian: 𔖶𔖖𔗎𔗏𔓜𔖻𔒅𔗔𔖶).
- Tiwdas (Lydian: 𐤯𐤦𐤥𐤣𐤠𐤮), also attested from a theophoric name, corresponded to the Anatolian Sun-god Tiwadas (Hieroglyphic Luwian: 𔖶𔖖𔗎𔗏𔓚𔗬𔑰𔗔𔖶).

== Cult ==
Due to lack of evidence, little is known on the organisation of Lydian cults.

However, the existence of multiple distinct hypostases of Artimus with their own local cults, as well as sanctuaries dedicated to multiple deities are attested.

=== Sanctuaries ===
Lydian cultic spaces ranged from small places of worship to prestigious temples of the state cult which also had a political role, although the evidence for them dates from after the end of Lydian independence, while those from the Lydian empire are primarily known from Greek literature rather than from archaeological evidence.

Due to the meagre evidence for Lydian religious spaces, little is known about their shapes, sizes, administration, and location.

Remains of a looted building from the acropolis of Sardis contained sherds of pottery graffitied with 𐤠𐤭𐤯 (ART), which was a suspension writing of the name Artimus, suggesting that a sanctuary of this goddess was located there.

The current remains of the temple of Artimus at Sardis date from the 3rd century BC in the Hellenistic Period, that is three centuries after the Lydian Empire; this temple was itself preceded by an archaic limestone altar which first was constructed between c. 550 and c. 500 BC, under Persian rule, with no structure having existed at this site before it, thus suggesting that the sanctuary of Artimus at Sardis was located elsewhere during the Lydian Empire.

Lydian rulers also had relations with Greek sanctuaries both in Anatolia and in mainland Greece, with an inscription reading ΒΑ ΚΡ ΑΝ ΘΗΚ ΕΝ, that is, βα[σιλεὺς] Κρ[οῖσος] ἀν[έ]θηκεν (ba[sileùs] Kr[oîsos] an[é]thēken), meaning lit. 'King Croesus dedicated (it)', having been recorded from a column dedication at the Temple of Artemis in Ephesus.

A still undiscovered sanctuary of Kufaws existed in Lydia, as suggested by spolia such as lion sculptures from the 5th to 4th centuries BC, a votive stela depicting Kufaws and Artimus, and a marble model of a temple of Kufaws from between c. 540 and c. 530 BC. This sanctuary appears to have been used from c. 550 to the 4th century BC, and the reuse of spolia from this sanctuary in the Late Roman period suggests that it was still functioning under Roman rule.

A model of a Ionic temple has tentatively been suggested to have possibly represented the temple of Kufaws at Sardis. The four sides of this model are decorated with different scenes:

- the back is decorated with several Greek and Lydian mythological scenes:
  - the top row shows birds flying around a tree, showing the role of Kufaws as a goddess of vegetation;
- the middle row shows a lion and a boar facing a tree;

the bottom row shows a centaur as well as two human men and a human woman;

- the left side is decorated with figures:
  - the top row shows maidens in procession;
  - the middle row shows crouching figures holding a cup and carrying either an animal or a wineskin on the shoulder, possibly depicting kōmastai from orgiastic rites;
- the bottom row shows female dancers;
- the right side is also decorated with figures:
  - the top row shows men in procession;
  - the middle row shows maidens in processions;
  - the bottom row shows lions, that is the symbol of Kufaws.

A small altar to the goddess Kufaws was located in the gold refinery precinct in Sardis, showing that she was a protector of the Lydian gold and silver industry. This altar was itself built in two phases:

- the original altar was constructed between c. 570 to c. 560 BC, during the reigns of Croesus or Alyattes, and its corners were initially decorated with lion sculptures of lions, the sacred animal of Kufaws, carved from sandstone;
- the altar was later remodelled during Persian rule.

The small size of this altar however suggests that this was not a state cult, but was instead a minor one.

=== Clergy ===
The early Lydian religion possessed at least three cultic officiants, consisting of:

- kawes (Lydian: 𐤨𐤠𐤥𐤤𐤮), who were priests and priestesses;
- šiwraλmi- (Lydian: 𐤳𐤦𐤥𐤭𐤠𐤷𐤪𐤦-), who were involved in the cult of Artimus;
- armτas (Lydian: 𐤠𐤭𐤪𐤴𐤠𐤮), who might have been prophets.

==== The priest-king ====
In addition to these clerical offices, the religious role of the kings among other Anatolian peoples suggests that Lydian kings were also religious high functionaries who participated in the cult as a representative of divine power on earth and claimed their legitimacy to rule from the gods. Anatolian and Hellenistic Greek parallels also suggest that Lydian kings might have been deified after their deaths.

==== The priesthood ====
The priests and priestesses were in charge of administering and maintaining the cults, which were individually organised, as attested by the existence of priests of Pakiš and of Lamẽtrus.

Little is otherwise known about Lydian priests and their functions, and their numbers, origins and duties are unknown.

However, one priest named Mitridaštas recorded in an inscription that he had handed over property to the temple of Artimus at Sardis, and he invoked the goddess to protect it, suggesting that priests could become wealthy enough to distribute property, although it is uncertain whether this was prevalent or rare.

The duties of the cultic personnel might have included dance, music, and divination:

- the depiction in Lydian artwork of drunken revellers, called kōmastai (κωμασταὶ) in Greek, attests of the practice of cultic dancing and drunken revelry in Lydian religion;
  - it is unknown whether Lydian "bacchanalia" existed, but Greek mythology also connected the god Dionysos with Lydia, and his alternative name of Bakkhos (Βάκχος) was a cognate of the Lydian theonym Pakiš (𐤡𐤠𐤨𐤦𐤳);
- which forms of divination were practised by the Lydians is unknown, but it was prevalent enough in both ancient Anatolia and Greece that one or multiple oracular practices might have been employed;
  - this might correspond to the claim of Herodotus of Halicarnassus that Lydian kings widely sought advice from Greek oracles.

=== Processions ===
Worship activities included processions, likely by priests and priestesses.

=== Festivals ===
Festivals marking spring and harvesting might have existed among the Lydians, although such celebrations, such as the Khrysanthina festival celebrated at Sardis in honour of the goddess Korē, are attested only from the Hellenistic Period.

=== Sacrifices ===
Lydians performed sacrifices to obtain the favour of their deities.

==== Ritual meals ====
Remains of one such type of sacrifice, which was likely composed of utensils used for ritual dinners, have been found in pits containing pitchers, cups, plates, knives, and cooking pots containing the skeletons of dismembered but not consumed puppies. These sacred meals were especially offered between c. 575 and c. 525 BC, possibly to protect the precinct buildings.

==== Protective depositions ====
In a later attested sacrificial ritual, pottery cups or vessels, metal instruments such as nails and needles, as well as pierced eggs, and coins, were deposited at the base of walls near the temple of Artimus; the deposition of eggs, especially, was performed as part of rituals for purification, for protection against evil curses, or to secure the success of businesses.

This ritual was also performed during Roman times, when such offerings were deposed under the floor of a room in a building, with a young pig having been placed under the floor of another room.

=== Oaths ===
A 5th or 4th century BCE Lydian inscription on a stele from Sardis invoked the goddess Artimus as witness for an agreement between Sardians and the Mermnad clan, and the stele itself was lest in the sacred precinct of the city as record to ensure that this agreement would be upheld in the future. This was a common Anatolian practice, and was also performed by the Hittites, who deposited the treaty between Tudḫaliya IV of Hattusa and Kuruntiya of Tarḫuntašša before six different deities.

== Sources ==
- Hutter, Manfred (2017). "Kubaba in the Hittite Empire and the Consequences for her Expansion to Western Anatolia". L'hittitologie aujourd'hui : Études sur l’Anatolie hittite et néo-hittite à l’occasion du centenaire de la naissance d’Emmanuel Laroche [Hittitology today: Studies on Hittite and Neo-Hittite Anatolia in Honor of Emmanuel Laroche's 100th Birthday]. Istanbul, Turkey: Institut français d'études anatoliennes. pp. 113–122. ISBN 978-2-362-45083-9.
- Neumann, G. [in German] (1990). "Lydien" [Lydia]. In Edzard, Dietz Otto; Calmeyer, P.; Postgate, J. N.; Röllig, W. [in German]; von Schuler, E. [in German]; von Soden, W.; Stol, M.; Wilhelm, G. (eds.). Reallexikon der Assyriologie und Vorderasiatischen Archäologie [Encyclopaedia of Ancient Near Eastern Studies] (in German). Vol. 7. Berlin, Germany; New York City, United States: Walter de Gruyter. pp. 184–186. ISBN 978-3-110-10437-0.
- Oreshko, Rostyslav (2021). "In Search of the Holy Cube Roots: Kubaba—Kubeleya—Κύβεβος—Kufaws and the Problem of Ethnocultural Contact in Early Iron Age Anatolia". In Bianconi, Michele (ed.). Linguistic and Cultural Interactions between Greece and Anatolia: In Search of the Golden Fleece. Leiden, Netherlands: Brill Publishers. pp. 131–166. ISBN 978-9-004-46159-8.
- Payne, Annick (2019). "Native Religious Traditions from a Lydian Perspective". In Blakely, Sandra; Collins, Billie Jean (eds.). Religious Convergence in the Ancient Mediterranean. Studies in Ancient Mediterranean Religions. Vol. 2. Atlanta, United States: Lockwood Press. pp. 231–248. ISBN 978-1-948-48816-7.
- Yakubovich, Ilya (2008). "Luwian Migrations in Light of Linguistic Contacts". In Collins, Billie Jean; Bachvarova, Mary R.; Rutherford, Ian C. [in German] (eds.). Anatolian Interfaces: Hittites, Greeks, and their Neighbors: Proceedings of an International Conference on Cross-cultural Interaction, September 17-19, 2004, Emory University, Atlanta, GA. Oxford, United Kingdom: Oxbow Books. pp. 123–134. ISBN 978-1-842-17270-4.
- Yakubovich, Ilya (2017). "An agreement between the Sardians and the Mermnads in the Lydian language?". Indogermanische Forschungen. 122 (1). De Gruyter: 265–294. doi:10.1515/if-2017-0014.
