= Dark Gods (Anatolian) =

Anatolian group of malevolent gods

- Other names: Dark Ones, Heptad, Dark Heptad
- Affiliation: Iyarri, Šanda

The Dark Gods or Dark Ones, also known as the Heptad, were a group of malevolent deities from the religions of the ancient Anatolian peoples.

== Name ==
=== The Dark Ones ===
This group of deities was known in Luwian as DINGIR^{MEŠ} Marwāinzi (𒀭𒈨𒌍𒈥𒉿𒀀𒅔𒍣) and ^{D}Marwayanza (𒀭𒈥𒉿𒅀𒀭𒍝), and in Hittite as ^{D}Markuwayaš (𒀭𒈥𒆪𒉿𒅀𒀸), all meaning lit. 'the Dark Ones'.

In Lydian, these deities were called the Mariwyas or Mariwdas (𐤪𐤠𐤭𐤦𐤥𐤣𐤠𐤮).

=== The Heptad ===
The Dark Gods were also referred to in Hittite as ^{D}Šēpittaš (𒀭𒐌𒐌𒁉 and 𒀭𒊺𒂊𒅁𒁉𒀉𒋫𒀸), that is the Heptad. ^{D}Šēpittaš was a loanword from the Akkadian ilū sebitti, meaning lit. 'seven gods', due to its similarity for the Proto-Indo-European term for this number, *septḿ̥.

In the ritual text KUB 59.26, this group of gods was referred to as "the Dark Heptad" (Hittite: 𒀭𒐌𒐌𒁉𒀭𒈥𒆪𒉿𒅀𒀸, romanized: ^{D}Šēpittaš ^{D}Markuwayaš).

== History ==
The Dark Gods and the plague-god Iyarri to whom they were associated might have originated from the Babylonian Erra and the Sebitti who accompanied him, with whom they were identical.

The Babylonian correspondence of the ilū sebitti was a direct influence on the Hittite conceptualisation of demons and negative forces as a Heptad, with the Hittite and Babylonian names being the same. This development dates from the reigns of Šuppiluliuma I and Mursili II, with the Dark Gods being among the gods who went before Mursili II in battle by opening the way with their terrible thrust.

Although it was later that the Dark Gods became more widely-known, this represented a reality already deeply-rooted in Anatolia, hence why the Dark Gods appeared among the gods of the Singer of Kaneš and were worshipped in many minor cult centres.

Despite their foreign origin, the Dark Gods and Iyarri had cult places primarily in Central Anatolia and the regions inhabited by Luwians, and Iyarri appeared in Anatolian theophoric names, thus attesting that the people who gave these names saw these deities as being part of their own culture, thus showing that they had become firmly rooted in the Hittite and Luwian religions and had not been transmitted to the Anatolian peoples through the intermediary of Hurrian religion.

=== Attestations ===
The Dark Gods are attested in the Hittite Empire, where they featured as assistants of the god Iyarri.

The Dark Gods were also mentioned in the rituals of Malli and Uḫḫamuwa from Arzawa.

The Heptad was also present in the religion of the Hurrian populations of Kizzuwatna:

- one ritual text mentioning them as part of the entourage of the gods Teššub, Šarruma and Tēnu, and where they were referred to as the "male gods of Šarruma" (𒀭𒈨𒌍𒇽𒈨𒌍𒀭𒈗𒈠𒊭);
- another text mentioned a Heptad of Ištar (𒀭𒐌𒐌𒁉𒀭𒈹);
- one text describing offerings of birds and breads mentioned the Heptad and the Hurrian god Ḫašulatḫi;
- one text reflecting cross-influences between Hittite and Hurrian cults mentioned the Heptad together with the Tutelary God of Tauriša;
- two fragmentary texts possibly recording a Syro-Hurrian myth mentioned "the daughter of the Heptad" (𒊭𒀭𒐌𒐌𒁉𒌉𒊩).

While the cult of the Dark Gods in Anatolia was not a borrowing from the Hurrians, Hurrian religion also associated them with their main deities, such as Šauška and Teššub.

During the Iron Age, the Dark Gods were attested in Lydia.

== Cult ==
=== Nature ===
The name "the Dark Ones" not only assigned an awe-inspiring appearance to this group of deities, but also ascribed to them a negative role. This is also visible in how one text referred to them as the "terrifying Heptad" (Hittite: 𒄩𒁺𒂵𒂊𒌍𒀭𒐌𒐌𒁉, romanized: ḫadugaēš ^{D}Šepittaeš) and another text called them the "evil Heptad" (Hittite: 𒄷𒌋𒉿𒀊𒉺𒂊𒌍𒀭𒐌𒐌𒁉, romanized: ḫūwappaēš ^{D}Šepittaeš).

The Dark Gods were conceived as consisting of 14 male deities, hence why their name was written in cuneiform using the Sumerogram ^{D}IMIN.IMIN.BI, where the duplication of the cuneiform sign for the number 7 (𒐌) represented a double Heptad.

The number 7 related to beneficent deities in Anatolia, and in the ritual KUB 9.28 some of the major deities including ^{D}IM and ^{D}UTU were associated in groups of seven and received offerings at seven hearths and libations from seven cups. Meanwhile, ^{D}IMIN.IMIN.BI denoted demons and negative forces, as attested by their epithets, and during the Month Festival all the gods received a libation inside the temple while the steward poured a libation out of the window for the Dark Gods to remove these terrible deities from the sacred interior of the temple.

Due to this disorderly nature of the Dark Gods, they received a billy-goat in sacrifice, unlike the rest of the gods, who usually received sheep.

The Dark Gods were deities of darkness as well as of the night, and, during a festival of the region of Nerik, rites of the night were performed in relation to the Dark Gods which consisted of arranging lamps, passing the night while carrying a meal consisting of a thick oil bread in front of the Dark Gods. The Dark Gods also received a nocturnal sacrifice together with Telepinu in his role as a god of agriculture.

The Dark Gods were also associated with the Tutelary-God in his role as a provider of abundance under the principle of the association of opposites.

While the Dark Gods have earlier been identified with the Pleiades and Ursa Major, Alfonso Archi has argued against this identification.

=== Function ===
As suggested by their collective name, the Dark Gods were considered to have a malevolent nature, which is also attested through their function in the Uḫḫamuwa ritual from Arzawa, where they represented pernicious forces.

In the text KUB 17.16 I, describing a ritual to be performed when humans, cattle and sheep are dying frightfully, several gods are invoked while the Dark Gods are considered to be responsible for the plague.

==== Association with other deities ====
In Mesopotamia, the Heptad was a group of minor deities or demons who formed the court of a greater deity, and this is the same role they occupied in the Hittite religion. Thus, the Heptad was attributed to the Storm-God, to the Sun-God, to the Tutelary-God, and to the War-God Iyarri.

During the Hittite Empire, the Dark Gods were associated with the god Iyarri who, like the Greek Apollo, shot his arrows at those he hates. In the Dandanku ritual, meant to prevent the plague in an army by convincing Iyarri to attack enemy countries instead of the Land of Ḫatti, the Heptad were his assistants as the Dark Gods of Iyarri (𒊭𒀭𒄿𒅀𒅈𒊑𒀭𒐌𒐌𒁉).

The Dark Gods were not only associated with deities having negative roles, and in the ritual text KBo 34.48 they were associated with the Tutelary-God of the Hunting Bag to eliminate evil, although these deities had different roles, since the performers of the ritual sought, during it, to obtain favour from the Tutelary God of the Hunting Bag but to keep the Dark Gods, referred to in the text as the "terrifying Heptad" (𒄩𒁺𒂵𒂊𒌍𒀭𒐌𒐌𒁉, ḫadugaēs ^{D}Šepittaeš), at bay.

In the ritual text Vs. I 16, the Dark Gods were associated with several solar deities, including the Sun, the Sun deity of the Ominous Signs, and the Sun goddess of the Earth, while the Dark Gods themselves appeared as the Heptad of the Sun (𒀭𒐌𒐌𒁉𒊭𒀭𒌓).

A Heptad of Tarḫunna (𒊭𒀭𒌋𒀭𒐌𒐌𒁉) also appears in a list structured like a kaluti- of the Hurrian tradition of Kizzuwatna, which itself describes a late ritual connected to the Hattian myth of the Moon falling from Heaven out of fear of the thunder, lightning and rains of the Storm-God. The Heptad also appears in the AN.TAḪ.ŠUM^{SAR} festival, where the Anatolian god Tarḫunna and the Hurrian god Teššub merge with each other, and during which offerings are given to the cart, weapons, thunder, clouds, dew, rains, father-gods, and vizier of Teššub, as well as to the paštištilaš Heptad.

Following Tudhaliya IV's restoration of cults in central Anatolia, the Dark Gods appear alongside the Storm-God, the Tutelary-God and Iyarri in lists which also mention the Storm-God of Aššur and Ištar of Nineveh.

In later texts recording the Month Festival, the Dark Gods appeared alongside deities such as Aškašepa, Maliya and Pirwa, who belonged to the circle of the Singer of Kaneš.

The Dark Gods of the Mount Piškurunuwa and Mount Tapala appear in the AN.TAḪ.ŠUM^{SAR}, and the Dark Gods of Mount Taha appear in another text. The Dark Gods of ^{D}LAMMA appear in a text concerning the gods of the Singer of Kaneš, and the "male gods of Maliya" appear in a late text.

During the 8th century BCE, the Hieroglyphic Luwian inscription KULULU 2 associated the Dark Gods with the war-god Sanda, who was himself similar to Iyarri. The KAYSERİ inscription also mentions the Dark God in a curse formula reading:

Hieroglyphic Luwian text

𔖖𔓢𔕙𔖪𔗆 𔐓𔕸𔗆𔖱𔓯 𔔼𔐤𔕸𔖱𔕐 𔔴𔑢𔑉𔑣𔕐
𔖖𔒅𔗑𔓁𔓁𔗐𔗔𔕸𔓁𔑢𔑰 𔖖𔓵𔗧...-𔗔 ... x𔗑
𔓁𔑢𔑻 ...
𔕐𔑷𔖹𔓊𔑣𔕸𔓁𔑢𔗬𔑰...
𔓁𔐞𔗷 𔖖𔗜𔒚𔕸𔕸𔗔𔗷 𔐣𔐤 𔐝𔗬𔓯

Transliteration

Tarḫunzas abassari naPari tubidi
Marwawannis=ba=wa=du=tta Nikkaruḫas [...
wa=du [... ]
istaraladi=ba=wa=du=ada=tta...]
a=wa=an=tta Kubabas appan muwai

Translation

[him] Tarḫunzas shall smite with his axe,
for him may Nika[ruḫa]s of the Maruwa ("Dark God") [...],
and for him [...
and for him they [shall come up(?)] from their throne,
[and him] Kubaba shall attack behind

In a 6th century BCE inscription from Lydia, the Mariwdas or Mariwyas were mentioned as minor demon-like figures who accompanied the god Sãntas, appearing in a curse formula on a tomb, reading:

Lydian text

𐤱𐤠𐤨𐤪𐤷 𐤮𐤵𐤫𐤯𐤠𐤮
𐤨𐤰𐤱𐤠𐤥𐤨 𐤪𐤠𐤭𐤦𐤥𐤣𐤠𐤨
𐤶𐤫𐤳𐤷𐤦𐤡𐤦𐤣

Transliteration

fak=mλ Sãntas
Kufaw(s)=k Mariwda(š)=k
ẽnšλip[id]

Translation

To him, Sãntas
and Kufaws and the Dark Gods
shall do harm

==== Priests ====
According to records of a festival celebrated by a prince in relation to the restoration of cults in the region of Nerik, a priest of the Dark Gods officiated in a temple of his god. The festival itself involved favourable deities, such as Tarḫunna, Telepinu, Kattaḫḫa, Ḫalki and Ḫasammili, and during it the priests of the Dark Gods, of Telepinu and of Kattaḫḫa acted together.

==== Cult sites ====
While the Dark Gods were excluded from the sacred interior of temples, they could have their own chapel.

There were Heptads of the mountains in the central Hittite region such as Parnašša, Piškurunuwa, Šuranḫapa, Taḫa, Tapāla and Ziwāna, and there might have been a Heptad of the spring Ta[...].

The cult of the Dark Gods is attested at Karaḫna, a town which temporarily came under Kaskian control, as well as at smaller towns like Iššanašša, Šapakurwanta, Šappitta, Taḫpita, and ^{URU}DU_{6} ^{I}Ḫūrlušša.

== Sources ==
- Archi, Alfonso (2010). "The Heptad in Anatolia". In Lebrun, René; De Vos, Julien (eds.). Hethitica XVI. Louvain-la-Neuve, France: Peeters Publishers. pp. 21–34. ISBN 978-9-042-92338-6.
- Hawkins, John David [in German] (2000a). Inscriptions of the Iron Age, Part 2: Text: Amuq, Aleppo, Hama, Tabal, Assur Letters, Miscellaneous, Seals, Indices. Corpus of Hieroglyphic Luwian Inscriptions. Vol. 1. Berlin, Germany; New York City, United States: Walter de Gruyter. ISBN 978-3-110-10864-4.
- Hawkins, John David [in German] (2000b). Inscriptions of the Iron Age, Part 3: Plates. Corpus of Hieroglyphic Luwian Inscriptions. Vol. 1. Berlin, Germany; New York City, United States: Walter de Gruyter. ISBN 978-3-110-10864-4.
- Hutter, Manfred (2017). "Kubaba in the Hittite Empire and the Consequences for her Expansion to Western Anatolia". L'hittitologie aujourd'hui : Études sur l’Anatolie hittite et néo-hittite à l’occasion du centenaire de la naissance d’Emmanuel Laroche [Hittitology today: Studies on Hittite and Neo-Hittite Anatolia in Honor of Emmanuel Laroche's 100th Birthday]. Istanbul, Turkey: Institut français d'études anatoliennes. pp. 113–122. ISBN 978-2-362-45083-9.
- Neumann, G. [in German] (1990). "Lydien" [Lydia]. In Edzard, Dietz Otto; Calmeyer, P.; Postgate, J. N.; Röllig, W. [in German]; von Schuler, E. [in German]; von Soden, W.; Stol, M.; Wilhelm, G. (eds.). Reallexikon der Assyriologie und Vorderasiatischen Archäologie [Encyclopaedia of Ancient Near Eastern Studies] (in German). Vol. 7. Berlin, Germany; New York City, United States: Walter de Gruyter. pp. 184–186. ISBN 978-3-110-10437-0.
- Oreshko, Rostyslav (2021). "In Search of the Holy Cube Roots: Kubaba—Kubeleya—Κύβεβος—Kufaws and the Problem of Ethnocultural Contact in Early Iron Age Anatolia". In Bianconi, Michele (ed.). Linguistic and Cultural Interactions between Greece and Anatolia: In Search of the Golden Fleece. Leiden, Netherlands: Brill Publishers. pp. 131–166. ISBN 978-9-004-46159-8.
