= Luwian religion =

Religion of the ancient Luwian people of Anatolia

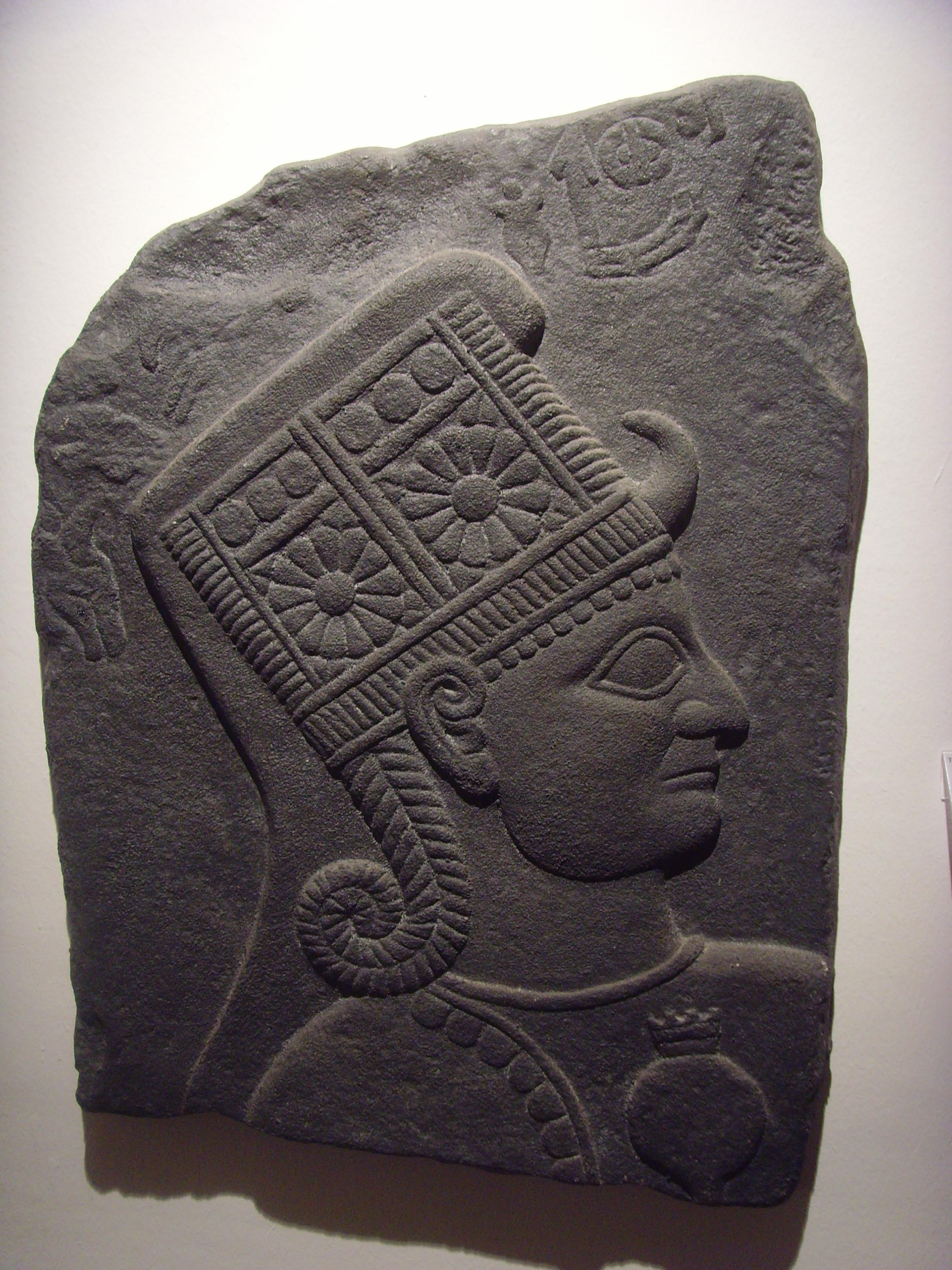
"Kupapa, Great Queen of Karkamis" was among the most important deities of the later Luwians

Luwian religion was the religious and mythological beliefs and practices of the Luwians, an Indo-European people of Asia Minor, which is detectable from the Bronze Age until the early Roman Empire. It was strongly affected by foreign influence in all periods and it is not possible to clearly separate it from neighbouring cultures, particularly Syrian and Hurrian religion. The Indo-European element in the Luwian religion was stronger than in the neighbouring Hittite religion.

== Periodisation ==
The Luwian religion can be divided into two periods: the Bronze Age period and the Iron Age or Late Luwian period. During the Bronze Age, the Luwians were under the control of the Hittites. They spoke the Luwian language, a close relative of the Hittite language. Although a hieroglyphic script existed in the Bronze Age, which was used for writing Luwian, there are only a few known religious texts of the Luwians from the Bronze Age.

After the collapse of the Hittite empire, several Late Luwian states formed in northern Syria and Southern Anatolia, which came partially under Aramaean influence and were conquered by the Assyrians by the 8th century BC. Important Luwian centres in this period included Carchemish, Melid, and Tabal.

The Luwian religion is attested up to the early Roman period in southern Anatolia, specially in Cilicia, mostly in theophoric personal names.

=== Bronze Age ===
The earliest evidence of the Luwians comes from the Old Assyrian archive of traders at the Karum of Kaneš (c. 1900 BC), where some people bear clearly Luwian names, including theophoric names. These indicate that Šanta and Runtiya were worshipped as deities in this period.

In Hittite text, pieces of Luwian language often appear in magic rituals, intended to bring rain or heal the sick. These give an important role to the goddess Kamrusepa. However, local cults are also attested, like Ḫuwaššanna of Ḫubišna (modern Ereğli, Konya). The pantheon of the city of Ištanuwa, which is thought to be in the area of the Sakarya River, belongs to the Luwian religious zone.

=== Iron Age ===
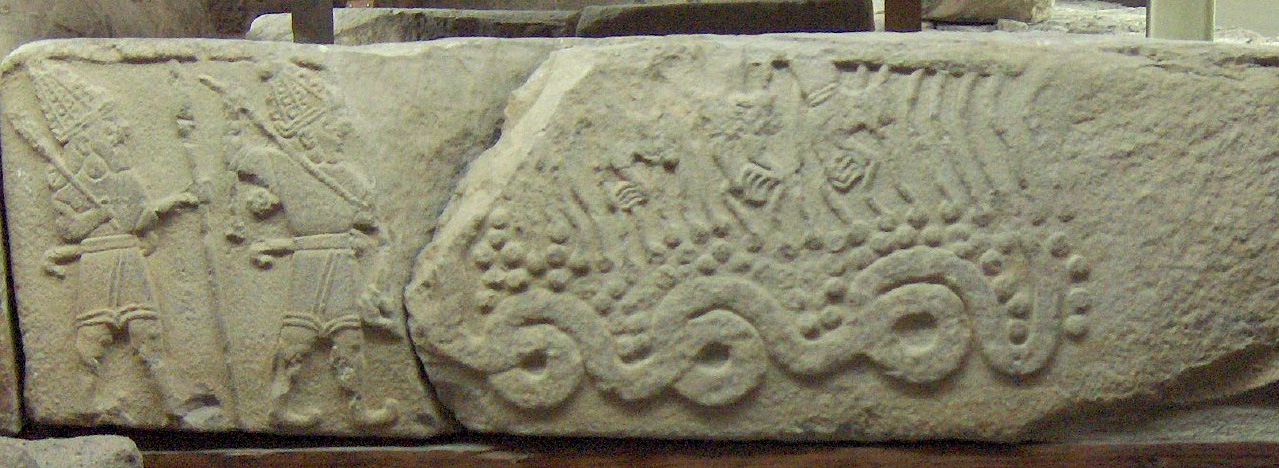
Late Luwian relief from Melid with the weather god and a companion, battling a serpentine monster

Luwian rulers and traders left behind several inscriptions, from the 11th century BC onwards, which provide rich evidence about the religion of the Iron Age Luwians. Among these are depictions of the deities, in the form of statues or rock cut reliefs in the style of Hittite rock reliefs. Many images are known from Melid in particular, which were created by one especially pious king of the 10th century. The reliefs show the king giving libations before a number of deities. One of them also depicts an image of the weather god's battle with a snake-like demon, which recalls the Hittite myth of Illuyanka and the Greek myth of Typhon.

=== Classical Anatolia ===
According to the evidence of theophoric personal names from ancient Anatolia, mainly Cilicia and Lycaonia, the Luwian religion survived into the Roman period. The cult of Šanta is attested at Tarsus, where he was identified with Heracles. Similar traces, but with clear differences, can be seen in the religion of the Lycians and Carians, who were close relatives of the Luwians.

== Deities ==
The Luwian pantheon changed over time. Tarhunt, Tiwad, Arma, Runtiya, and Šanta can be pointed to as the typical Luwian gods, which were always worshipped (the Syrian Kubaba probably also belongs to this group). The Hurrian element, which included Syrian and Babylonian influences, becomes visible later on, with deities like Iya, Hipatu, Šaruma, Alanzu, and Šauska. Unlike the Hittite religion, the Luwians were not significantly influenced by Hattian religion. In the Iron Age, there was also direct influence from Babylonian religion (e.g. Marutika = Marduk) and Aramaean religion (Pahalat = Baalat/Baltis), especially in the way the gods were depicted.

=== Luwian deities ===
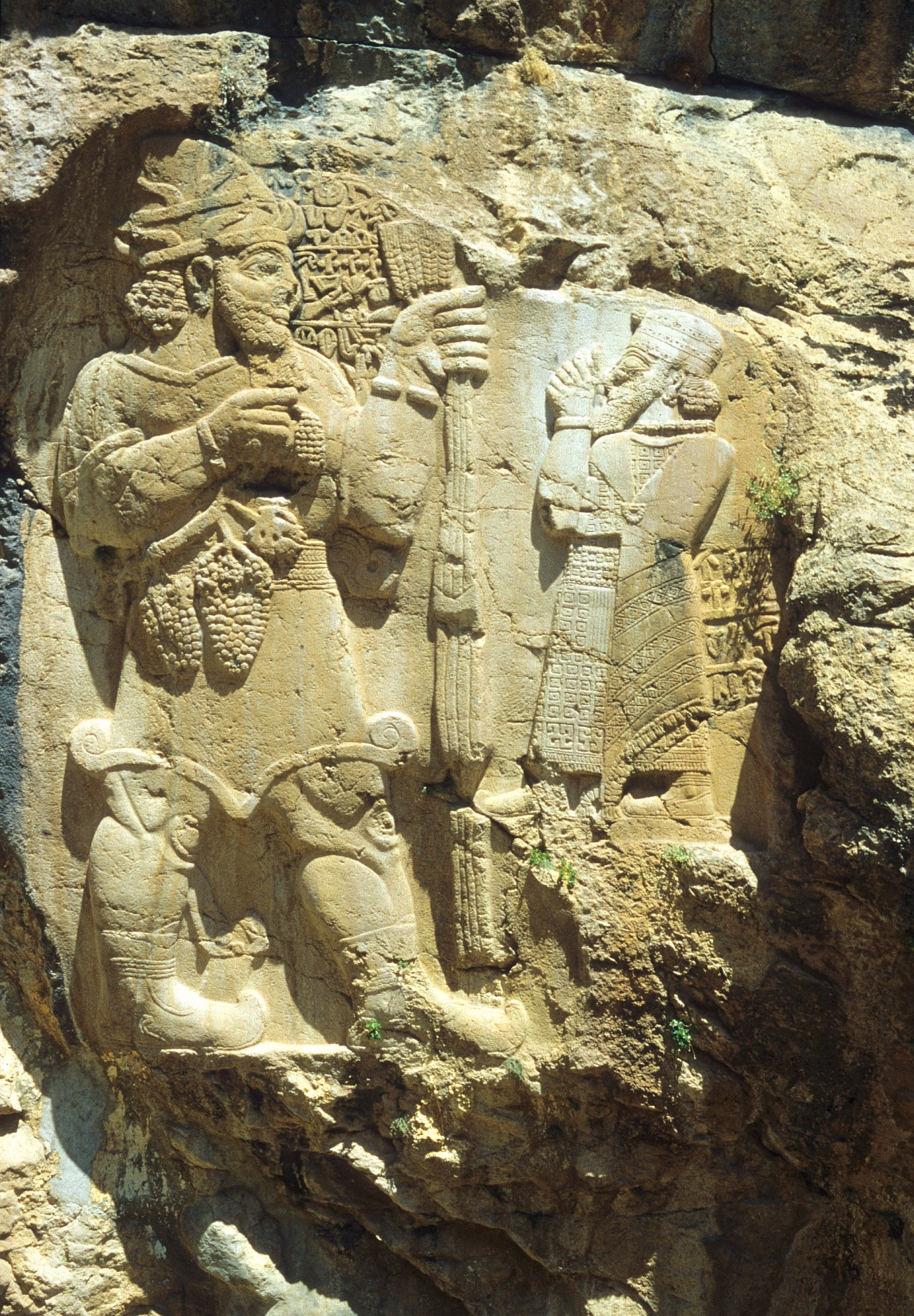
The İvriz relief shows King Warpalawas in front of "Tarhunza of the Vineyard."

==== Tarhunz / Tarhunt ====
Tarḫunz/Tarhunt (Nominative: Tarḫunz, Tarhunzas) was the weather god and chief god of the Luwians. Unlike Hittite Tarḫunna and Hurrian Teššub, his chariot was pulled by horses, not bulls. Usually, the weather god takes on clear traits of a fertility god, as in Late Luwian images showing Tarhunza with bunches of grapes and ears of grain. One of his epithets, piḫaššašši ("of the thunderbolt") was especially venerated in Tarḫuntašša, which was at one point the capital of the Hittite empire. Tarḫunt piḫaššašši was even chosen as the personal guardian god of King Muwatalli II. It is assumed that the Greek winged horse, Pegasus, which carried Zeus' thunderbolt, derives its name from this Luwian epithet.

According to Late Luwian texts, Tarhunz gave the king royal power, courage, and marched before him in battle. He brought victory and conquests. In curse formulae, Tarhunz is called upon to "smash enemies with his axe." Often he is referred to as "Tarhunz of the Heavens". His most important cult centre was Aleppo, where a cult went back to the Bronze Age. The Hittite king Šuppiluliuma I had appointed his son Telipinu as priest and king of Aleppo.

As "Tarhunza of the vineyard" (Tarhunzas Tuwarsas), he was worshipped in Tabal. King Warpalawas of Tuwanuwa depicted him with ears of grain and bunches of grapes on the İvriz relief. Near the relief is a natural spring, which underlined the fertility aspect of the weather god. Cows and sheep were offered to him as sacrifices, in the hope that he would make the grain and the wine grow.

In late Luwian reliefs, Tarhunza is depicted as a bearded god with a short skirt and a helmet. In his right hand he bears an axe or a hammer and in his left hand he holds a bundle of thunderbolts. Often he is shown standing on a bull, like the Weather god of Aleppo.

Late Luwian inscriptions from Arslantepe also indicate local weather gods, of which nothing more is known than their names.

==== Other deities ====
Tiwad (Nom.: Tiwaz) was the Sun god. The Luwians had no female sun deity like the Hittite Sun goddess of Arinna. One of Tiwad's epithets was tati ("father"). The Late Luwian king Azatiwada ("Beloved of Tiwad") referred to him as "Tiwad of the Heavens".

Kamrušipa was the wife of Tiwad and mother of the guardian god Runtiya. She played an important role in magic rituals. In Late Luwian sources, she is not attested.

Arma was the moon god and appears in a large number of theophoric personal names (e.g. Armaziti, "Man of Arma"), suggesting that he was a popular deity. In the Iron Age he completely merged with the moon god Sin of Harran and is often referred to in inscriptions as "Harranian Arma". He is depicted as a winged and bearded god with a crescent moon on his helmet. His name was written in Luwian hieroglyphs with a lunette. In curse formulae he is asked to "spear" the victim "with his horn."

Runtiya was a guardian god. His animal was the deer and his name was written in hieroglyphs with a deer's antlers. In Late Luwian texts, he is connected to the wilderness and serves as a god of the hunt. He is depicted as a god armed with bow and arrow, standing on a deer. His partner is the goddess Ala, who was identified with Kubaba in Kummuh.

Šanta/Santa was a death-bringing god, named along with the dark Marwainzi, as is Nikarawa in Late Luwian texts. This largely unknown deity was called upon in curses to feed an enemy to his dogs or to eat the enemy himself. Šanta was identified with the Babylonian god Marduk in the Bronze Age. His cult endured in Cilician Tarsos until classical antiquity where he was identified with Sandan-Herakles.

The goddess of fate Kwanza and the plague god Iyarri are only attested indirectly in Late Luwian names. In the Bronze Age, the former was known as Gulza.

=== Deities adopted from elsewhere ===
Kupapa was one of the most important goddesses of the Late Luwian pantheon. Her attributes were a mirror and a pomegranate. Her partner was Karhuha. Originally she was the civic goddess of Carchemish, but in the Iron Age, her cult spread over the whole of Anatolia and she was adopted by the Lydians as Kufaws/Kubaba. Whether the Phrygian goddess Cybele derives from Kubaba remains uncertain. The late Luwian king of Carchemish invoked her as "Kupapa, great queen of Carchemish". In curses, Kupapa is called upon to attack the enemy from behind or to unleash her hasami hound on them.

Hipatu or Hiputa was the Late Luwian name of the Hurro-Syrian goddess Ḫepat. She is depicted as an enthroned goddess together with Saruma (Hurrian Šarruma), standing on a mountain, who was her son according to Hittite sources. The latter is often named with Alanzu, who is his sister according to Hittite texts. Along with Tarhunz he marches ahead of the general in battle and "seizes victory from the enemy." His epithet is "mountain king."

Sauska is depicted on the Late Luwian relief at Melid as a winged goddess with an axe, standing upon two birds.

Kumarma was a grain goddess, who was worshipped along with Matili and the wine god Tipariya. She is related to the Hurrian god Kumarbi.

== Bibliography ==
- H. Craig Melchert (Ed): The Luwians; HdO, Bd. 68, Boston 2003. ISBN 90-04-13009-8
- Maciej Popko: Religions of Asia Minor; Warschau 1995. ISBN 83-86483-18-0.
- Piotr Taracha: Religions of second millennium Anatolia. ISBN 978-3-447-05885-8.
- Manfred Hutter: Aspects in Luwian Religion. In: H. Craig Melchert (Hrsg.): The Luwians (= Handbuch der Orientalistik. Band 1,68). Brill, Leiden 2003, ISBN 90-04-13009-8, S. 211–280.
