= Kuwannaniya =

Hittite spring goddess

- Spring goddess
- Major cult center: Tauriša

Genealogy
- Spouse: possibly Ḫašamili

Kuwannaniya was a Hittite spring goddess. She was also worshiped by Luwians. Multiple springs bearing the same name are attested. Like other similar goddesses, she might have been depicted as a young woman pouring water from a vessel. She was worshiped in Tauriša, Zalpa, and a number of other settlements.

== Name and character ==
Kuwannaniya's name is most likely derived from the Hittite term kuwanna, "of lapis lazuli". (Note: It is likely a cognate of Greek Kuane ("blue"), attested as the name of two different nymphs, one associated with Miletus and the other with Syracuse, but according to Ian Rutherford most likely all three of those deities arose independently from each other, as it is plausible that multiple cultures named different bodies of water and deities corresponding to them after terms referring to the color blue.) The theonym Kunnaniya, referenced in a list of deities venerated in the region of Ḫanḫana (likely located close to modern Çorum), is presumed to be a haplographic variant of the same name. A further attested variant is Kuwannaliya, which occurs interchangeably with the standard spelling in different copies of a list of deities worshiped in the city of Mallitta.

Kuwannaniya was regarded as a spring goddess. Multiple springs bearing this name are mentioned in Hittite texts. As noted by Gary Beckman, Hittites simultaneously regarded springs as sacred spaces (numina) and minor goddesses. Analogous evidence exists for rivers and, in the case of the text CTH 635, for a pond (luli-); however, springs were seemingly considered the most significant, as they occur more commonly than other bodies of water in religious texts. Springs are also listed among natural features invoked as witnesses in treaties, next to mountains, rivers, sea, heaven, earth, winds and clouds.

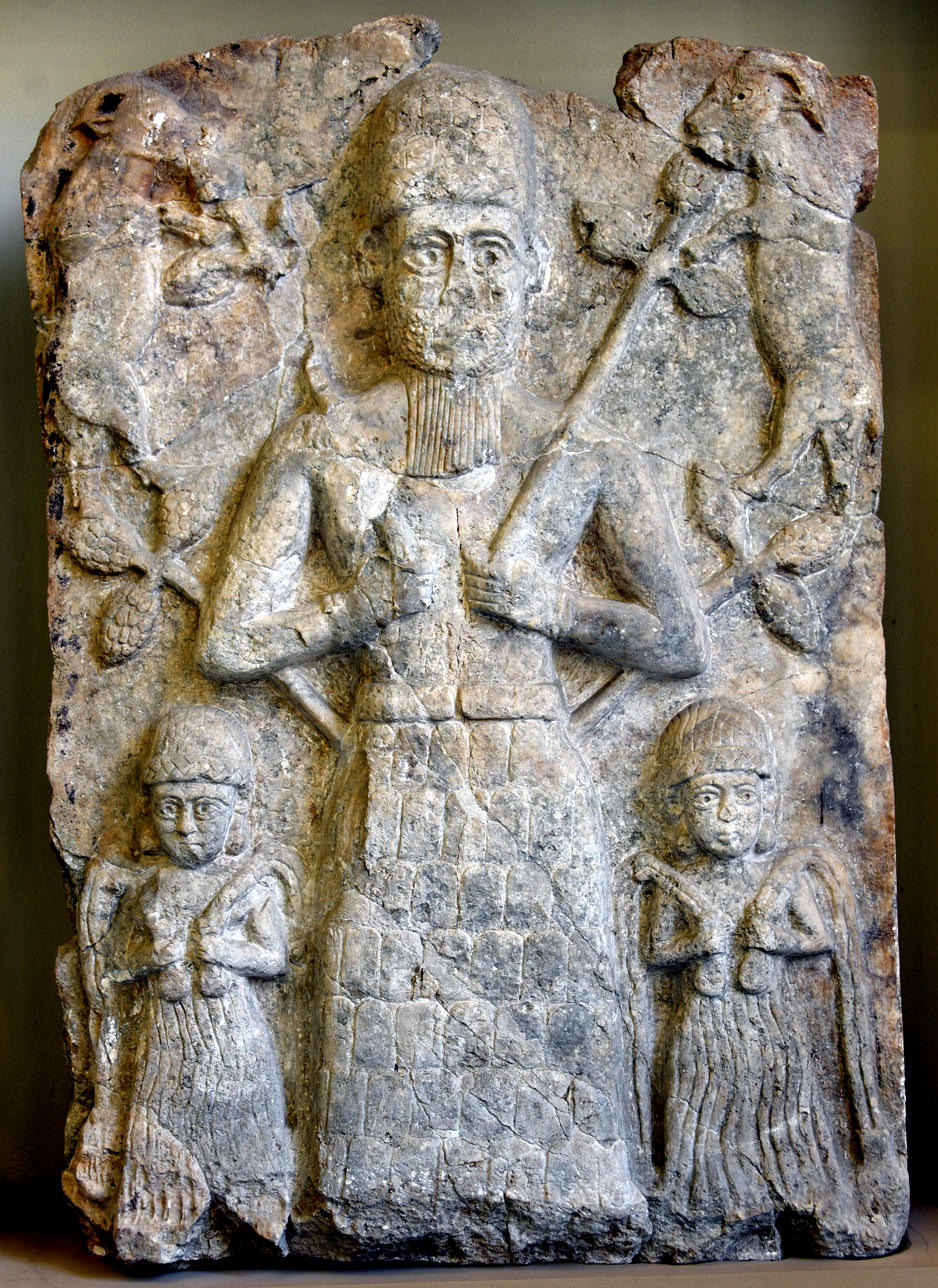
A relief from Assur showing a mountain god accompanied by two spring goddesses.

Volkert Haas compared Hittite spring goddesses to Greek nymphs. He proposed that in art they were depicted as young women pouring water out of vessels. This motif is attested in art of both Anatolia and Mesopotamia, with multiple examples discovered during the excavations of the Old Babylonian palace of Zimri-Lim in Mari. Similar figures were sometimes depicted alongside mountain gods in both regions, for example on a relief from Assur.

=== Proposed identification with other deities ===
Charles W. Steitler suggests that Aššiyanza (Aššiyaza), "beloved", a deity who appears in offering lists either immediately after Ḫašamili or after both him and Kuwannaniya, might have been either an alternate name or title of her designating her as his concubine, or alternatively a closely related goddess of similar character. However, he states that the nature of associations between deified natural features and other members of the Hittite pantheon remains poorly researched.

== Worship ==
The worship of Kuwannaniya could take place either outdoors, near a body of water she was believed to represent, or in temples. References to offerings to her and other deified springs being made through windows presumably refer to placing them outside a temple, though possibly a receptacle was used instead of the sacrifice being poured or thrown to the ground. The text CTH 617 prescribes offering loaves of bread to her through the window of a shrine, presumably implying that a natural feature located outside is meant in this case.

Kuwannaniya was worshiped by Hittites and Luwians in Tauriša and other settlements located on the banks of the river Zuliya. (Note: It is assumed to be the Hittite name of the Çekerek River.) She was invoked as one of the deities of this city in the AN.TAḪ.ŠUM festival (CTH 617).

In Zalpa Kuwannaniya was worshiped in the form of a ḫuwaši stele, as attested in a text dated from the second half of the thirteenth century BCE dealing with celebrations held during a visit of a prince from the ruling family in the city. However, as pointed out by Piotr Taracha she was not a native deity in this area, and she might have been introduced to the local pantheon after the city was rebuilt, which might have involved population transfer from an area where she was better established, like the Zuliya basin.

Reference to Kuwannaniya being worshiped in the form of a ḫuwaši is also known from a text dealing with the pantheons of three northern Hittite cities whose names are not preserved, in which she occurs alongside deities such as Iyarri, Iyaya, Milku, the sun goddess of the Earth, and others. She and Iyaya were also worshiped together in the city of Annitešša. (Note: It has been proposed that the latter also was a spring goddess.)

According to the text CTH 510, Kuwannaniya was also worshiped in Mallitta. This city is already mentioned in the Old Assyrian texts from Kanesh, and was most likely located near it, further to the west, in the proximity of middle Kızılırmak River. (Note: It was known to the Hittites as Marassanta.)

In Zikmar, a city located near Hapatha and Kaštama, celebrations focused on the local storm god took place near a spring named Kuwannaniya.
