= Ḫalki =

Hittite grain deity

- Deity of grain
- Major cult center: Hattusa, Nerik
- Gender: variable

Equivalents
- Hattian: Kait
- Mesopotamian: Nisaba

Ḫalki was the Hittite deity of grain. While it is commonly assumed the name consistently referred to a goddess, a male form of this deity has also been identified. Ḫalki was associated with other grain deities, namely Mesopotamian Nisaba and Hattian Kait, with the latter presumed to be functionally identical. The oldest attestations come from Kanesh, though they are limited to theophoric names. In later periods, the female form of Ḫalki was worshiped in Hattusa, and the male one in Nerik, though evidence from other cities is also available.

== Name and character ==
Ḫalki was regarded as the deity of grain. The name is identical with the ordinary Hittite word for grain, in at least some contexts specifically used to refer only to barley (logographically ŠE).

It is generally assumed that Ḫalki was a goddess at least through the Old Hittite period, though sometimes the term "deity" is used instead out of caution. The former assumption is supported by epithets such as DUMU.MUNUS-la and supessara (KI.SIKIL), both of which can be translated as "young woman". However, explicit references to a male form of Ḫalki have been identified too, in addition a text in which two forms of the deity are invoked, with only one explicitly referred to as female, which most likely indicated a need to differentiate between them due to this aspect of their character differing.

== Associations with other deities ==
Possibly as early as in the Old Hittite period, the Sumerogram ^{d}NISABA came to be used as a logographic writing of Ḫalki's name in Hittite sources. Nisaba was a Mesopotamian goddess similarly associated with grain, and she is first attested in Anatolia in the Old Assyrian texts from Kanesh as one of the deities of the foreign traders, though there is no indication that she continued to be worshiped there after they abandoned the site. It has been argued that her name was only ever used as a logogram in Hittite sources, but according too Piotr Taracha she might have been separately introduced to the Hittite pantheon at some point. Alfonso Archi notes that the use of the logogram ^{d}NISABA to represent Ḫalki's influenced the tradition of representing the Hurrian god Kumarbi, who prior to being incorporated into Hittite tradition independently developed a similar connection to the Mesopotamian goddess, under Ḫalki's name. Examples are known from texts linked to the city of Ankuwa. Taracha notes this is one of the two examples where a Hittite deity was associated in that capacity with a foreign one of a different gender, the other being the case of Lelwani and Allatum.

The Hattian theonym corresponding to Ḫalki's name was Kait. This Hattic word similarly means "grain". According to Piotr Taracha both names functionally referred to the same goddess. The equation between the two is confirmed by a bilingual text from the Old Hittite period, KUB 28.75, which also states that Kait's name (not preceded by a so-called "divine determinative", dingir) among the gods was ḫāyamma (similarly lacking the dingir sign). Mark Weeden has proposed that it might be a combination of the name of the spouse of Nisaba, Haya, and an unknown Hattic element, amma, which he tentatively translates as "mother", though he also considers a fully Hattic origin plausible. Taracha notes that this explanation does not match the consensus view that the Hattic word for mother was either šemu or mu/wu_{u}.

The text KBo 20.101 indicates that the female version of Ḫalki was believed to have a daughter also named Ḫalki (^{d}ḫalkin DUMU.MUNUS-lan ^{d}ḫalkin, "Ḫalki [and] baby girl Ḫalki"), who seemingly represented young seeds. Volkert Haas speculatively proposed that this pair might have been comparable to Greek Demeter and Kore.

The male version of Ḫalki, known from the text KBo 52.20 + E 780, apparently was regarded as the husband of Ḫatepinu (otherwise attested as the wife of Telipinu) and of a goddess from Ḫarpiša designated by the Sumerogram ^{d}NIN.É.GAL, the brother of tutelary god of Zitḫara (Zitḫariya), and possibly as the father of the weather god of Nerik (presumably a local tradition, compared in scholarship to references to Šulinkatte and the sun goddess of the Earth being his parents).

== Worship ==
Ḫalki is already attested in texts from the Old Assyrian trading colony located in Kanesh. In contrast with major deities from the local pantheon such as Anna and Nipas, she is chiefly attested in theophoric names, one example being Ḫalkiaššu, an official at the time of king Waršama. It has additionally been suggested that the attestations of the Mesopotamian goddess Nisaba from the same site might be references to Ḫalki. For uncertain reasons, a different spelling of Nisaba's name are used in used in Anatolian rather than Assyrian context, with the former possibly designating an Anatolian goddess, specifically Ḫalki, instead.

Ḫalki's association with Kanesh was preserved in later Hittite sources, where she is listed among the deities praised in the songs of the "singer of Kanesh" during festivals. She worshiped in various parts of the Hittite Empire. It is presumed the male version of this deity was venerated in the north, but ultimately in most cases it is not possible to distinguish whether it can be assumed that a local hypostasis of Ḫalki was not female.

The female version of Ḫalki was worshiped in Hattusa. A temple dedicated to her existed in this city, according to Piotr Taracha most likely as early as in the Old Hittite period. According to a document with instructions for a local "mayor" (ḪAZANNU) it was also a grain storehouse. Textual sources indicate it was located near the "gate of the (water) drawing", presumed to be an entrance to the citadel identified during excavations. However, while multiple houses of worship have been excavated, none of them can be presently assigned to specific deities. In the same city Ḫalki was also worshiped in the so-called "Great Temple" constructed during the reign of Tudḫaliya IV, which was dedicated to various deities belonging to the state pantheon. She was also among the deities invoked during the KI.LAM festival, which otherwise mostly involved figures of Hattian origin. One of the ceremonies held during it involved governors of individual cities of the Hittite Empire presenting grain-based offerings provided by their domains to the king in front of Ḫalki's temple.

A temple of Ḫalki was also located in Nerik, where this deity was also worshiped in the temple of the local weather god, as indicated by a document from the reign of Muwatalli II. Most likely the male version is meant in this case. Ḫalki also belonged to the local pantheons of Karaḫna, a city located in the proximity of the middle run of Zuliya (Çekerek River), and Ištanuwa in the west of the Hittite sphere of influence. During a festival held in the latter settlement, she was paired with Maliya.

In an early ritual meant to guarantee the prosperity of the royal family, Ḫalki is paired with Šuwaliyat. This reflected a tradition tied to domestic cult of these deities.

Clergy involved in the worship of Ḫalki included the šiwanzanna (AMA.DINGIR) priestesses, whose name can be translated as "mother of the deity", as well as the SANGA priestesses. In Hattusa, the former managed her cult.
