= Koloe =

Koloe may refer to:

- Koloe, earlier name of Qohaito, an ancient city in Eritrea
- Koloe (Lydia), a town of ancient Lydia
