= Ḫatepuna =

Hattian goddess

- "Daughter of the sea", agricultural goddess
- Major cult center: Ḫanḫana, Kašḫa, Kaperi

Genealogy
- Parents: Aruna (father)
- Spouse: Telipinu, Ḫalki

Ḫatepuna or Ḫatepinu was a Bronze Age Anatolian goddess of Hattian origin, also worshiped by Hittites and Kaška. She was regarded as the wife of Telipinu, and like him was likely an agricultural deity. In a different tradition, her husband was the male form of the grain deity Ḫalki. It is presumed that she can be identified with the anonymous "daughter of the sea" who appears in two Hittite myths.

== Name and character ==
Variants of Ḫatepuna's name include Ḫatepinu and possibly Ḫalipinu, attested in a Hittite text describing the pantheon of Zalpa. The breve is sometimes omitted in transcription. The first syllable might be the Hattic word for sea. The suffix pina or pinu is attested in many other names of both male and female deities of Hattic origin, such as Tetepinu, Telipinu or Zalipinu, and can be translated as "child". It has therefore been proposed that Ḫatepunas name might mean "sea daughter". It is presumed that she was imagined as a young woman.

Ḫatepuna was regarded as the spouse of Telipinu. It is presumed that they were both associated with agriculture. Due on the connection between them it has been proposed that the sparsely attested theonym Kappariyamu, classified as a member of the category of Anatolian tutelary deities (^{d}LAMMA) and attested in enumerations of deities directly before Telipinu in a number of festival texts, was an alternate name of Ḫatepuna. However, the existence of a tradition in which she was the spouse of a male form of the grain deity Ḫalki has also been noted, which according to Piotr Taracha might indicate that in individual northern and central Anatolian settlements she had different spouses.

== Worship ==
In Ḫanḫana, Kašḫa (both located in modern Çorum Province), Durmitta and Tawiniya Ḫatepuna formed the main pair of the local pantheon alongside Telipinu. She also held a prominent position in many settlements located in the basin of Zuliya (modern Çekerek River). Further cities where she was worshiped include Maliluḫa, from which she is invoked in a birth ritual, and in Zalpa, where during a festival which involved a Hittite prince she received offerings as one of the twelve deities represented in the form of a ḫuwaši stele. Additionally, a possible reference to "Ḫatepinu of Nerik" occurs in KBo 52.20+, a text describing the pantheon of the northern city Ḫarpiša.

A temple of Ḫatepuna also existed in Kaperi (classical Kabeira, modern Niksar), where she was worshiped without any apparent connection to another deity. There is evidence that she was venerated there by the Kaška people. According to the annals of Muršili II, in the twenty fifth year of his reign he conquered the city, but did not harm the temple or its staff, which according to Itamar Singer was meant to be a display of his piety and a way to create contrast between himself and the Kaška, who based on available sources did not treat houses of worship in attacked territories similarly.

== Mythology ==
It is presumed that a nameless figure referred to as the "daughter of the sea" in Hittite literary texts corresponds to Ḫatepuna.

In the myth Telipinu and the Daughter of the Sea God, the eponymous god is dispatched to recover the Sun god of Heaven, kidnapped by the personified sea (Aruna). The latter is afraid of him, and offers him his daughter as a bride. She subsequently stays with Telipinu in the abode of his father, the weather god Tarḫunna, but her own father eventually demands a bride price. After consulting the goddess Ḫannaḫanna, Tarḫunna decides to pay, and the sea god receives a thousand cattle and a thousand sheep in exchange for his daughter. Only a single further line, a mention to the brothers of an unspecified person, is preserved, though it is possible that the tablet KBo 26.128, a short fragment of a literary text in which Telipinu lets the sea god know that he slept with his daughter, is also a part of the same narrative. It has been argued that the myth might reflect the traditions of Zalpuwa, where both Ḫatepuna and Telipinu were worshiped.

The "daughter of the sea" also plays a role in the myth of Ḫaḫḫima ("frost"). In this composition, she resides in heaven and apparently informs her father that the eponymous being is planning to kidnap the sun god, prompting him to try to save the latter.
