= Aškašepa =

Hittite mountain god

- Deified mountain
- Major cult center: Hattusa, Ištanuwa, Karaḫna

Aškašepa was a Hittite deity presumed to be a deified mountain, possibly Mount Erciyes. He is first attested in a treaty from Kanesh, and continued to be regarded as one of the deities associated with this city in later sources. He was worshiped in cities such as Hattusa, Ištanuwa and Karaḫna. He also appears in a number of international treaties between the rulers of the Hittite Empire and other contemporary monarchs as one of the invoked divine witnesses.

== Name and character ==
Aškašepa's name can be translated as "genius of the gate". The word aška- means "door" in Hittite. It could be represented in cuneiform by the Sumerogram KÁ, similarly meaning gate. The suffix -šepa and its variants, -šipa, -zipa and -zepa according to Gojko Barjamovic was used to form theonyms which all can be interpreted as the "female deifications of the basic word". However, according to Alice Mouton, Aškašepa was male, and the assumption on the contrary relied on incorrect reading of the phrase MUNUS.LUGAL as a title of this deity, rather than a separate theonym. In contrast with most of the other deities with similarly constructed names such as Daganzipa, Išpanzašepa or Miyatanzipa, Aškašepa can be considered a major member of the Hittite pantheon.

The name Aškašepa also referred to a mountain, according to Volkert Haas most likely Mount Erciyes. Barjamovic accepts this as a possibility, but additionally suggests identification with an unspecified high point of the Taurus range located close to the route of Assyrian trade caravans as another option. Aškašepa's presumed character as a mountain deity in the light of Hittite views on the nature of divine representations of such landmarks would make it plausible that the name referred to a male figure.

== Worship ==
Hittites celebrated Aškašepa with the songs of the so-called "singer of Kanesh". However, according to Oguz Soysal none of the attestations of this deity come from texts from the period of Old Assyrian trading colony's existence at the site or from the subsequent era of the so-called "Hittite Old Kingdom". Gojko Barjamovic in a more recent publications states the name occurs in a list of divine witnesses in a treaty between Kanesh and Assur. Alfonso Archi, following earlier studies, notes that regardless of the origin of its individual members, the group of "gods of Kanesh" in Hittite sources was seemingly a conglomerate only formed in the thirteenth century BCE. In Hittite ritual texts, Aškašepa appears alongside its other members, such as Maliya and Pirwa. In a ritual meant to guarantee the prosperity of a vineyard, KUB 35.2, Aškašepa and Pirwa were honored with a song in Luwian.

Aškašepa was worshiped as one of the deities belonging to the circle associated with Kanesh in Hattusa in the so-called "Great Temple". He apparently also had a temple of his own, as indicated by texts pertaining to the AN.TAḪ.ŠUM spring festival. As a member of the same group, he was venerated in Ištanuwa as well. Additionally, he is attested among deities worshiped during local festivals in Karaḫna, a city located on the middle run of the river Zuliya (Çekerek River).

In treaties between Šuppiluliuma I and Šattiwaza, Muršili II and Duppi-Tešub and Tudḫaliya IV and Šaušgamuwa, Aškašepa appears as one of the divine witnesses.
