= Šanta =

Anatolian war god

- Warrior god
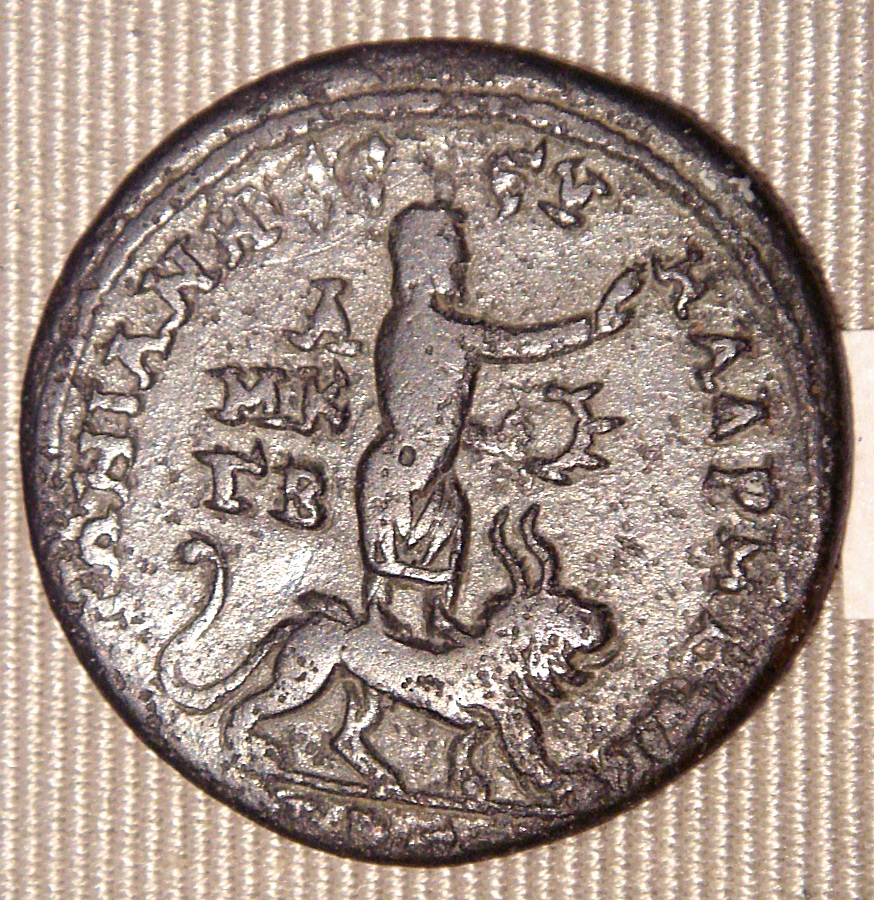
- Reverse of a bronze sesterce from Tarsus from the reign of Caracalla showing the local god with a horned lion.
- Other names: Sandas, Sandes, Sandon
- Major cult center: Tarsus
- Weapon: bow
- Animals: horned lion

Genealogy
- Spouse: Iyaya (disputed)

Equivalents
- Greek: Heracles

Šanta (Santa) was a god worshiped in Bronze Age Anatolia by Luwians and Hittites. It is presumed that he was regarded as a warlike deity, and that he could additionally be associated with plagues and possibly with the underworld, though the latter proposal is not universally accepted. In known texts he frequently appears alongside Iyarri, a deity of similar character. He is first attested in documents from Kanesh dated to the Old Assyrian period, and continues to appear in later treaties, ritual texts and theophoric names. He is also present in an offering lists from Emar written in Akkadian, though he did not belong to the local pantheon and rituals involving him were only performed on behalf of the Hittite administration by local inhabitants.

No references to Šanta are known from the centuries immediately following the fall of the Hittite Empire, but later Neo-Assyrian texts record theophoric names invoking which confirm he continued to be worshiped in the first millennium BCE. He is also attested in a number of Hieroglyphic Luwian inscriptions. He was regarded as the tutelary god of the city of Tarsus, and possibly as its mythical founder. He was also venerated further west, in Lydia. He is also attested in a variety of Greco-Roman sources, in which he was referred to as Sandas, Sandes or Sandon. In the process of interpretatio graeca he came to be regarded as the equivalent of Heracles, but there is no evidence that the two ever fully merged. A distinct tradition, possibly originating in Tarsus, presented him as one of the Titans instead.

In addition to certain attestations of Šanta, a number of similar theonyms and figures associated with Tarsus are sometimes argued to correspond to him, including the Aramaic deity Ba’altars, "Baal of Tarsus", as well as Zas, Zantas and Sandakos from Greco-Roman sources.

== Second millennium BCE attestations ==
=== Name and character ===
The original form of the name, Šanta, was written in cuneiform as ^{d}Ša-an-ta or ^{d}Ša-an-da. The diacritic is sometimes omitted in transcription, leading to spellings such as Santa or Sanda.

Annelies Kammenhuber described Šanta as a god of indeterminate Anatolian origin. According to Piotr Taracha, he was originally a Luwian deity. However, he is attested both in Luwian and Hittite religious texts. It has been proposed that his name is derived from the verb šā(i)-, "to be angry". Translations such as "the furious one" and "the angry one" have been suggested. However, this view is not universally accepted, and a non-Indo-European origin also cannot be ruled out. The proposal that this theonym is related to the name of the Hindu god Skanda is considered implausible. No references to Skanda predating the Mahabharata and Ramayana, which date at most to 400 BCE, are known.

The name Šanta could also be represented by the Sumerogram ^{d}AMAR.UTU, as attested in a series of Hittite-Luwian rituals (CTH 757). However, according to Gary Beckman, in most cases this logogram appears to refer to Marduk in Hittite archives, similar as in Mesopotamia. Most likely the logographic writing first developed in Kizzuwatna in the fourteenth and thirteenth century BCE, but the reasoning behind the choice of Marduk's name to represent Šanta remains unknown. Ian Rutherford notes that both gods were seemingly perceived as young and warlike. The view that Šanta could also be represented by the logogram ^{d}U.GUR is no longer regarded as valid. Michele Cammarosano suggests that sporadically the Akkadogram ^{d}ZABABA was used in place of the more frequent Sumerogram.

Little information about Šanta's character has been identified in sources from the Bronze Age. Manfred Hutter argues that the label of a "warrior god" is the most appropriate. H. Craig Melchert similarly describes him as "at least a warrior god, if not god of war". He was portrayed as armed with a bow and arrows. The ritual of Zarpiya in addition to highlighting a connection to war appears to also link him to plague. A link between him and the underworld has also been proposed, but this interpretation is not universally regarded as plausible. Alternate proposals in older scholarship include identifying Šanta as a vegetation god or a solar deity.

=== Associations with other deities ===
According to Piotr Taracha Iyaya, a goddess associated with springs, could be regarded as Šanta's wife. However, in Emar he was instead paired with Ḫandasima. According to Volkert Haas this deity corresponds to better attested Luwian Ḫantašepa, a type of deities believed to protector doorways, but according to Gary Beckman the origin of this theonym is not certain. Federico Giusfredi advises caution in interpreting the sources used to argue a connection existed between Šanta and Iyaya or Ḫandasima, as both are only attested with him once.

Šanta could also be associated with Iyarri, a war and plague deity. It is also possible that in situations where the Sumerogram representing Šanta is accompanied by ^{d}ZABABA in Hittite texts, Iyarri is meant by the latter. Both Šanta and Iyarri could be linked with a group of deities known as Marwainzi, "dark ones". In the so-called ritual of Zarpiya, Šanta appears alongside deities known in Hittite as Innarawanteš and in Luwian as Annarumenzi, "forceful ones". He is referred to as their king in this text. The character of his entourage is sometimes described as demonic. However, it has also been argued that the assumption that they were regarded negatively is the result of mistranslations. It has been noted that both of the groups of minor deities who could act as Šanta's assistants can be compared to the seven helpers of the Mesopotamian god Erra (the Sebitti).

=== Worship ===
Oldest known attestations of Šanta comes from the eighteenth century BCE. Theophoric names invoking him are already attested in texts from Kanesh from the Old Assyrian period. One example is Ša-ta-aḫ-šu-ša-ar.

The worship of Šanta among the Luwians is well documented. Most of the theophoric names invoking him are Luwian. According to Piotr Taracha, while there was no single Luwian pantheon, attestations of him are known from all areas inhabited by Luwians, similarly as in the case of major deities such as Tarḫunz, Arma, Tiwad, Iyarri, Kamrušepa or Maliya. He was present in a number of Luwian-influenced local pantheons in the basin of the Zuliya, presumed to correspond to the modern Çekerek River. He was also worshiped in Tapparutani, though this settlement is only known from a single document mentioning a statue representing him located there.

The oldest known Hittite source which mentions Šanta as a member of the state pantheon is a treaty between Šuppiluliuma I and Ḫukkana of Ḫayaša. However, overall he is only rarely attested as a divine witness in such documents. He is also present in a number of rituals connected with the worship of the deified sea.

Šanta is also attested in Akkadian texts from Emar in Syria. However, Anatolian deities did not belong to the local pantheon, and as summarized by Gary Beckman appear only in ritual texts documenting ceremonies "performed by the natives on behalf of the gods of their imperial masters". Šanta appears in an offering list headed by a weather god with the Luwian epithet puttalimmi (possibly "stormy") and the Sun god of Heaven as the recipient of a sacrificial sheep. Alfonso Archi suggests that Šanta's presence in this text is one of the pieces of evidence which might indicate that the compiler was a priest familiar with the traditions of Kizzuwatna, possibly stationed in Carchemish.

== Later attestations ==
=== Neo-Assyrian, Luwian and Lydian sources ===
While no sources mentioning Šanta are known from between the fall of the Hittite Empire and the early Neo-Assyrian period, it is agreed that in contrast with many other deities known from Bronze Age Anatolia he continued to be worshiped in the first millennium BCE. He served as the city god of Tarsus. This settlement is already attested in Hittite sources, where it was called Tarša (/Tarsa/). It is possible that the relative stability of this city and the surrounding areas were the reason behind the survival of his cult. He might have been regarded as the divine founder of this city, with Ammianus Marcellinus reference to a mortal founder of the city, a "rich man" named Sandas, being a late euhemeristic version of this tradition.

Neo-Assyrian sources mention a number of theophoric names invoking Šanta, including Sandauarri ("Šanta is my help"), a king of Kundi and Sissu during the reign of Esarhaddon, Sandasarme (a name combining the theonyms Šanta and Šarruma), a king of Hilakku contemporary with Ashurbanipal, and two individuals named Sandapi. He is also attested in a number of Hieroglyphic Luwian inscriptions. On the funerary stele of a certain Panuni he is invoked alongside the Marwinzi to protect this monument. According to John D. Hawkins, an inscription from Kululu mentioning a dead man feasting alongside Šanta might reflect a belief in meeting with gods in the afterlife, and as such is comparable to a similar contemporary text from Samʼal according to which king Panammu I hoped to feast with Hadad after dying. The so-called "Beirut bowl inscription" mentions him as the owner's personal deity, alongside Kubaba and Karhuha.

Šanta was also worshiped in Lydia, and in one curse formula identified in a funerary inscription written in Lydian he appears alongside Marivda (a cognate of Marwainzi) and Kubaba. It is also presumed that the name of Sandanis, a Lydian who according to Herodotus resided in Sardis as an advisor of Croesus, is theophoric and invokes Šanta. Further names invoking him have been identified in first millennium BCE and first millennium CE sources from various locations in Anatolia, with examples including Sandatis (from Corycus), Sandis (Caria), Sandon (Tarsus, Corycus, Anazarbus, Hamaxia, Olba, Seleukeia, Sivasti, Tynna), Sandazamis (Olba), Sandemias (Hamaxia); some appear as late as 524 CE, as evidenced by the example of Sandogenes from Anazarbus.

=== Greco-Roman reception ===
In Greco-Roman sources Šanta was referred to as either Sandas (Ionic: Sandes) or Sandon, though the latter form is only attested in a number of personal names and in the writings of John the Lydian. It might have originally developed in the third or second century BCE. John asserted that the name Sandas was derived from sandux, a type of garment, but it is presumed that this account does not reflect historical reality. The use of the form Sandan to refer to the god in some publications, influenced by James Frazer, is most likely incorrect, as in the only known text using it, attributed to Ammianus Marcellinus, it does not refer to a deity.

Sandas appears on Greco-Roman coins from Tarsus, with some of the individual known examples being dated to the reigns of Antiochus VII Sidetes and Caracalla. Typically he was depicted on them either alongside a structure conventionally referred to as the "Sandas monument" in scholarship, or alongside a horned lion. It has been suggested that the latter might have inspired the Greek chimera. Sandas might also be depicted on coins from Olba, though it is also possible that the figure shown on them is an unidentified local deity of similar character instead.

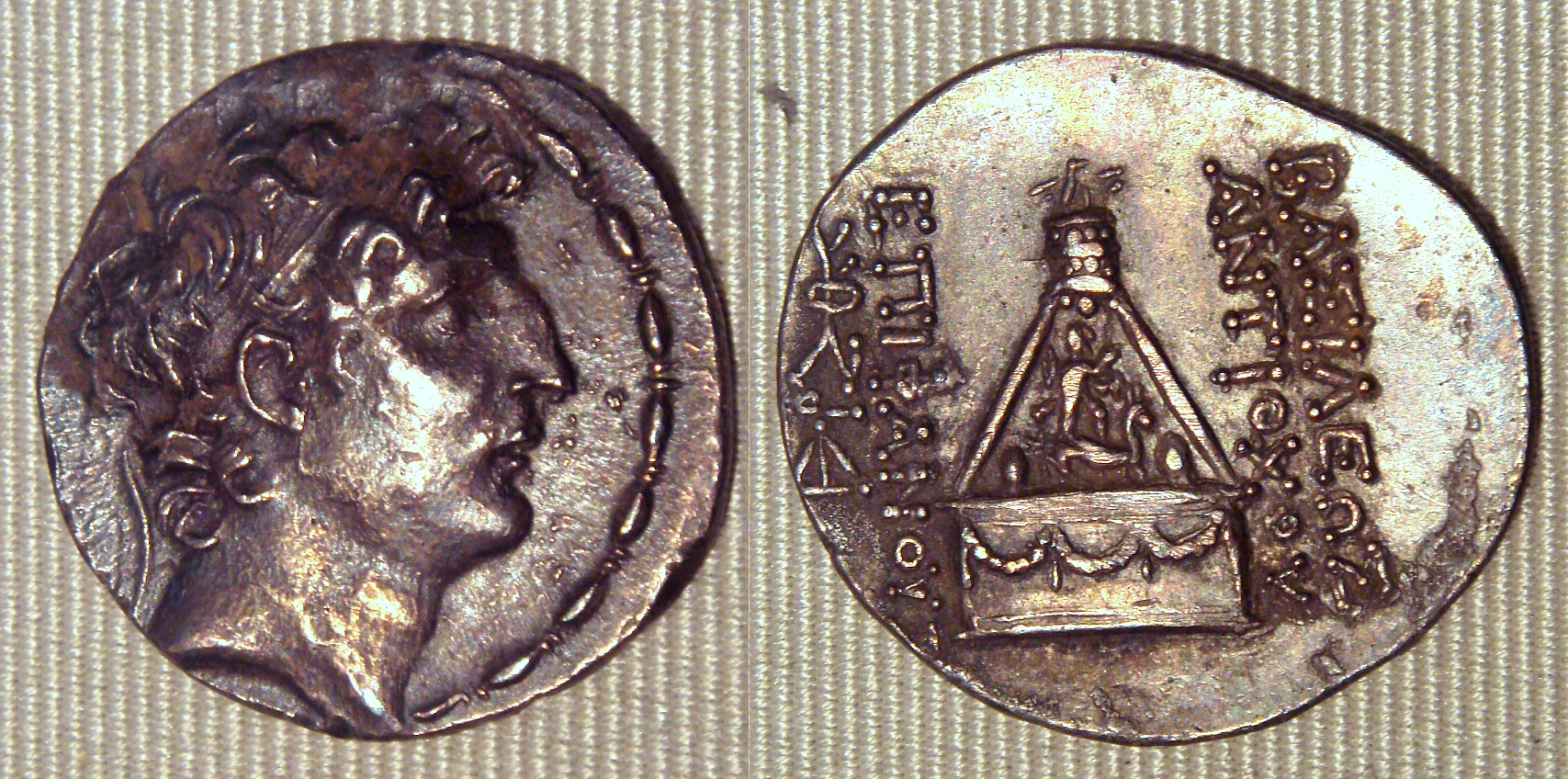
Coin of Antiochus VIII Grypus. Reverse: god Sandas standing on the horned lion, in his pyre surmounted by an eagle.

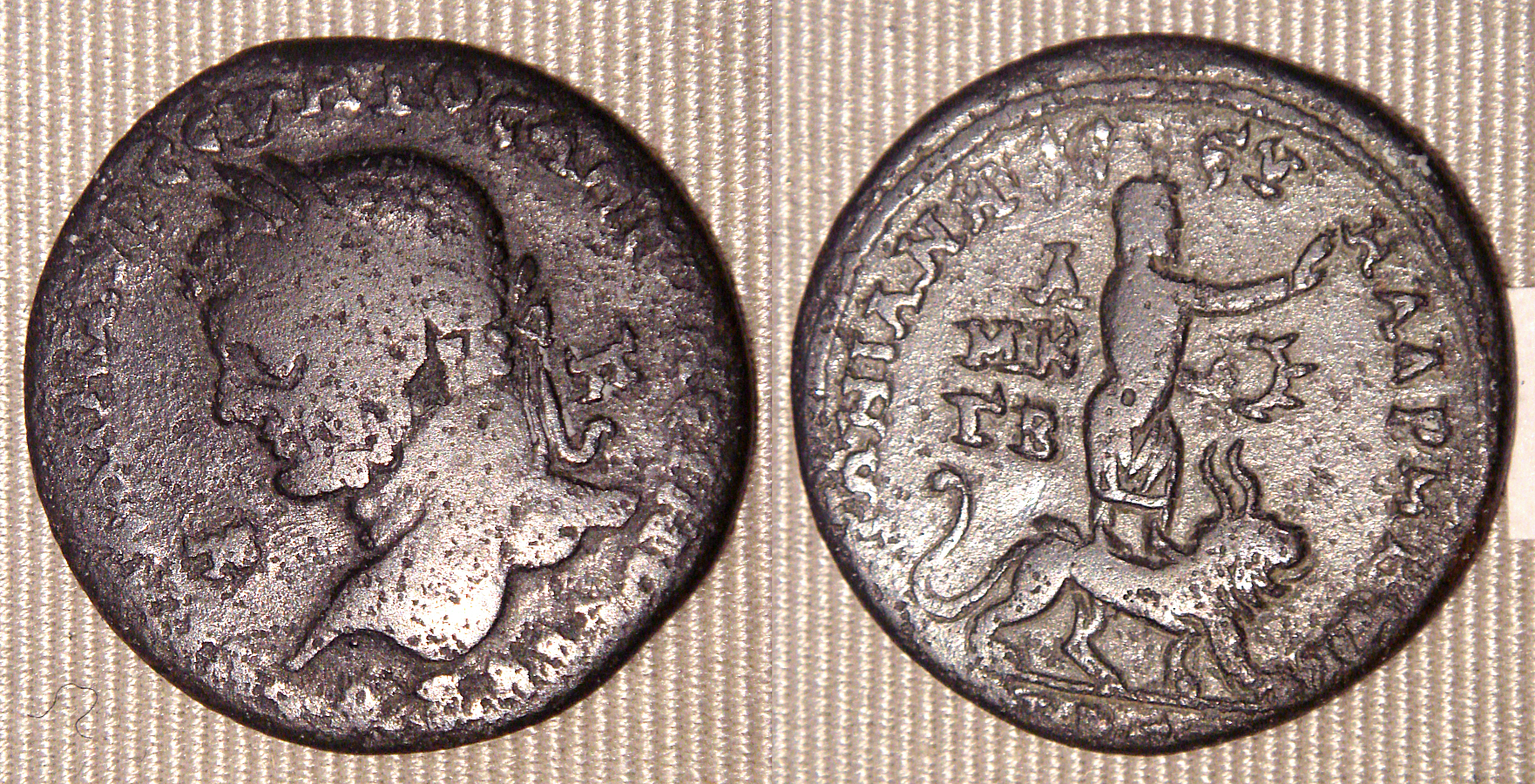
Bronze sesterce from Tarsus with bust of Caracalla (211–217) on the obverse, and Sandas on the reverse.

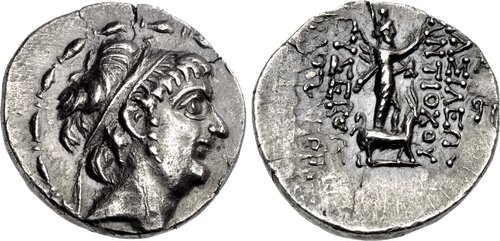
Coin of Antiochus X Eusebes depicting Sandas.

At least in Tarsus, Sandas could be identified with Heracles. This tradition might have been known in Lydia as well. Next to Malis, whose interpretatio graeca was Athena, he is one of the two only Bronze Age Anatolian deities who had well established Greek counterparts in later sources. The identification presumably relied on both figures being regarded as formidable warriors. However, much like the figure of Heracles himself, the identification between the two cannot predate the first millennium BCE, Volkert Haas dated its origin to the Hellenistic period. Oldest certain examples only go back to Roman times, though it might have already belonged to local tradition in the fourth century BCE. Nonnus in Dionysiaca equates Sandas with Heracles, but also with Morrheus (Morrhenos), possibly a late reflection of Marwainzi. At the same time, there is no evidence that Santas and Heracles were ever completely fused.

It has been argued that an annual festival in Tarsus apparently involved the preparation of a funerary pyre for Sandas. However, the existence of such a commemoration of his supposed immolation relies entirely on the assumption that a reference to a festival dedicated to the immolation of Heracles described by Lucian in Amores refers to a celebration from Tarsus originally focused on the local god. It has also been similarly argued that the Herakleia celebrated elsewhere in Cappadocia were a Hellenized form of an older festival of Sandas.

A distinct tradition presented Sandas as a titan, as attested indirectly in the writings of Dio Chrysostom and directly later in these attributed to Stephanos of Byzantium, where "Sandes" is the offspring of heaven and earth and brother of Cronus, Rhea, Iapetus, Adanos, Olumbros and Ostasos. Cronus, Rhea and Iapetus are well attested Hesiodic titans, while the other deities listed seem to be Cilician in origin: Adanos was the mythical founder of Adana, and based on the Karatepe bilingual inscriptions where king Azitawatas (the author of the Karatepe texts) speaks of himself as a lesser chieftain of the "Danuniyim" (the exact vocalization of the name is uncertain, but these people are the same as the Denyen (Danuna) mentioned in the 14th century BC in the Amarna letters) – his overlord "Awarkus" is given as the "king of the city of Adana" in the Hittite part of the text, while on the Phoenician side of the inscriptions he is described as "king of the Danuniyim" thus identifying the two names as virtually identical. A likely connection of the "Danuniyim" with the "Danaoi" of Greek mythology has been established, and as a consequence also between the eponymous founder of the Danaans, Danaus – and "Adanos". Olymbros might be related to Olybris, an epithet of Zeus, and similarly tied to a specific Cilician city (perhaps to be identified with Hittite Ellibra, referred to as Illubra in later Assyrian sources), while Ostasos remains poorly known but is presumed to have some connection to the same area. It is possible the portrayal of Sandas as a titan was a local tradition originating in Tarsus.

== Uncertain attestations ==
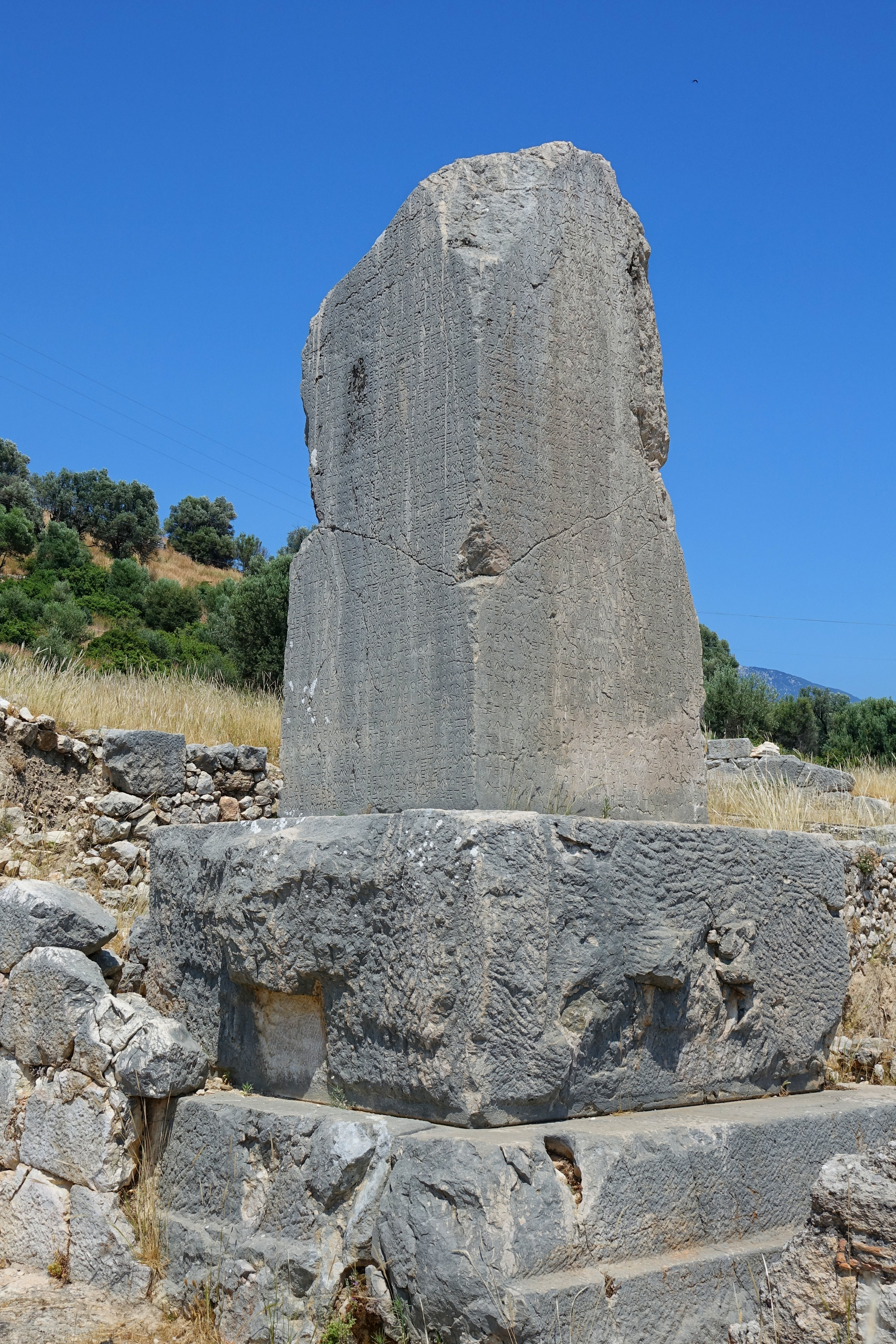
The Xanathos stele, inscribed with a text which might invoke a Lycian derivative of Šanta.

It has been proposed that the supposed theonym Santi, preserved in the London Medical Papyrus in a section written in an unknown language referred to as "Keftiu", is a form of the name Šanta.

H. Craig Melchert hypothesizes that a Lycian form of Šanta, Hãta, might be preserved on the Xanathos stele, with the recurring phrase hãtahe referring to dedications made to this god. Piotr Taracha accepts this interpretation as fact, while Manfred Hutter considers it a possibility.

It has been argued Arameans identified Šanta as the "Baal of Tarsus". A deity named Ba’altars, "Baal of Tarsus", is indeed attested in texts from this city from the period when it was under control of Persian satraps (fourth century BCE), but the deity might have instead been a reflection of a local form of Tarḫunz, possibly to be identified with Zeus Tersios mentioned in the third century BCE by Eratosthenes. A second possibility is that the Aramaic reflection of Sandas was also attested "Nergal of Tarsus", though despite similarity between the roles of these two gods in their respective pantheons this assumption is not universally accepted. It is also sometimes proposed that in the same location Šanta might have also been viewed as analogous to Phoenician Melqart, but no direct evidence in favor of this view exists, and while this god was known in Tarsus, he might have been identified with a different, presently unidentified local deity, who was treated as analogous to Bellerophon by Greek authors.

Zas and Zantos, theonyms known from the works of the sixth century BCE philosopher Pherecydes of Syros, might be derivatives of Šanta. Ian Rutherford has suggested that a tradition documented by Hellanicus according to which Heracles and Malis, in this context a slave of queen Omphale, were the parents of Akeles, might have originally been a local Lydian belief about Šanta and the goddess Malis, adapted as a variant of the tale of Heracles and Omphale. However, there is no evidence that these deities were associated with each other in the second millennium BCE.

A proposal that a connection existed between the name of Šanta and that of Sanerges, a deity belonging to the pantheon of the Bosporan Kingdom attested in sources from the late fourth century BCE, is not accepted by most researchers.

According to the Bibliotheca of Pseudo-Apollodorus, a possible euhemeristic derivative of Šanta, Sandakos, was the founder of Celenderis in Cilicia; he married Pharnace, daughter of Megassares, king of Hyrie, and became the father of the Cypriot king Cinyras. However, it is also possible that the name Sandakos was not derived from Šanta, and that it is etymologically related to the Semitic root ṣdq, "righteous", and by extension to the theonym Sydyk. It has been argued this explanation is supported by Pseudo-Apollodorus stating that he was a Syrian.
