= Maliya =

Hittite goddess of gardens

- Goddess of rivers, gardens and craftmanship
- Major cult center: Kanesh, Hattusa, Kummanni, Rhodiapolis

Equivalents
- Greek: Athena

Maliya was a goddess worshiped by Hittites in the Bronze Age. She was most likely a deified river in origin, but she was also associated with gardens and with artisanship, specifically with leatherworking and carpentry. The oldest attestations of her have been identified in the Old Assyrian texts from Kanesh. This city continued to be associated with her in later tradition, though she was also worshiped in Hattusa and elsewhere in the Hittite Empire. She is also present in texts originating in Kizzuwatna, which indicate she had a temple in Kummanni, where she was worshiped alongside various Hurrian deities.

It is assumed that a similarly named goddess attested in Lycian texts from the first millennium BCE corresponds to earlier Hittite Maliya. She was worshiped in Rhodiapolis and in other cities in Lycia, and might have been a war goddess. Malis, known from Lydian sources and from references in Greek literature, is also assumed to be a derivative of Maliya by most authors. A text from Lesbos describes her as a weaver. The Lycian and Lydian forms of Maliya were regarded as analogous to Greek Athena, though it remains a matter of debate among researchers how was the correspondence between them initially established. Malis also survived in Greek sources as the name of one of the naiads responsible for kidnapping Hylas, or alternatively as a slave of queen Omphale.

== Second millennium BCE ==
Maliya originally belonged to the pantheon of Kanesh (modern Kültepe). The oldest attestations of her name are theophoric names of women (for example Maliawasḫai) and toponyms (such as Malitta) mentioned in Old Assyrian texts from this site.

It is presumed that Maliya might have originally been the numen of the river sharing the same name, as indicated by the occasional spelling of her name in cuneiform with the determinative ÍD. It has been proposed that the river Maliya might correspond to either Parthenios (Παρθένιος) in historical Phrygia or to Melas (Μέλας) near Caesarea in Cappadocia. The etymology of the name is unclear. It has been argued in the past that Maliya can be considered "proto-Luwian", but according to Manfred Hutter's more recent study she did not have Luwian origin. Calvert Watkins proposes connecting her name with the noun māl-, "inner strength" or "mental force", attested both in Hittite and Luwian. This etymology is also accepted by Mary R. Bachvarova. Matilde Serangeli interprets Maliya's name as "goddess of thought" relying on a similar assumption. In early scholarship, attempts were made to prove Maliya was a Kassite deity in origin instead.

=== Hittite attestations ===
The worship of Maliya continued in Anatolia under the rule of the Hittites, and she is well attested in various Hittite sources. She was associated with water, especially with rivers, in Hittite tradition. An inventory tablet (KUB 38.33; line 5 on the obverse) mentions an iron statue of Maliya, described as a female river deity. She also functioned as a goddess of gardens. "Maliya of the Garden" is mentioned in the text KUB 42.23, which calls her the "mother of wine and grain". This hypostasis of the goddess received offerings alongside the vegetation god Telipinu. As a goddess responsible for the growth of plants she could also be invoked alongside Inara and the river goddess Šaḫiriya. An offering list from the reign of Tudḫaliya IV mentions a mountain deity named Maliya as well, possibly to be identified with Malimaliya known from other Hittite texts. However, the latter was a male deity. The corresponding mountain might be Mamu Dağ, located northeast of Tokat in Turkey. There is also evidence that Maliya was associated with leatherworkers. A community of leather workers and tanners dedicated to her lived close to a stream located in the proximity of the ašuša gate of Hattusa. The text IBoT 3.1 mentions a high ranking leatherworker offering a type of vessel used to store perfume (talla/i-) during a drinking rite of Maliya performed in front of the royal couple. An association between Maliya and carpenters is also attested. "Maliya of the Carpenter" was among the deities of the town Salluntassi.

In Hittite religion Maliya was traditionally associated with the city of Kanesh, and a "singer of Kanesh", who sung in the "Nesite" (Hittite) language was involved in a number of ceremonies dedicated to her. It is assumed that the Kaneshite deities formed the oldest stratum of Hittite religion, but it is possible that the later group of "gods of Kanesh" in rituals was a conglomerate of deities originally belonging to various traditions and that as a whole it did not necessarily reflect the composition of the earliest Hittite pantheon. In the oldest sources from Hattusa, Maliya's cult seemingly had a domestic character, but she also appears in the context of royal rituals after the rise of the Hittite Empire. She is mentioned for example in a text pertaining to a festival meant to secure good fortune for the house of a ruler and to guarantee him an heir and a prayer in which she is invoked alongside the Weather god of Nerik to help suffering petitioners. During the reign of Tudḫaliya IV the central location associated with her, as well as with the other deities of Kanesh, was the so-called "Great Temple" in this city. Deities from this group, including Maliya, as well as Pirwa and Aškašepa, were also worshiped in Ištanuwa. A different group, consisting of Maliya, a local storm god and ^{d}U.GUR (in this context possibly a logograpic spelling of the name of Zilipuri, a Hattian chthonic god from the circle of Lelwani, or less plausibly the Mesopotamian god Nergal) was seemingly worshiped in Ḫulaša. The existence of a city named after Maliya in Hittite times, while suggested in older literature, is now considered unproven.

Maliya was commonly associated with Kamrušepa, the goddess of magic and midwifery. In a narrative introduction to a healing formula, Maliya is one of the deities who make sure the information about the patient's state reaches Kamrušepa. In other Hittite sources, Maliya is accompanied by helpers known as Maliyanni, whose name is the plural of a diminutive form of her own name, Maliyanna, "little Maliya". According to Volkert Haas, similarly to other groups of deities whose names were constructed analogously, such as Ninattanni (Ninatta and Kulitta) or Šarrumanni, they should be considered a group of two. Piotr Taracha assumes that they were hypostases of Maliya herself. In one case, they appear in a ritual meant to secure the prosperity of a vineyard. Comparisons have been made between them and later Greek nymphs. Another group of deities associated with Maliya were the "male gods of Maliya" (^{d}maliyaš DINGIR.LÚ^{MEŠ}), presumed to be minor deities comparable to the concept of genius loci linked to specific natural features, for example rivers and springs, and possibly patterned on Hurrian traditions which reached the Hittite Empire through Kizzuwatna.

=== Luwian attestations ===
Maliya was incorporated into Luwian religion, and is one of the best attested goddesses worshiped by Luwians. Manfred Hutter assumes the information about her character provided by Hittite text can be assumed to apply to her in Luwian context as well. While according to Piotr Taracha it is incorrect to assume a single Luwian pantheon existed, some deities, including her, as well as the likes of Kamrušepa, Tarhunt, Tiwad, Arma, Iyarri and Šanta were nonetheless worshiped by all Luwian communities. She is best attested in texts from the south of Anatolia. She appears in Luwian context in sources from the basin of Zuliya (modern Çekerek River), though individual place names related to her are not preserved in most known documents. She is also present in an enumeration of deities of an unknown presumably Luwian city known from a Hittite offering list from the beginning of the imperial period.

=== Kizzuwatnean attestations ===
Maliya was also worshiped in the "Hurrianized" religion of Kizzuwatna, where she had a temple in the city of Kummanni. A partially preserved text states that it also housed the statues of six groups of other deities, including Ninatta and Kulitta, Hutena and Hutellura, a dyad referred to as Tiyabenti, Kuzzina-Kuzpazena, Kunizizi (paired with a deity whose name does not survive) and Ānnaliya (possibly mentioned alongside Išḫara). Kuzzina-Kuzpazena were a group of Hurrian deities associated with her in local tradition. According to Volkert Haas, they most likely functioned as her helpers.

In the texts from the reign of Puduḫepa which describe the annual ḫišuwa festival meant to guarantee the well-being of the royal family, Maliya is listed alongside other deities of Kummiya: "Teshub Manuzi", Lelluri, Išḫara, Allani and a pair of manifestations of Nupatik. Sussane Görke argues her presence in this text might be a result of Luwian influence, though she also remarks very little other evidence for it can be identified. The entire ceremony lasted nine days. Maliya is mentioned in the end of the tablet dealing with the second day, where a ritual ablution of her statue as well as a clothing ceremony during which it received a red garment and belt is described. Another one, describing the third day, mentions rites taking place in her temple. One of them involved a divine horse, Erama.

== First millennium BCE ==
While many deities belonging to various Bronze Age Anatolian pantheons ceased to be worshiped in the Iron Age, it is presumed to be derivatives of Maliya continued to be worshiped through the first millennium BCE. However, the connection between second and first millennium BCE evidence is not universally accepted, and due to apparent lack of similar functions Calvert Watkins argued the Hittite Maliya and similarly named later deities merely had homophonous names. Ian Rutherford, who unlike Watkins considers it plausible that the first millennium Maliya was identical with the goddess known from earlier sources, also stresses that her character is not identical.

=== Lycian attestations ===
Many attestations of Maliya are available from Lycia, where she was regarded as the tutelary goddess of Rhodiapolis. In this city, she was known under the epithet Wedrenni, while in Phelos she was called Eriyupama, possibly either "the highly exalted" or "who overcame the enemy", with the latter interpretation making it possible to interpret her as a warlike goddess. Trevor R. Bryce notes the view that the Lycian form of Maliya possessed such a role is also supported by an inscription from Xanthos and by a sarcophagus lid depicting her alongside Amazons in a battle scene. Maliya is also referenced in the tomb inscription of a certain Iyamara, which might designate him as the priest of this goddess. In some of the Lycian cities, Maliya was worshiped alongside the local weather god, Trqqas.

In Lycian tradition the Greek goddess Athena was understood as analogous to Maliya. The assimilation of the two might have been originally politically motivated, with a local dynasty aiming to adhere to a Greek cultural model. An inscription on a silver vase from Pithom decorated with a depiction of the judgment of Paris labels an Athena-like goddess as Maliya. The other figures are referred to with Lycian spellings of their Greek names, Pedrita (Aphrodite) and Aliχssa (Alexander = Paris). It is commonly assumed that the correspondence between Maliya and Athena relied on both goddesses having a Polias aspect, but the interpretation of the former's local epithet Wedrenni as "of the city" is now regarded as implausible in the light of discovery of Lycian terms for a city (teteri and minna, rather than wedri, the latter possibly meaning "country") and according to Eric Raimond a possibility is that it relied on analogous warlike function indicated respectively by the titles Eriyupama and Ptoliporthos ("who sacks cities", applied to Athena in the inscription on the Xanthian Obelisk). Ian Rhuterford instead assumes the equation might have been based on the influence of Rhodes, where Athena was a commonly worshiped deity (especially in Lindos), on Lycian culture of the fifth century BCE. A second possibility he considers is their shared characters as crafts goddesses. Matilde Serangeli, relying on a proposed etymology of Maliya's name, argues the equation might have been based on the connection between the meaning of her name, possibly connected to terms such as "thought" or "mental strength", with Athena's well attested role as a goddess of wisdom.

=== Lydian attestations ===
It is agreed that Maliya was a forerunner to the Lydian goddess Malis. She was understood as analogous to Greek Athena, as indicated by a Greek-Lydian bilingual text from Pergamon and by a number of literary references identified in works of authors such as Hipponax and Hesychius. The aforementioned bilingual is one of the only Lydian texts which were not found in the proximity of Sardis, and is substantially later than the rest of the corpus, with the most estimates dating it to the late fourth century BCE, specifically to the period between 330 and 325 BCE based on the fact that it mentions that a certain Paitaras was a donor responsible for funding the column it was inscribed on, erected during the construction of the local temple of Athena. Paitaras is not known from any other sources, though the fact his dedication is bilingual might indicate that Pergamon had an influential and prosperous Lydian community at the time.

While Greek literary tradition presents the kings of Lydia as sponsors of the cult of Athena, she does not appear in sources from Sardis predating the rule of the Attalid dynasty (180 - 133 BCE) and therefore it has been proposed that such attestations can reflect traditions pertaining to the cult of Malis from before the period of Hellenization.

=== Greek attestations ===
Multiple references to Malis are also known from Greek sources. Based on attested Greek spellings of her name is presumed Greek authors learned about her from Lydian sources, rather than Lycian or Luwian. However, the degree to which they were familiar with her remains uncertain. Ian Rutherford compares her case to that of Sandas, and with less certainty to Kubaba, who also retained a degree of relevance after the second millennium BCE, and continued to be referenced in Greek texts.

A literary fragment from Lesbos portrays Malis (Μᾶλις) as a weaver, and according to Annick Payne might be an indication the goddess was also worshiped by Greeks. Rutherford notes that if this description reflects an Anatolian tradition, it might have been the reason behind the frequent equation between Malis and Athena, though he also considers it possible that it was a Greek invention relying on a preexisting equation. At the same time, he tentatively speculates that since the myth of Arachne is not recorded in sources predating Ovid, according to whom the contest between the mythical weavers took place in Hypaepa in Lydia, it might have originally been a Lydian myth about Malis, if the hypothesis that she was a weaver goddess is accepted. Payne in her analysis of available evidence notes that a figurine of a weaver in Lydian headwear found at Ephesus might also be evidence of Greek worship of Malis as a deity of such character. Hipponax, an early Greek poet who apparently spoke both Greek and Lydian, left behind a short invocation addressed to Malis (Μαλὶς):

O Malis, help me (?), and since it is my lot to have a demented master I beg of you that I not get a beating.

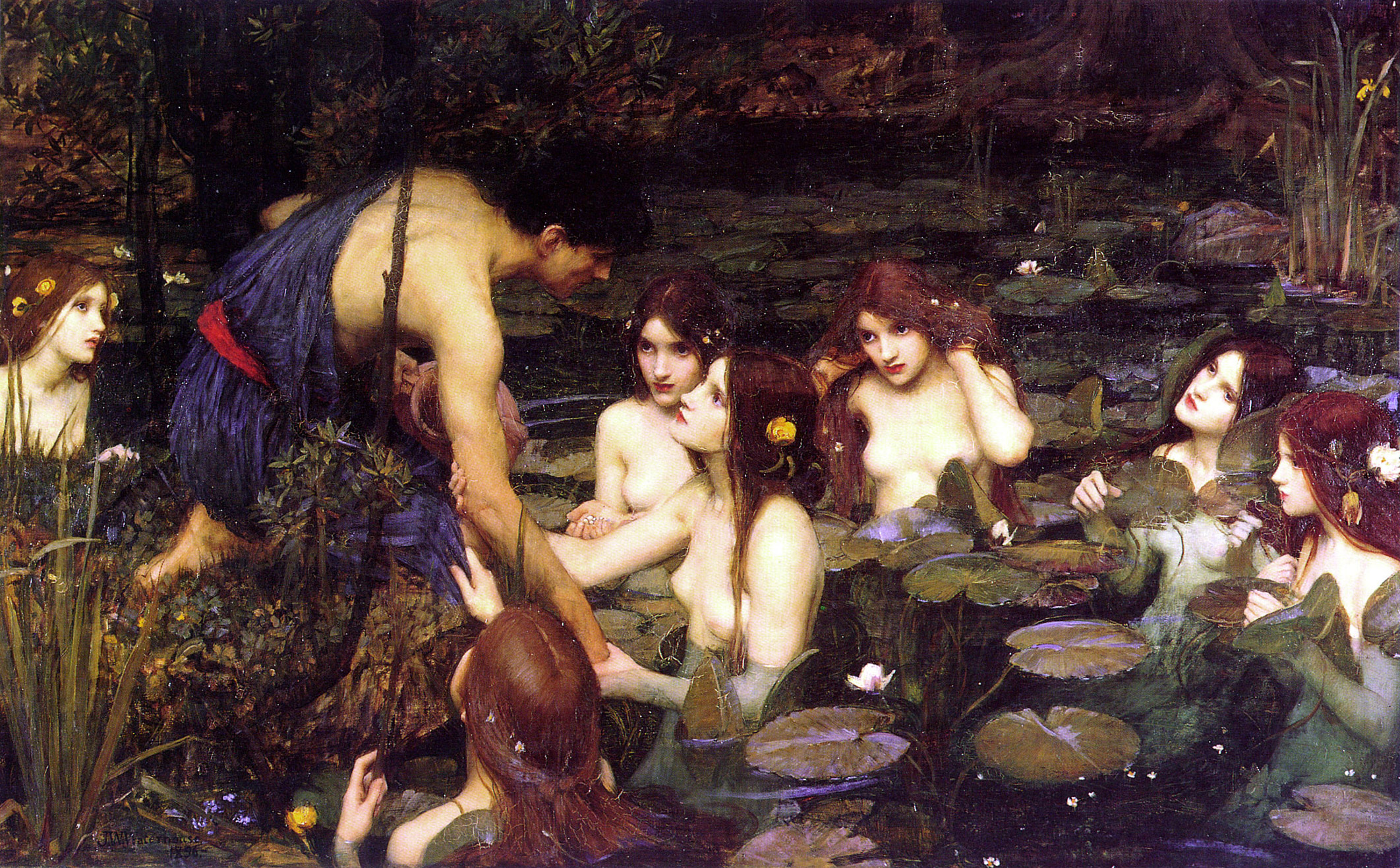
Hylas and the Nymphs (1896) by John William Waterhouse

A water nymph (naiad) named Malis (Μαλίς) is attested in Theocritus' Idylls. Alongside two other nymphs, Eunika and Nicheia, she resided in Kios on Propontis, and together they were responsible for the abduction of Hylas. Ian Rutherford notes that view that Malis was a river nymph appears to align with the original role of Maliya as a river goddess. Sophocles in the play Philoctetes mentions a plurality of nymphs with a similar name, Maliades (Μαλιάδες) from the river Spercheios. However, according to Rutherford, they are most likely not related to the singular Malis, and should be assumed to be connected to Malis in Greece instead.

In a different Greek tradition Malis, while associated with Lydia, was only regarded as a slave of Omphale, a mythical queen of this realm. This view can be found in the works of Stephanus of Byzantium and Hellanikos. According to the latter of these two authors, she had a son with Heracles, Akeles, which might reflect a tradition in which the goddess Malis was worshiped alongside Sandas, an Anatolian god identified with the Greek hero, though there is no certain evidence in favor of this interpretation, and no known texts from the second millennium BCE associate them with each other.

Attempts have been made to connect the supposed theonym Damalis, present in Life and Miracles of Saint Thecla from the first century CE alongside Sandas, to Malis, but they are not regarded as plausible, and the "city of Sandas and Damalis" mentioned in this text might be a reinterpretation of Dalisandos in Isauria.
