= Iyaya =

Hittite and Luwian goddess

- Spring goddess
- Major cult center: Lapana, Tiura
- Animals: mountain sheep

Genealogy
- Spouse: possibly Šanta

Iyaya was a Hittite and Luwian goddess. Her functions remain uncertain, though it has been suggested she was associated with water or more broadly with nature. She might have been associated with the god Šanta, though the available evidence is limited. Her main cult centers were Lapana and Tiura, though she was also worshiped in other cities.

== Name and character ==
The precise origin of Iyaya's name cannot be established, though it is agreed that it was neither Hattic nor Hurrian in origin. In scholarship she has been described both as a Hittite and Luwian goddess.

Not much is known about Iyaya's specific role in the Hittite pantheon. She has been described as a spring goddess, and as a deity responsible for dispensing water. A Hittite text listing the statues of various deities describes her as accompanied by two mountain sheep. The presence of animals might indicate she was a nature deity.

== Associations with other deities ==
According to Piotr Taracha, it can be assumed that Iyaya was regarded as the wife of Šanta. An inventory of sacred objects from the otherwise unknown settlement Tapparutani mentions a depiction of both deities together, with Iyaya portrayed seated and Šanta standing next to her. However, no other evidence for an association between them exists, and Federico Giusfredi has questioned if assumptions can be made based on this isolated reference. Gary Beckman accepts the existence of a connection between Šanta and Iyaya, but he points out that it was seemingly not recognized in Emar, where this god instead appears alongside Ḫandasima.

In some locations Iyaya was worshiped alongside the spring goddess Kuwannaniya. (Note: Kuwannaniya is attested as a name of multiple springs in Hittite sources.) It is presumed these two goddesses were closely linked. It has been suggested that Iyaya was also a spring goddess herself.

== Worship ==
Iyaya is best known from a genre of Hittite texts conventionally referred to as "cult inventories"/ They were supposed to present the state of a specific deity's cult in a specific settlement. Her two cult centers were Lapana (Note: Not to be confused with a homophonous city from the Amarna Letters, which corresponds to modern Lebweh)) and Tiura, where according to Volkert Haas she was the main local deity. A statue representing her was kept in the former of these two settlements. A detailed description is preserved alongside other information about her local cult:

The town Lapana, (chief deity) Iyaya: the divine image is a female statuette of wood, seated and veiled, one cubit (in height). Her head is plated with gold, but the body and throne are plated with tin. Two wooden mountain sheep, plated with tin, sit beneath the deity to the right and left. One eagle plated with tin, two copper staves, and two bronze goblets are on hand as the deity's cultic implements. She has a new temple. Her priest, a male, is a holdover.

In Tiura Iyaya was served by a ^{MUNUS}AMA.DINGIR-LIM priestess. She was also worshiped in Annitešša. A text from the reign of Tudḫaliya IV (KUB 12.2) indicates that she was additionally venerated in northern Anatolia in a city whose name is not preserved in the form of a ḫuwaši stele alongside deities such as Kuwannaniya, Milku, Iyarri, Sun goddess of the Earth, the weather god of Nerik and the weather god of Assur. She is also present in rituals focused on the worship of the deified sea mentioning the Mediterranean Sea and the tarmana sea, possibly the Gulf of Iskenderun.

Iyaya is also attested as a theophoric element of personal names. One possible example is the name of queen Iyaya, wife of Zidanta II. It has also been proposed that at least in feminine names, the element iya might be a shortened form of the theonym Iyaya, though it might also correspond to a deity derived from Mesopotamian Ea. The latter view is more common in scholarship.

Attilio Mastrocinque suggests that Iyaya might be mentioned in an inscription written in Greek on a gem found in Verona dated to the Roman period which contains the word yoyo (υουο), which he interprets as a late variant of her name, but according to Ian Rutherford this proposal is implausible.
