= Koloe (Lydia) =

Coordinates: 38°13′33″N 28°12′29″E

Koloe (Ancient Greek: Κολόη) was a town of ancient Lydia, inhabited during Roman and Byzantine times.

Its site is located near Kiraz in Asiatic Turkey.
