= Ištanuwa =

Town in Bronze Age Anatolia

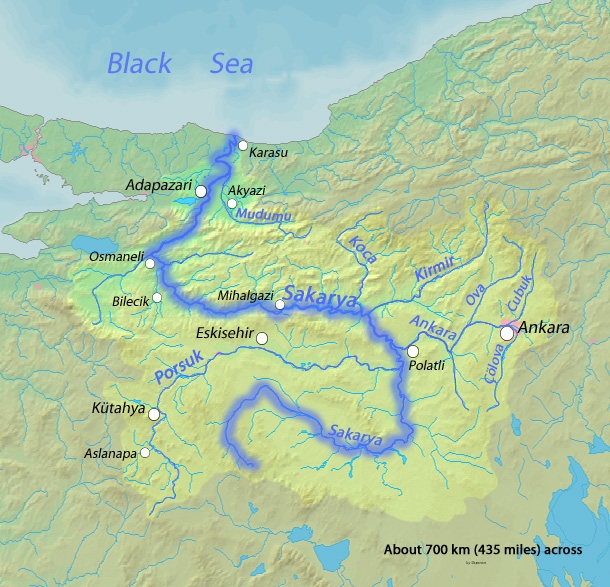
Šaḫiriya river valley

Ištanuwa was a town in Bronze Age Anatolia located along the Šaḫiriya river and known to the Hittites as the site of a regional religious festival. Its inhabitants were Luwic speakers. Cultic practices associated with the town are believed to have been antecedents of the same tradition that spawned the Iliad and the Odyssey.

== Etymology ==
The toponym Ištanuwa is named only in the Luwian ritual texts known as the Songs of Ištanuwa and the Songs of the Men of Lallupiya. Woudhuizen regarded it as an Arzawan word that originated before "the infiltration of Thracian and Phrygian population groups" ultimately derived from the Indo-Iranian root istan ("land") and the foreign ethnic designation nuwā-um ("Luwian"). Laroche believed it was a Hittite word that "must be derived from that of the Anatolian Sun deity" Istanu and the nominal stem -wa so prominent in Taurisan Luwian. An alternate spelling of Aštanuwa is found in Assyrian records.

== Language ==
The language of Ištanuwa is now understood as a dialect of luwili, perhaps influenced by an unknown Arzawan language. Called ištanumnili by the Hittites, it lacked some of the innovative forms (genitive plural and related adjectives) of luwili and appears to have been regarded as a separate language.

== Geography ==
Ištanuwa was located "in the Luwian-speaking territories west and southwest of Hatti proper," near the Sakarya River in classical Phrygia at or near Gordion.

== History ==
There are thirty-six texts dated to the 1500s BC which mention Ištanuwa, all of which contain Hittite descriptions of the men of the town undertaking religious rituals or celebrations and/or the gods of the polity themselves. The opening line of one song - "When they came to steep Wilusa" has been interpreted to suggest a Luwian counterpart to the Homeric traditions of Ancient Greece, where "the Hittites participated in the network of traveling poets who were the ancestors of the poets working in the oral tradition that eventually produced the Illiad."

Certain rituals have been linked to the subsequent Greek cult of Cybele. The town seems to have been a regional cult center, with a local festival lasting several days. The appearance of the Hittite great king and queen suggests a corresponding festival at Hattusa attended by the men of Ištanuwa. The religious celebrations included chants in the local dialect as well as specific ritual conduct:

This text describes a very odd rite involving a physician who pierces himself with two needles. He dances and turns and then only draws the needles out of his body and drinks wine. Then he pierces other persons with the needles. As far as we know, this rite is unparalleled in the Hittite literature. It is very tempting to believe that it is a very local ritual tradition, although we cannot prove it.

Some of the deities attested for Istanuwa included the grain god Warwaliya, the wine god Winiyanda, the dancing god Tarwaliya, the field god Immaršiya, the trade god Iyašalla, the protective god Runtiya, the plague god Iyarri and the garden goddess Maliya.

The tyoponym Ištanuwa disappeared with the emergence of the Phrygians, either already resident west of the Šaḫiriya river or in the process of immigrating from Thrace and Macedonia.
