= Iyarri =

Ancient Anatolian deity

- God of plague and war
- Major cult center: Guršamašša, Ḫarranašši
- Weapon: Bow and arrows
- Animals: Dog
- Mount: Lion

Equivalents
- Mesopotamian: Erra

Iyarri, also known as Yarri, was a god worshiped by Hittites and Luwians in Anatolia in the Bronze Age. He was associated with plague and war, and was portrayed as an archer whose arrows inflicted people with illnesses. While it is generally assumed that Iyarri was male, a female form of this deity is mentioned in a single text. It has been proposed that Iyarri might have developed from the Mesopotamian god Erra, or that he was influenced by him. A different proposal considers his name a cognate of that of Greek Ares, though the evidence in favor of this view is not conclusive.

Evidence of the worship of Iyarri in Hittite religion and Luwian religion comes mostly from central Anatolia, and includes documents such as oath formulas, treaties and descriptions of rituals. Temples dedicated to him existed in Ḫarranašši and Guršamašša. He is also attested in a number of theophoric names. References to him postdating the fall of the Hittite Empire are infrequent, and it has been proposed he was eventually replaced by a similar god, Šanta.

== Character ==
Iyarri was associated with plague and war. He was believed to cause epidemics, and was therefore also invoked in hopes of halting their spread. The widespread view that he was a war god is based on his portrayal as an armed deity, on a text from the reign of Muršili II invoking him as a helper of the king in battle, and on his placement in various lists of deities, where he usually appears in the proximity of gods designated by the Sumerogram ZABABA. It is possible that in some cases his own name was represented by it. For example, it is possible that his name is written this way in a text from Katapa from the final years of Muršili II's reign, as the deity represented by it appears alongside Šanta and the Sun goddess of the Earth in KBo 47.76. An anonymous war god worshiped in Ḫubešna (modern Ereğli), the cult center of the goddess Ḫuwaššanna, has tentatively been identified as Iyarri too.

The attributes of Iyarri were a bow and arrows. He could be referred to as the "lord of the bow", EN ^{GIŠ}PAN, as attested in the treaty between Šuppiluliuma I and Šattiwaza, a king of Mitanni. A ritual against an illness which at one point afflicted the Hittite army (KUB 7.54) mentions his weapons in relation to his role as a plague god. Seemingly his arrows were believed to bring plague. It was believed that he could be convinced to attack the enemies rather than the inhabitants of the land of Hatti with them. Iyarri was also associated with dogs. A single text mentions that he could be depicted riding on a lion.

Volkert Haas noted that there is some evidence for Iyarri's gender being inconsistent, with both a male depiction and a female one attested, though he nonetheless referred to him as a male deity. As of 2022, only a single text mentioning female Iyarri is known, KUB 15.5+, a description of a dream omen involving this deity in which she is described as a woman in a head scarf. Due to the nature of the text it has been called into question if it accurately reflects contemporary religious practice and iconography of Iyarri, although Alexander T. Millington states that such an approach is "not tenable" as the account according to him is not a "literary fantasy" and should be considered accurate.

== Associations with other deities ==
In both Hittite and Luwian sources, Iyarri was sometimes paired with Šanta, a god of similar character, and both of them could be invoked alongside a group of deities known as Marwainzi, "dark ones". They were also known under the Hittite name Markuwaya (Marwainzi being a Luwian term), and additionally could be represented by the logogram ^{d}IMIN.IMIN.BI ("heptad"). In treaties from the reign of Šuppiluliuma I, Iyarri appears alongside Zappana, another plague god. There is no indication in known texts that any other deities belonged to his circle.

It has been noted that both the name and character of Iyarri resembled those of the Mesopotamian god Erra. Volkert Haas outright identified them with each other. Maciej Popko and Alfonso Archi consider it plausible that Iyarri developed under the influence of Erra, with the latter author assuming the Anatolian theonym was derived from the Mesopotamian one.

A connection between Iyarri and Greek Ares has been suggested, though it remains uncertain. Proponents of the view that these two gods shared a similar origin, such as Vladimir Georgiev and János Harmatta, argue that both of their names go back to an Indo-European root, yōris or yāris, possibly "uproar" or "violence", but this proposal is not universally accepted, and the root in mention is only attested in Balto-Slavic languages (including Lithuanian, Russian and Old Church Slavonic), with no confirmed examples from any other branches, and as such might it might be insufficiently ancient for this theory to be valid. Furthermore, there is no certainty that Iyarri's name was derived from a root present in any Indo-European languages, as if the view that he developed from the god Erra is accepted, his name originated in a Semitic language. Said theonym goes back to the root ḥrr, "to scorch", attested for example in Akkadian. Alexander T. Millington notes that a further obstacle is the fact that while both Iyarri and Ares are routinely described as "war-gods" in modern scholarly literature, their individual character differs, with Ares being understood as effectively synonymous with war, rather than as a deity capable in helping individuals during it, in contrast with Iyarri, and there is no evidence that he was ever invoked specifically during wars. Furthermore, Ares was not regarded as a plague god. There is also no evidence that any of the attested examples of local Ares cults in Anatolia, many of which are known from areas such as Caria, Cilicia, Isauria and Lycia, represented a juxtaposition of the Greek name and a preexisting cult of Iyarri, though some of them might have combined the Greek god with older elements derived from a variety of local deities, as originally proposed by Louis Robert. Millington notes that a possible exception is the existence of a cult of Areia, if the name is to be understood as a feminine form of Ares rather than a cognate epithet, as such a goddess could possibly be a Greek reflection of a vestigial version of the female aspect of Iyarri. Areia is attested in texts from Isauropolis from the Roman imperial period.

Iyarri's role of a bow-armed plague god has also been compared to Apollo's portrayal in the Iliad.

== Worship ==
The worship of Iyarri is best attested from cities from central Anatolia and from areas inhabited by Luwians. Piotr Taracha considers him a god of Luwian origin, though one who was also incorporated into many local Hittite pantheons. Since he is absent from sources showing Hurrian influence, it is assumed that even if his origin was foreign, he did not reach Anatolia through Hurrian mediation. According to Taracha, while it is impossible to speak of a uniform Luwian pantheon, Iyarri can nonetheless be considered one of the best attested deities worshiped by Luwians, comparable in importance to Tarḫunz, Tiwad, Arma, Maliya, Šanta or Kamrušepa. He is attested for example in texts pertaining to the local pantheon of the western city of Ištanuwa.

A temple of Iyarri existed in a city known as Ḫarrana or Ḫarranašši, as indicated by the document CTH 260, which states that king Arnuwanda I desposted tablets inscribed with oaths of officials from Kinnara there. Another temple dedicated to the same god was located in Guršamašša. A festival focused on him which took place in this city involved a ritual reenactment of a battle between the armies of Hatti and the "men of Maša".

Iyarri was commonly invoked in oaths, for example in various Hittite treaties. In Ura, people had to drink from a rhyton dedicated to him when taking an oath involving him, while an instructive text from the reign of Tudḫaliya IV, KUB 26.24+, mentions the preparation of three copies of a bronze oath tablet which had to be presented to Iyarri in Hattusa, Arinna and Ḫartana. In a ritual associated with the last of these cities, KUB 38.32, he is one of the three main deities next to the deified mountain Ziwana and a local weather god associated with the same landmark.

Attested theophoric names invoking Iyarri, examples of which include Iyarra-muwa, Iyarra-piya, Iyarra-zalma and Iyarra-ziti, exclusively combine this theonym with elements from Anatolian languages, though Alfonso Archi notes this does not necessarily rule out an origin in another area, as linguistically Anatolian names invoking deities such as Šauška or Ḫepat are also known, and reflect the fact that these deities were integrated into local culture rather than their origin.

It is possible that eventually Iyarri was eventually superseded by Šanta, as the latter appears much more commonly in sources from the first millennium BCE. There is little, if any, evidence for the worship of the former continuing after the fall of the Hittite Empire, and he is entirely absent from later hieroglyphic Luwian texts, with the only exception being two possible theophoric names, Yariris (tge regent of Carchemish in late ninth of early eighth century BCE) and Iyara/isa/i (attested on an eighth century BCE artifact from Kululu). However, no examples of the latter are known from later Greco-Roman sources, and while a connection between names with the element Iya- and Iyarri has been proposed, they might also be related to deities such as Iyaya or Iya (derived from Mesopotamian Ea) instead.
