= Manfred Hutter =

German academic (born 1957)

Manfred Hutter (born 6 June 1957) is a professor at Bonn University. He is usually interested in writing about minority religions, comparative religions and pre-Islamic Arabia.

Manfred Hutter understands scientific studies of religions decidedly as a human-scientific and empirically working discipline of cultural studies, because it understands religion as a partial aspect of culture and examines the interactions between man, culture and society. Therefore, he pleads for a formal and substantive demarcation of the subject from theology and philosophy of religion. For him, religious studies consists of both historical and systematic approaches, since one cannot carry out a comparative systematization without sound historical and philological basic knowledge. The comparison across religious and national borders is for him the added value of religious studies compared to regional studies, which also deal with religions. In this way, for example, "niche products" are made visible that hardly receive any attention in regional studies, as can be seen in his studies on Hinduism in Southeast Asia, on forms of Christianity in Asia, and on small Jewish communities in Thailand, Myanmar and Cambodia.

== Works ==
- Die Religion der Hethiter: ihre Rolle für den Alten Orient und für das AT, 1986
- Die Bahá?í, 1994
- Religionswissenschaft im Kontext der Asienwissenschaften: 99 Jahre religionswissenschaftliche Lehre und Forschung in Bonn, 2009
- Die Weltreligionen, 2011
- Between Mumbai and Manila: Judaism in Asia since the Founding of the State of Israel, 2013
- Religionsgeschichte Anatoliens. Vom Ende des dritten bis zum Beginn des ersten Jahrtausends, 2021
- Der Manichäismus. Vom Iran in den Mittelmeerraum und über die Seidenstraße nach Südchina, 2023
- Religionsgeschichte, 2025
