= Çekerek River =

River in northern Turkey

Coordinates: 40°33′41″N 35°45′17″E

The Çekerek River (Turkish: Çekerek Çayı, ancient Scylax) is a tributary of the Yeşil River in Turkey. It flows for about 270 km (170 mi) in a "southwest-northeast arc". Its source is near Tokat. The confluence with the Yeşil is just to the southeast of the village of Kayabaşı.

The ancient Bronze-Age Hittite site of Maşat Höyük, not far from Zile, lies near the banks of the Çekerek. It was occupied at least as early as the Middle Kingdom period in 1420-1340 BC, as military reports have been unearthed there.

The Çekerek, Yeşil and Delice rivers provide for a rich agriculture in the region. On the Kümbet Ova plain, the river allows the cultivation of wheat, onions, sugar beets and other vegetables and fruit.
