= Barri (disambiguation) =

Barri is a mythical place where Freyr and Gerðr are to consummate their union.

Barri may also refer to:

== Places ==
- Barri Sharqi Subdistrict, a Syrian Subdistrict in the Salamiyah District in Hama
  - Barri Sharqi, a town in northern Syria
  - Barri al-Gharbi, a Syrian village located in the Barri Sharqi Subdistrict
- Tell Barri, a tell in north-eastern Syria in the Al-Hasakah Governorate
- Barri Gujar, a village in the Bhopal district of Madhya Pradesh, India
- Barri settlement, a settlement located in Gombe State, Nigeria
- Barri Chiefdom, a chiefdom in Pujehun District of Sierra Leone

== People ==
- Barri (surname)

== Species ==
- Acmaeodera barri, a species of metallic wood-boring beetle in the family Buprestidae
- Apiocera barri, a species of fly in the family Apioceridae
- Caecidotea barri, a species of crustacean in the family Asellidae
- Cortodera barri, a species of longhorn beetle in the genus Cortodera
- Hadenoecus barri, a species of camel cricket in the family Rhaphidophoridae
- Nesticus barri, a species of true spider in the family Nesticidae
- Orconectes barri, a species of crayfish in the family Cambaridae
- Pterostichus barri, a species of woodland ground beetle in the family Carabidae
- Stygobromus barri, a troglomorphic species of amphipod in family Crangonyctidae

== See also ==
- Barr (disambiguation)
