= Nabarbi =

Hurrian goddess

- Goddess of pastures
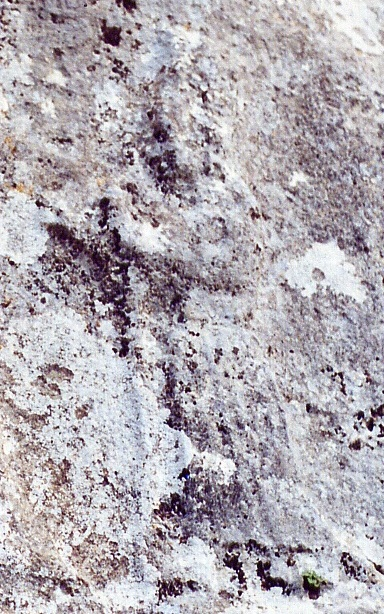
- A relief of Nabarbi from the Yazılıkaya sanctuary.
- Major cult center: Taite

Genealogy
- Spouse: Tašmišu

Equivalents
- Mesopotamian: possibly Belet Nagar

Nabarbi or Nawarni was a Hurrian goddess possibly associated with pastures. She was one of the major deities in Hurrian religion, and was chiefly worshiped in the proximity of the river Khabur, especially in Taite. It has been proposed that she was associated with the goddess Belet Nagar, linked to the Upper Mesopotamian city of Nagar. In addition to being venerated in Hurrian religion, she was also incorporated into the beliefs of the Hittites and into the local pantheon of Emar. She also continued to be worshiped in Taite in the Neo-Assyrian period, as attested in a text from the reign of Ashurbanipal, where she is one of the deities invoked to bless the king.

== Name and character ==
Attested spellings of the theonym Nabarbi in cuneiform include ^{d}na-bar-bi (widespread in Hittite texts), ^{d}na-a-bar-bi, ^{d}na-a-bar-wi, ^{d}naa-wa-ar-wee, ^{d}na-bar-WA and ^{d}na-wa-ar-ni. Alfonso Archi interprets it as "she of Nawar", with the toponym derived from Hurrian naw, "pasture". Volkert Haas directly translates it as "she of the pasture", and suggests she might have been associated with cattle pastures. She also played a role in ritual purification, as indicated by the itkalzi rituals.

=== Nabarbi and Belet-Nagar ===
Piotr Taracha argues that Nabarbi was identical with the "lady of Nagar" attested in Mesopotamian sources from the Ur III period, with Nagar and Nawar being two spellings of the same toponym according to his proposal. He considers her one of the deities received by Hurrians from preexisting Syrian pantheons, Alfonso Archi does not consider Nagar and Nawar to be two spellings of the same toponym, but he states it is possible Nabarbi was identified both with the "lady of Nagar" and with Ḫabūrītum, a goddess associated with the river Khabur also attested in Mesopotamian sources from the Ur III period. He also points out the tutelary goddess of Nagar appears alongside Hurrian deities in the inscriptions of Hurrian king Tish-atal of Urkesh.

In early scholarship the view that Nabar might be an uncommon spelling of the toponym Nippur was also present, which lead to the proposal that Nabarbi was related to Ninnibru, "Lady of Nippur", a name used to refer to the wife of Ninurta in the Ur III and Isin-Larsa period.

=== Structurally similar theonyms ===
It has been pointed out that Nabarbi's name is structurally similar to that of Kumarbi, "he of Kumar". The structure of these two names has been used as an argument in favor of restoring the name ḫrḫb from the Ugaritic myth Marriage of Nikkal and Yarikh, written in the local alphabetic script, as Ḫiriḫibi, "he of the mountain Ḫiriḫ(i)," (Note: Both this god and the myth he appears in are assumed to have Hurrian origin.) On the same basis it has been argued that the god Aštabi had Hurrian origin. However, subsequent research has shown that the original spelling of his name was Aštabil, and that he was already worshiped in Ebla before the arrival of Hurrians in Syria. (Note: It is possible that he instead originated in a religious and linguistic substrate absorbed first by the Eblaites and then by Hurrians, similarly to Išḫara.)

== Associations with other deities ==
Tašmišu was regarded as the husband of Nabarbi, as was Šuwaliyat, his Hittite counterpart. Volkert Haas argues that the pairing of Nabarbi and Šuwaliyat was based on their shared connection with vegetation. However, Tašmišu had no connection to vegetation.

In the kaluti (offering lists) dedicated to the circle of deities associated with Ḫepat Nabarbi occurs after Šauška's servants Ninatta and Kulitta, and before Shuwala and the dyad Uršui-Iškalli. A connection between her and Shuwala, who was the tutelary goddess of Mardaman, is well attested. It has been proposed that it relied on the accidental similarity between the names of Shuwala and Šuwaliyat. However, it is also possible that it indicates both of these goddesses originated in the proximity of the river Khabur. Worship of pairs of goddesses (for example Išḫara and Allani, Hutena and Hutellura, Ninatta and Kulitta) as dyads was a common feature of Hurrian religion. In some cases, Nabarbi and Shuwala could be grouped with Ayu-Ikalti, the Hurrian form of the Mesopotamian goddess Aya, the bride of Shamash.

An association between Nabarbi and Šauška is also attested. In some itkalzi ("purification") rituals they appear alongside the pairs Hutena and Hutellura, Ea and Damkina, and Ḫepat and Mušuni. One of such texts refers to "water of Šauška and Nabarbi", believed to have purifying qualities.

== Worship ==
Alfonso Archi considers Nabarbi one of the "principal deities" of the Hurrian pantheon. Based on her placement in texts such as international treaties, it is assumed she was chiefly worshiped in the proximity of the river Khabur. Her cult center was Taite, a city located in this area. She appears as one of the divine witnesses in the treaty between Shattiwaza of Mitanni and Šuppiluliuma I of the Hittite Empire, in the proximity of figures such as Samanminuḫi, hypostases of Teshub associated with cities such as Washukanni and Irridu, Partaḫi of Šuda, Šuruḫḫi, Shala, Bēlat-ekalli, Damkina, Išḫara and others. It is presumed that the selection of deities in this text was politically motivated, with their cult centers being located roughly in the core of the Mitanni state.

=== Hittite reception ===
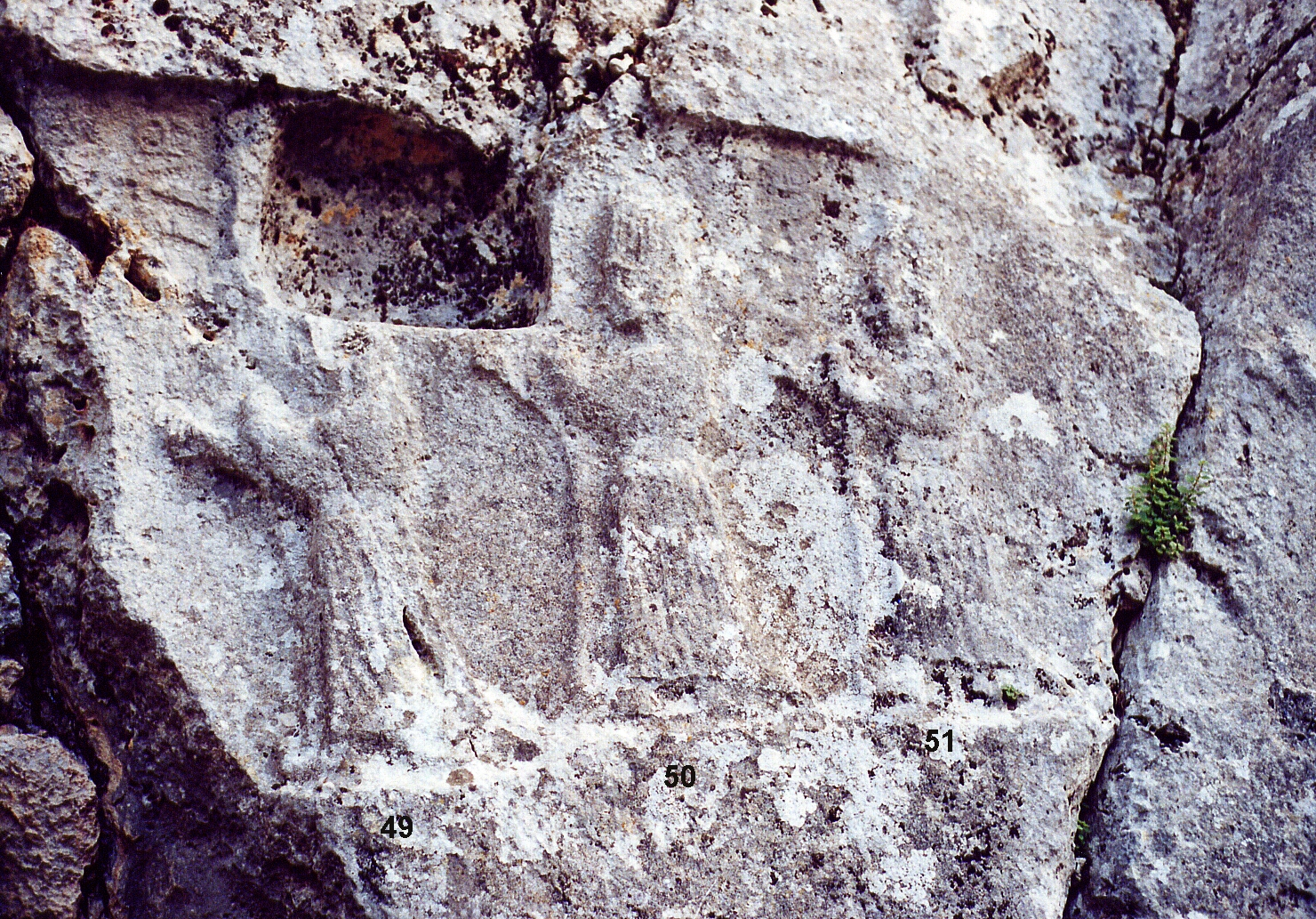
Reliefs depicting Allani, Išḫara and Nabarbi in Yazılıkaya.

From the Middle Hittite period onward Nabarbi was also worshiped by the Hittites in Hattusa, where she occurs among other Hurrian goddesses in offering lists dedicated to the entourages of Ḫepat and Šauška. She is one of the Hurrian deities depicted in the Yazılıkaya sanctuary, with the relief 51 which represents her placed after Allatu (Allani) and Išḫara and before Shalash. The identification is directly confirmed by an accompanying hieroglyphic Luwian inscription. The site is located close to Hattusa, and the pantheon depicted on its walls reflects Hurrian traditions from Kizzuwatna adopted by the Hittite royal family.

=== Emariote reception ===
Nabarbi is also attested in documents from Emar. It is assumed she was received from the Hurrian milieu, but the circumstances of the incorporation of her and other foreign deities, such as Mesopotamian Sebitti, into the local pantheon are poorly understood. (Note: It has been noted that there is no evidence that it was influenced by the Hurrianization of nearby Aleppo.) She occurs in a list of deities who received offerings during the local zukru festival as the 140th entry, after the weather god (^{d}IŠKUR) of Bašima’a and before Baliḫ, a pair of eponymous gods representing the Balikh River. John Thracy Thames classifies her as a member of what he deems the "third tier" of deities celebrated in this context, a designation he uses for the members of the local pantheon who received the least sacrificial animals (2 sheep per deity, in contrast with 5 sheep for "second tier" and 10 sheep and 5 calves for "first tier") and other offerings during it. However, it is unlikely that these ranks necessarily reflected the position of individual deities in Emariote religion outside of the context of the zukru. In contrast with figures such as Dagan, ^{d}NIN.KUR, Išḫara or Saggar Nabarbi only occurs once in the preserved texts pertaining to this festival. She is also absent from theophoric names, and there is no indication that a temple dedicated to her existed in the city.

=== Assyrian reception ===
Nabarbi continued to be worshiped in Taite in the Neo-Assyrian period. In a Tākultu ritual, she appears alongside two other originally Hurrian deities, Kumarbi and Samnuha. These texts were focused on invoking deities both from central cities of Assyria, such as Assur and Nineveh, and from its periphery to bless the king, with the oldest examples dating to the reign of Shamshi-Adad I; the version Nabarbi is attested in has been dated to the reign of Ashurbanipal.
