= Samnuha =

- Protector deity of Shadikanni
- Other names: Samanuha, Šamanminuḫi
- Major cult center: Shadikanni
- Ethnic group: Hurrians

Samnuha or Samanuha was the tutelary deity of Shadikanni (Šadikanni; modern Tell 'Ağağa) in the lower Habur area. It is generally accepted that he had Hurrian origin. It is assumed that Šamanminuḫi, a god known from a treaty of Shattiwaza, is the same deity. In this document, he occurs before "Teshub, lord of Washukanni," and after KASKAL.KUR.(RA).

Bel-Eresh, a ruler of Shadikanni who was a contemporary of Ashur-resh-ishi I, renovated the temple of Samanuha and a deity identified by Stephanie Dalley as Kubaba, the Hurrian goddess of Carchemish, but whose name was actually spelled ^{d}Gu-ba-ba.

Many attestations of Samanuha come from neo-Assyrian sources. He appears in an inscription of Ashurnasirpal II, where he is acknowledged as the personal god of the provincial governor Mushezib-Ninurta, the son of a ruler of Shadikanni who bore the theophoric name Samanuha-shar-ilani. He continued to be worshiped in Shadikanni at least until the ninth century BCE. He is also attested as one of the Hurrian deities from Taite (originally a major Mitanni city) in Tākultu, alongside Kumarbi and Nabarbi.

Personal names attest that Samanuha continued to be worshiped at least until the Achaemenid period.
