= Tall Al-Hamidiya =

Archaeological site in Syria

- Location within Syria
- 36°44′21″N 41°1′38″E
- Type: settlement
- Periods: Old Babylonian, Mitanni, Middle Assyrian, Neo-Assyrian
- Location: Al-Hasakah Governorate, Syria

History
- Built: 2nd millennium BC

Site notes
- Excavation dates: 1926, 1930, 1984-2011
- Archaeologists: Maurice Dunand, Antoine Poidebard, Agatha Christie, Max Mallowan, Markus Wäfler, Oskar Kaelin
- Condition: Ruined
- Owner: Public
- Public access: Yes

Tall Al-Hamidiya (also Tell Hamidiya, Tell Hamidiye, and Tell Hamidi) is an ancient Near Eastern archeological site the upper Hābūr region of modern-day Syria in the Al-Hasakah Governorate on a loop of the Jaghjagh River. It is located just to the north of the site of Tell Barri, just to the east of the ancient site of Tell Arbid, just to the west of Tell Farfara and 20 kilometers north of Tell Brak (thought to be ancient Nagar/Nawar). It has been suggested as the location of Ta'idu/Taite. If so, it was mentioned as Ta'idu in early 2nd millennium BC Ebla and Mari texts. Later it was a provincial capital of the Middle Bronze Age Mitanni Empire. This identification is based primarily on a few Middle Assyrian Neo-Assyrian sources, as Taite, and the proximity of Kahat (Tell Barri), known to have been nearby. Other locations have been proposed for Ta'idu/Taite.

== Archaeology ==
Map of the Khabur Basin during the Bronze Age showing the location of Tall Al-Hamidiya (in the middle) in relation to other important sites

The site was small during the early 2nd millennium BC based on archaeology and possibly textual sources from Ebla and Mari. In the Mitanni period it grew to a very large size at 245 hectares, surrounded by a wall and ditch. It consisted of a 17.6 hectare citadel high mound (including a monumental 3.8 hectare palace and a smaller 1.45 hectare palace) with a 17.5 hectare walled terrace (5.5 meters lower) adjacent to the south and also an extensive Lower Town (another 5 meters lower). The terrace wall has a width of 21 meters and the terrace, with three large buildings, is accessible from the Lower town at three ramps. The citadel has been severely disfigured by intrusive pits of later periods. This city was destroyed and a Middle Assyrian palace built on the remains of the old palace with otherwise minor occupation. If the site is indeed Ta'idu/Taite the destruction would be that reported by Adad-nirari I, early in the 13th century BC. There was also a modest level of occupation in the Neo-Assyrian and Hellenistic/Roman periods. Part of the site was damaged by the Syrian army attempting to build a missile site in 1998.

French archaeologists Maurice Dunand and Antoine Poidebard explored the site in 1926, noting Roman and Byzantine fortifications. The site was "trenched and successive levels from prehistoric times revealed". In the early 1930s the site was visited by Max Mallowan and Agatha Christie. Tall Al-Hamidiya was excavated between 1984 and 2011 by an Archaeological Institute of the University of Bern team led by Markus Wäfler and Oskar Kaelin, in all but five years. Among the finds were stela fragments with the names of Middle Assyrian rulers Shalmaneser I and Tukulti-Ninurta I. In 2010 a geophysical survey covering 41 hectares was completed. Excavation was interrupted after the 2011 season. A number of inscribed bricks, including those of Neo-Assyrian ruler Shalmaneser III (859–824 BC) were found.

Early in the excavations three cuneiform tablet fragments were found and published. They were of the period of Mitanni rulers but of uncertain context. In 2004 three tablets were found in the southwest palace, baked in the fire that destroyed it. There were not published but are described as ration lists. Cuneiform tablets, primarily economic in nature, in "Hurro-Akkadian" and dockets both dated to the Mitanni period were found in the southwest palace in 2007. They are held in the Deir ez-Zor Museum and have been unavailable for study but were hastily photographed first and later partially published. The find consisted of 17 unsealed and undated tablets and 94 dockets discovered discarded in the rubble of the palace. The tablets all dealt with beer rations and the dockets were sealed with typical Mitanni seals. These texts include rations for people "from Muṣri (Egypt), Alašiya (Cyprus), Ugarit, and Arrapḫa".

== History ==
The site was small but regionally significant in the Old Babylonian period, early in the 2nd millennium BC. With the rise of the Mitanni Empire the site grew much larger and became a provincial capital and later a royal residence. With the fall of the Mitanni, the site was briefly occupied under the Middle Assyrians and later under the Neo-Assyrians. A small amount of construction occurred in the Hellenistic and Roman period, mainly fortifications. There was also some small occupation at the high mound in the Parthian, Sasanian and Early Abbasid periods as well a 19th-century AD cemetery and some building of the French Mandate period.

== See also ==
- Cities of the ancient Near East
- Chronology of the ancient Near East
- Washukanni
