= Taidu =

Taidu can refer to:

- Taite, an ancient Middle Eastern city
- Taiwan independence, as the Mandarin Chinese pronunciation of the term
