= Apiocera alastor =

Scientific classification
- Kingdom: Animalia
- Phylum: Arthropoda
- Class: Insecta
- Order: Diptera
- Family: Apioceridae
- Genus: Apiocera
- Species: A. alastor

Binomial name
- Apiocera alastor (Walker, 1849)

Species of fly

Apiocera alastor is a species of fly in the family Apioceridae.

== Distribution ==
South Africa.
