= Cortodera stolida =

Scientific classification
- Kingdom: Animalia
- Phylum: Arthropoda
- Class: Insecta
- Order: Coleoptera
- Suborder: Polyphaga
- Infraorder: Cucujiformia
- Family: Cerambycidae
- Tribe: Rhagiini
- Genus: Cortodera
- Species: C. stolida

Binomial name
- Cortodera stolida (Casey, 1924)

Species of beetle

Cortodera stolida is a species of flower longhorn in the beetle family Cerambycidae. It is found in North America.
