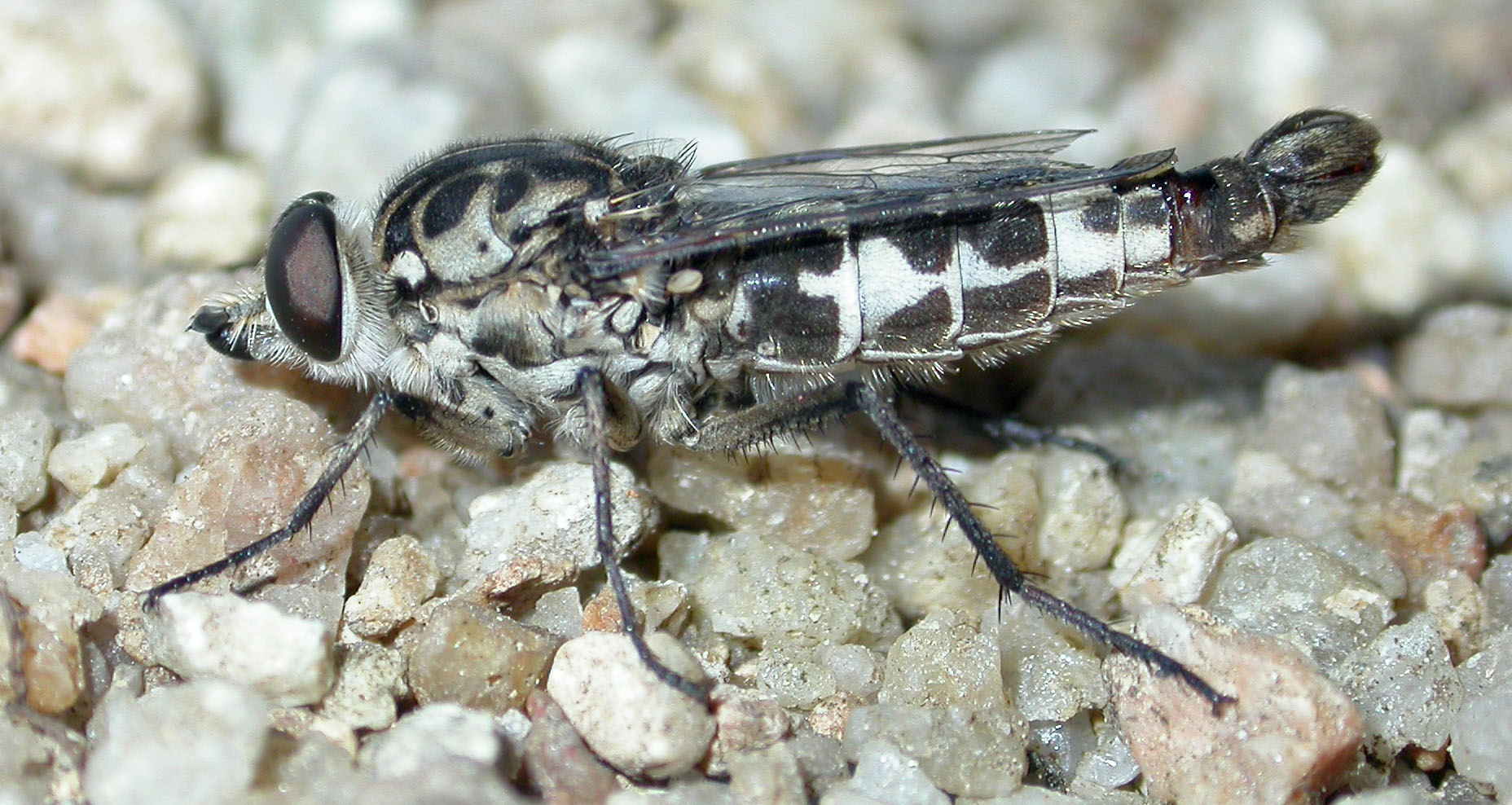

Scientific classification
- Kingdom: Animalia
- Phylum: Arthropoda
- Clade: Pancrustacea
- Class: Insecta
- Order: Diptera
- Infraorder: Asilomorpha
- Superfamily: Asiloidea
- Family: Apioceridae; Bigot, 1857
- Genus: Apiocera; Westwood, 1835

Subgenera
- Apiocera; Pyrocera; Ripidosyrma; Anypenus

= Apiocera =

Genus of flies

The Apioceridae, or flower-loving flies, are a small (about 150 species) family of flies, all in the single genus Apiocera. They occur mostly in dry, sandy habitats in the deserts of North America, South America, and Australia. Other genera formerly placed in Apioceridae are now in Mydidae.

== Diversity and biogeography ==
The roughly 150 species of Apiocera are divided into four subgenera, each restricted to a different continent. Apiocera is found in Australia, Ripidosyrma in southern Africa, Pyrocera in North America, and Anypenus in South America.

== Biology ==
Apiocera species are found in sandy, arid and semiarid habitats. Despite the common name, most Apiocera species never visit flowers, but rather are found running on the ground near sparse vegetation, or feeding on honeydew beneath aphid-infested plants. They are often seen drinking from damp sand with their sponge-like mouthparts. The larvae of Apiocera maritima are found in sand near the high-water mark of coastal beaches.

== Species ==
This section contains a list of 138 species:

- A. acuticauda Cazier, 1982
- A. acutipalpis Paramonov, 1953
- A. afacialis Paramonov, 1953
- A. alastor (Walker, 1849)
- A. albanyana Paramonov, 1953
- A. aldrichi Painter, 1936
- A. aliena Paramonov, 1953
- A. alleni Cazier, 1941
- A. ammophila Cazier, 1982
- A. angusta Paramonov, 1953
- A. antennata Paramonov, 1953
- A. arena Cazier, 1982
- A. arnaudi Cazier, 1982
- A. asilica Westwood, 1835
- A. asiloides Paramonov, 1953
- A. augur Osten Sacken, 1886
- A. aurelia Artigas, 1970
- A. auripilosa Cazier, 1982
- A. australis Paramonov, 1953
- A. badipeniculata Yeates, 1994
- A. barri Cazier, 1982
- A. basivillosa Paramonov, 1953
- A. beameri Painter, 1936
- A. bibula Cazier, 1982
- A. bigelowi Cazier, 1982
- A. bigotii (Macquart, 1847)
- A. bilineata Painter, 1932
- A. braunsi Melander, 1907
- A. brevicornis (Wiedemann, 1830)
- A. caboae Cazier, 1982
- A. calida Cazier, 1982
- A. caloris Painter, 1936
- A. campbelli Paramonov, 1953
- A. canuta Cazier, 1982
- A. cerata Paramonov, 1961
- A. chiltonae Cazier, 1982
- A. chrysolasia Cazier, 1982
- A. clavator Painter, 1936
- A. commoni Paramonov, 1953
- A. constricta Cazier, 1985
- A. contrasta Paramonov, 1953
- A. convergens Painter, 1936
- A. davidsonorum Cazier, 1982
- A. deforma Norris, 1936
- A. deserticola Paramonov, 1953
- A. draperae Cazier, 1982
- A. elegans Paramonov, 1953
- A. englishae Paramonov, 1953
- A. excepta Paramonov, 1953
- A. exta Cazier, 1941
- A. fallax Cazier, 1982
- A. fasciata Paramonov, 1953
- A. femoralis Cazier, 1982
- A. ferruginea Paramonov, 1953
- A. fisheri Cazier, 1982
- A. flabellata Paramonov, 1953
- A. foleyi Cazier, 1982
- A. franckei Cazier, 1982
- A. fullerae Paramonov, 1953
- A. goerlingi Paramonov, 1953
- A. hamata Cazier, 1982
- A. hardyi Paramonov, 1953
- A. haruspex Osten Sacken, 1877
- A. helenae Paramonov, 1953
- A. hispida Cazier, 1941
- A. horticolis Cazier, 1982
- A. immedia Hardy, 1940
- A. imminuta Hardy, 1940
- A. infinita Cazier, 1941
- A. interrupta Painter, 1936
- A. intonsa Cazier, 1941
- A. latifrons Paramonov, 1953
- A. latipennis Paramonov, 1953
- A. lavignei Cazier, 1985
- A. linsleyi Cazier, 1982
- A. longicauda Paramonov, 1961
- A. longitudinalis Paramonov, 1953
- A. lugubris Paramonov, 1953
- A. mackerrasi Paramonov, 1953
- A. macswaini Cazier, 1982
- A. maritima Hardy, 1933
- A. maxima Paramonov, 1953
- A. melanura Cazier, 1941
- A. mexicana Cazier, 1954
- A. minckleyi Cazier, 1982
- A. minor Norris, 1936
- A. moderata Paramonov, 1953
- A. moerens Westwood, 1841
- A. monticola Artigas, 1970
- A. mortensoni Cazier, 1982
- A. mulegeae Cazier, 1985
- A. newmani Norris, 1936
- A. nicholsoni Paramonov, 1953
- A. norrisi Hardy, 1940
- A. norrisiana Paramonov, 1953
- A. notata Painter, 1936
- A. oblonga Paramonov, 1953
- A. obscura (Philippi, 1865)
- A. ogradyi Cazier, 1982
- A. omniflava Paramonov, 1953
- A. ordana Paramonov, 1953
- A. orientalis Paramonov, 1953
- A. ornata Paramonov, 1953
- A. painteri Cazier, 1963
- A. pallida Norris, 1936
- A. parahydra Cazier, 1982
- A. parkeri Cazier, 1941
- A. pearcei Cazier, 1941
- A. philippii Brethes, 1924
- A. pica Norris, 1936
- A. picoides Paramonov, 1953
- A. pilosoris Paramonov, 1953
- A. powelli Cazier, 1982
- A. pruinosa Cazier, 1982
- A. pulcherrima Paramonov, 1961
- A. pulchra Paramonov, 1953
- A. reginae Paramonov, 1953
- A. rockefelleri Cazier, 1982
- A. rubrifasciata Cazier, 1982
- A. septentrionalis Paramonov, 1953
- A. similis Paramonov, 1953
- A. sonorae Cazier, 1954
- A. spectabilis Cazier, 1982
- A. striativentris Paramonov, 1953
- A. swani Paramonov, 1953
- A. sylvestris Cazier, 1982
- A. tonnoiri Norris, 1936
- A. trimaculata Painter, 1936
- A. tropica Paramonov, 1953
- A. unicolor Paramonov, 1953
- A. varia Cazier, 1985
- A. vespera Paramonov, 1953
- A. victoriae Paramonov, 1953
- A. volucra Cazier, 1982
- A. voragocolis Cazier, 1982
- A. vulpes Hermann, 1909
- A. warneri Cazier, 1985
- A. wilcoxi Cazier, 1982
