= Cortodera nitidipennis =

Scientific classification
- Kingdom: Animalia
- Phylum: Arthropoda
- Class: Insecta
- Order: Coleoptera
- Suborder: Polyphaga
- Infraorder: Cucujiformia
- Family: Cerambycidae
- Tribe: Rhagiini
- Genus: Cortodera
- Species: C. nitidipennis

Binomial name
- Cortodera nitidipennis (Casey, 1913)

Species of beetle

Cortodera nitidipennis is a species of flower longhorn in the beetle family Cerambycidae. It is found in North America.
