= Cortodera falsa =

Scientific classification
- Domain: Eukaryota
- Kingdom: Animalia
- Phylum: Arthropoda
- Class: Insecta
- Order: Coleoptera
- Suborder: Polyphaga
- Infraorder: Cucujiformia
- Family: Cerambycidae
- Genus: Cortodera
- Species: C. falsa

Binomial name
- Cortodera falsa (LeConte, 1860)

Species of beetle

Cortodera falsa is a species of flower longhorn in the beetle family Cerambycidae. It is found in Central America and North America.
