= Cortodera impunctata =

Scientific classification
- Domain: Eukaryota
- Kingdom: Animalia
- Phylum: Arthropoda
- Class: Insecta
- Order: Coleoptera
- Suborder: Polyphaga
- Infraorder: Cucujiformia
- Family: Cerambycidae
- Tribe: Rhagiini
- Genus: Cortodera
- Species: C. impunctata

Binomial name
- Cortodera impunctata Hopping & Hopping, 1947

Species of beetle

Cortodera impunctata is a species of flower longhorn in the beetle family Cerambycidae. It is found in North America.
