= Cortodera coniferae =

Scientific classification
- Domain: Eukaryota
- Kingdom: Animalia
- Phylum: Arthropoda
- Class: Insecta
- Order: Coleoptera
- Suborder: Polyphaga
- Infraorder: Cucujiformia
- Family: Cerambycidae
- Genus: Cortodera
- Species: C. coniferae

Binomial name
- Cortodera coniferae Hopping & Hopping, 1947

Species of beetle

Cortodera coniferae is a species of longhorn beetle in the genus Cortodera.
