= Cortodera subpilosa =

Western mountain flower longhorn

Scientific classification
- Domain: Eukaryota
- Kingdom: Animalia
- Phylum: Arthropoda
- Class: Insecta
- Order: Coleoptera
- Suborder: Polyphaga
- Infraorder: Cucujiformia
- Family: Cerambycidae
- Tribe: Rhagiini
- Genus: Cortodera
- Species: C. subpilosa

Binomial name
- Cortodera subpilosa (LeConte, 1850)

Synonyms
- Cortodera intermedia (Casey, 1913); Cortodera lupina (LeConte, 1860); Cortodera pugetana (Casey, 1913); Cortodera quadriceps (Casey, 1913)

Species of beetle

Cortodera subpilosa, the western mountain flower longhorn, is a species of flower long-horned beetle in the family Cerambycidae. It is found in the northwestern United States and southwestern Canada. Adults are dark brown to black, 7 to 13 mm in size, and are covered with fine hair.
