= Cortodera bivittata =

Scientific classification
- Domain: Eukaryota
- Kingdom: Animalia
- Phylum: Arthropoda
- Class: Insecta
- Order: Coleoptera
- Suborder: Polyphaga
- Infraorder: Cucujiformia
- Family: Cerambycidae
- Genus: Cortodera
- Species: C. bivittata

Binomial name
- Cortodera bivittata Linsley & Chemsak, 1972

Species of beetle

Cortodera bivittata is a species of longhorn beetle in the genus Cortodera.
