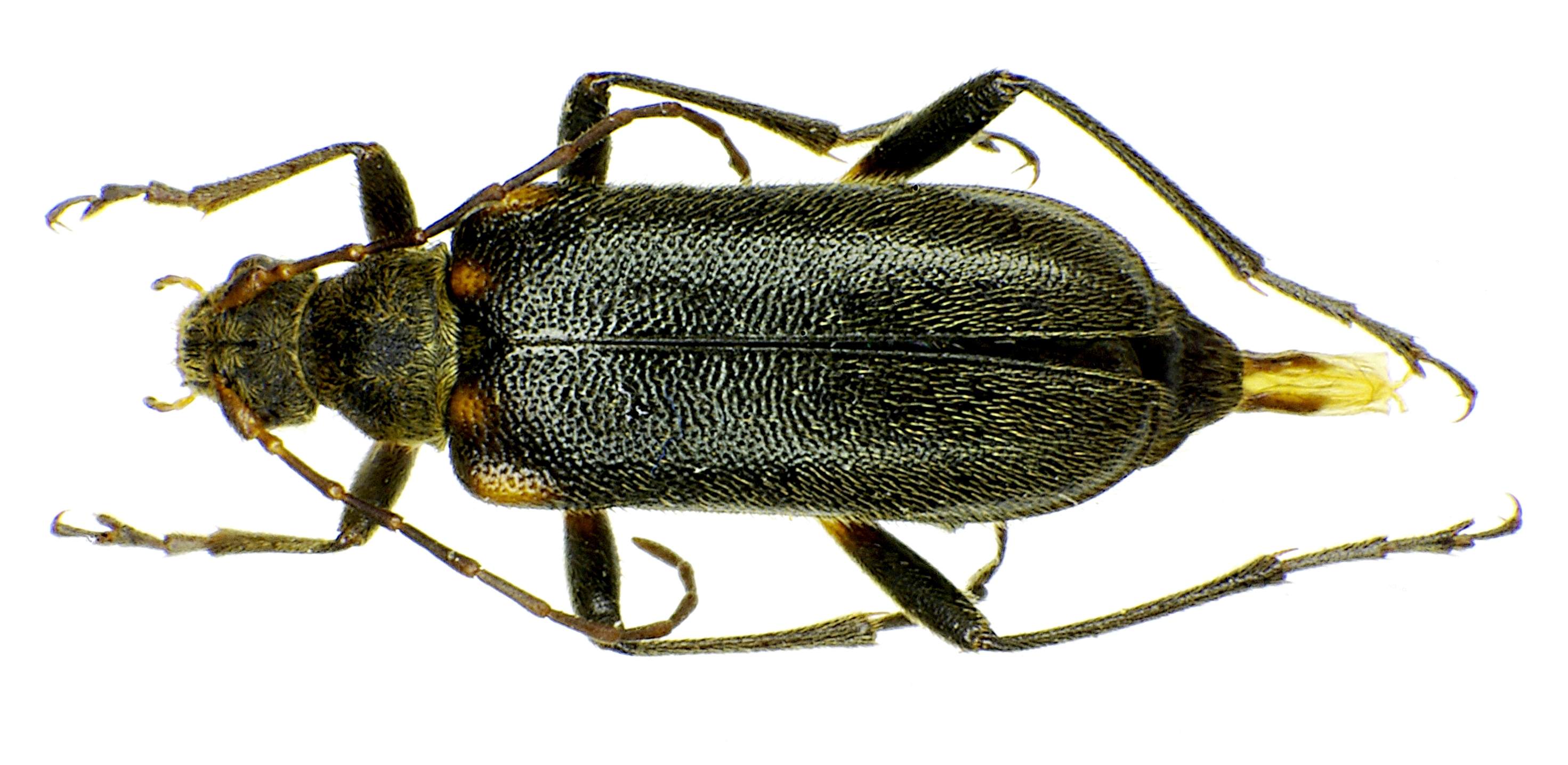
- Cortodera humeralis

Scientific classification
- Domain: Eukaryota
- Kingdom: Animalia
- Phylum: Arthropoda
- Class: Insecta
- Order: Coleoptera
- Suborder: Polyphaga
- Infraorder: Cucujiformia
- Family: Cerambycidae
- Subfamily: Lepturinae
- Tribe: Rhagiini
- Genus: Cortodera; Mulsant, 1863

= Cortodera =

Genus of beetles

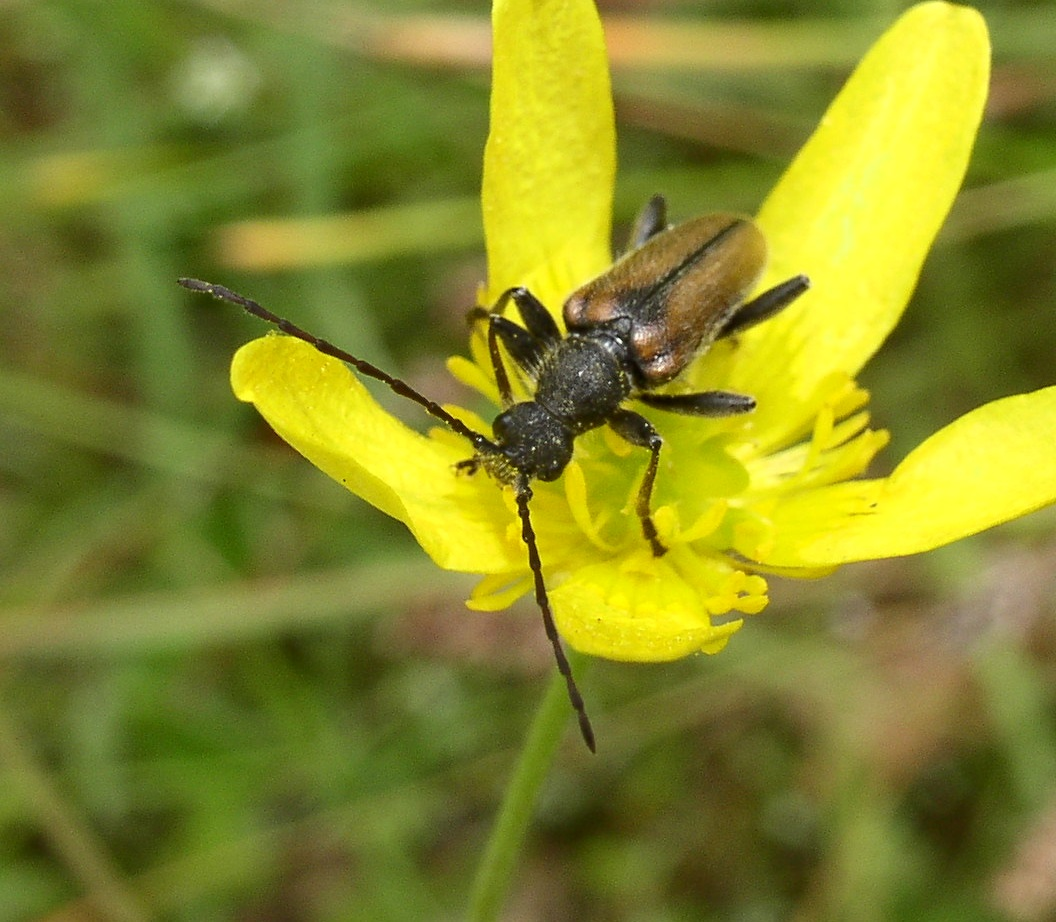
Cortodera sp.

Cortodera is a genus of beetles in the family Cerambycidae, containing the following species:

- Cortodera barri Linsley & Chemsak, 1972
- Cortodera bivittata Linsley & Chemsak, 1972
- Cortodera coniferae Hopping & Hopping, 1947
- Cortodera cubitalis (LeConte, 1861)
- Cortodera falsa (LeConte, 1860)
- Cortodera ferrea Linsley & Chemsak, 1972
- Cortodera fraudis Linsley & Chemsak, 1972
- Cortodera funerea Linsley & Chemsak, 1972
- Cortodera impunctata Hopping & Hopping, 1947
- Cortodera longicornis (Kirby in Richardson, 1837)
- Cortodera militaris (LeConte, 1850)
- Cortodera nitidipennis (Casey, 1913)
- Cortodera placerensis Hopping & Hopping, 1947
- Cortodera pseudomophlus (Reitter, 1889)
- Cortodera robusta Hopping & Hopping, 1947
- Cortodera spuria (LeConte, 1873)
- Cortodera stolida (Casey, 1924)
- Cortodera subpilosa (LeConte, 1850)
- Cortodera thorpi Linsley & Chemsak, 1972
- Cortodera tuberculicollis Linsley & Chemsak, 1972
- Cortodera vanduzeei Linsley & Chemsak, 1972
