= Cortodera pseudomophlus =

Scientific classification
- Kingdom: Animalia
- Phylum: Arthropoda
- Class: Insecta
- Order: Coleoptera
- Suborder: Polyphaga
- Infraorder: Cucujiformia
- Family: Cerambycidae
- Genus: Cortodera
- Species: C. pseudomophlus

Binomial name
- Cortodera pseudomophlus (Reitter, 1889)

Species of beetle

Cortodera pseudomophlus is a species of beetle in the Lepturinae subfamily, that can be found in Armenia, North Iran and Talysh.

== Description and habitat ==
The species is 11–15 millimetres (0.43–0.59 in) long. Males are black, while females are reddish-black. Adults are on wing in June.
