= Apiocera haruspex =

Scientific classification
- Domain: Eukaryota
- Kingdom: Animalia
- Phylum: Arthropoda
- Class: Insecta
- Order: Diptera
- Family: Apioceridae
- Genus: Apiocera
- Species: A. haruspex

Binomial name
- Apiocera haruspex Osten Sacken, 1877

Species of fly

Apiocera haruspex is a species of fly in the family Apioceridae.

== Subspecies ==
These three subspecies belong to the species Apiocera haruspex:

- Apiocera haruspex haruspex
- Apiocera haruspex martinorum
- Apiocera haruspex oncorhachis Cazier, 1982
