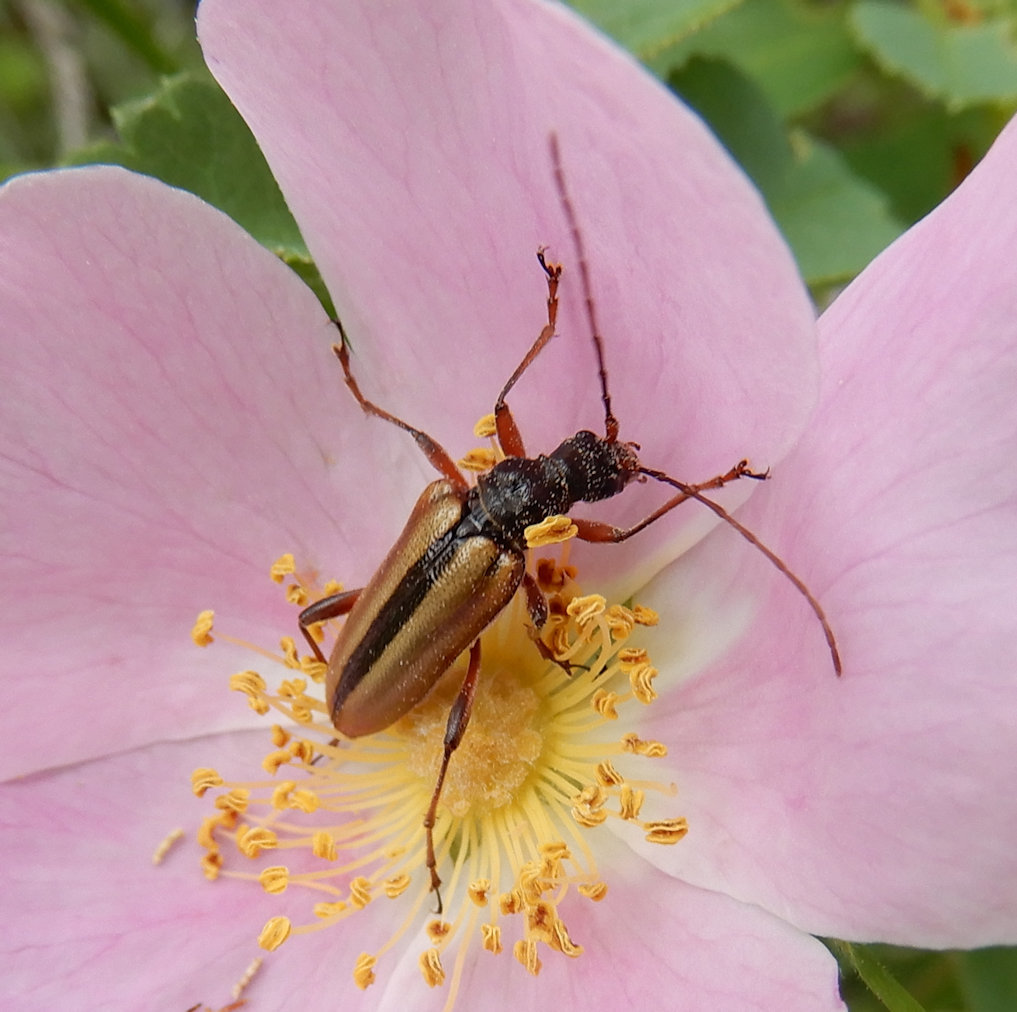
- Cortodera longicornis, Canada

Scientific classification
- Domain: Eukaryota
- Kingdom: Animalia
- Phylum: Arthropoda
- Class: Insecta
- Order: Coleoptera
- Suborder: Polyphaga
- Infraorder: Cucujiformia
- Family: Cerambycidae
- Tribe: Rhagiini
- Genus: Cortodera
- Species: C. longicornis

Binomial name
- Cortodera longicornis (Kirby in Richardson, 1837)

Synonyms
- Cortodera alticola (Casey, 1913); Cortodera bakeri Hopping and Hopping, 1947; Cortodera dorsalis (LeConte, 1859); Cortodera harneyensis Hopping and Hopping, 1947; Cortodera ligata (LeConte, 1873); Cortodera marginalis (LeConte, 1857); Cortodera oregonensis Hopping and Hopping, 1947; Cortodera punctiventris (Casey, 1913); Cortodera suturalis (Casey, 1924); Cortodera vincta (LeConte, 1861)

= Cortodera longicornis =

Species of beetle

Cortodera longicornis is a species of flower longhorn in the beetle family Cerambycidae. It is found in North America.
