= Cortodera cubitalis =

Scientific classification
- Domain: Eukaryota
- Kingdom: Animalia
- Phylum: Arthropoda
- Class: Insecta
- Order: Coleoptera
- Suborder: Polyphaga
- Infraorder: Cucujiformia
- Family: Cerambycidae
- Genus: Cortodera
- Species: C. cubitalis

Binomial name
- Cortodera cubitalis (LeConte, 1861)

Species of beetle

Cortodera cubitalis is a species of longhorn beetle in the genus Cortodera.
