= Cortodera militaris =

Scientific classification
- Domain: Eukaryota
- Kingdom: Animalia
- Phylum: Arthropoda
- Class: Insecta
- Order: Coleoptera
- Suborder: Polyphaga
- Infraorder: Cucujiformia
- Family: Cerambycidae
- Genus: Cortodera
- Species: C. militaris

Binomial name
- Cortodera militaris (LeConte, 1850)

Species of beetle

Cortodera militaris is a species of flower longhorn in the beetle family Cerambycidae. It is found in North America.

== Subspecies ==
These three subspecies belong to the species Cortodera militaris:

- Cortodera militaris constans Linsley & Chemsak, 1972
- Cortodera militaris militaris (LeConte, 1850)
- Cortodera militaris variipes (Casey, 1891)
