= Barri Gujar =

- village
- Location within Madhya Pradesh Location within India
- Coordinates: 23.5488816°N 77.3410569°E
- Country: India
- State: Madhya Pradesh
- District: Bhopal
- Tehsil: Berasia
- Elevation: 489 m (1,604 ft)

Population (2011)
  - Total: 603
- Time zone: UTC+5:30 (IST)
- ISO 3166 code: MP-IN
- 2011 census code: 482245

Barri Gujar is a village in the Bhopal district of Madhya Pradesh, India. It is located in the Berasia tehsil.

== Demographics ==
According to the 2011 census of India, Barri Gujar has 113 households. The effective literacy rate (i.e. the literacy rate of population excluding children aged 6 and below) is 50.98%.

Demographics (2011 Census)
	Total	Male	Female
Population	603	320	283
Children aged below 6 years	95	52	43
Scheduled caste	195	110	85
Scheduled tribe	0	0	0
Literates	259	165	94
Workers (all)	287	149	138
Main workers (total)	155	138	17
Main workers: Cultivators	67	62	5
Main workers: Agricultural labourers	85	73	12
Main workers: Household industry workers	0	0	0
Main workers: Other	3	3	0
Marginal workers (total)	132	11	121
Marginal workers: Cultivators	1	0	1
Marginal workers: Agricultural labourers	131	11	120
Marginal workers: Household industry workers	0	0	0
Marginal workers: Others	0	0	0
Non-workers	316	171	145
