= Barri al-Gharbi =

Barri al-Gharbi بري الغربي
- Village
- Location in Syria
- Coordinates: 34.989688°N 37.185545°E
- Country: Syria
- Governorate: Hama
- District: Salamiyah District
- Subdistrict: Barri Sharqi Subdistrict

Population (2004)
  - Total: 627
- Time zone: UTC+3 (AST)
- City Qrya Pcode: C3268

Barri al-Gharbi (Arabic: بري الغربي) is a Syrian village located in Barri Sharqi Subdistrict in Salamiyah District, Hama. According to the Syria Central Bureau of Statistics (CBS), Barri al-Gharbi had a population of 627 in the 2004 census.
