= Acmaeodera barri =

Scientific classification
- Kingdom: Animalia
- Phylum: Arthropoda
- Clade: Pancrustacea
- Class: Insecta
- Order: Coleoptera
- Suborder: Polyphaga
- Infraorder: Elateriformia
- Family: Buprestidae
- Genus: Acmaeodera
- Species: A. barri

Binomial name
- Acmaeodera barri Cazier, 1940

Species of beetle

Acmaeodera barri is a species of metallic wood-boring beetle in the family Buprestidae. It is found in Central America and North America.
