= Tell Barri =

Ancient settlement mound in northeastern Syria

- Kahat
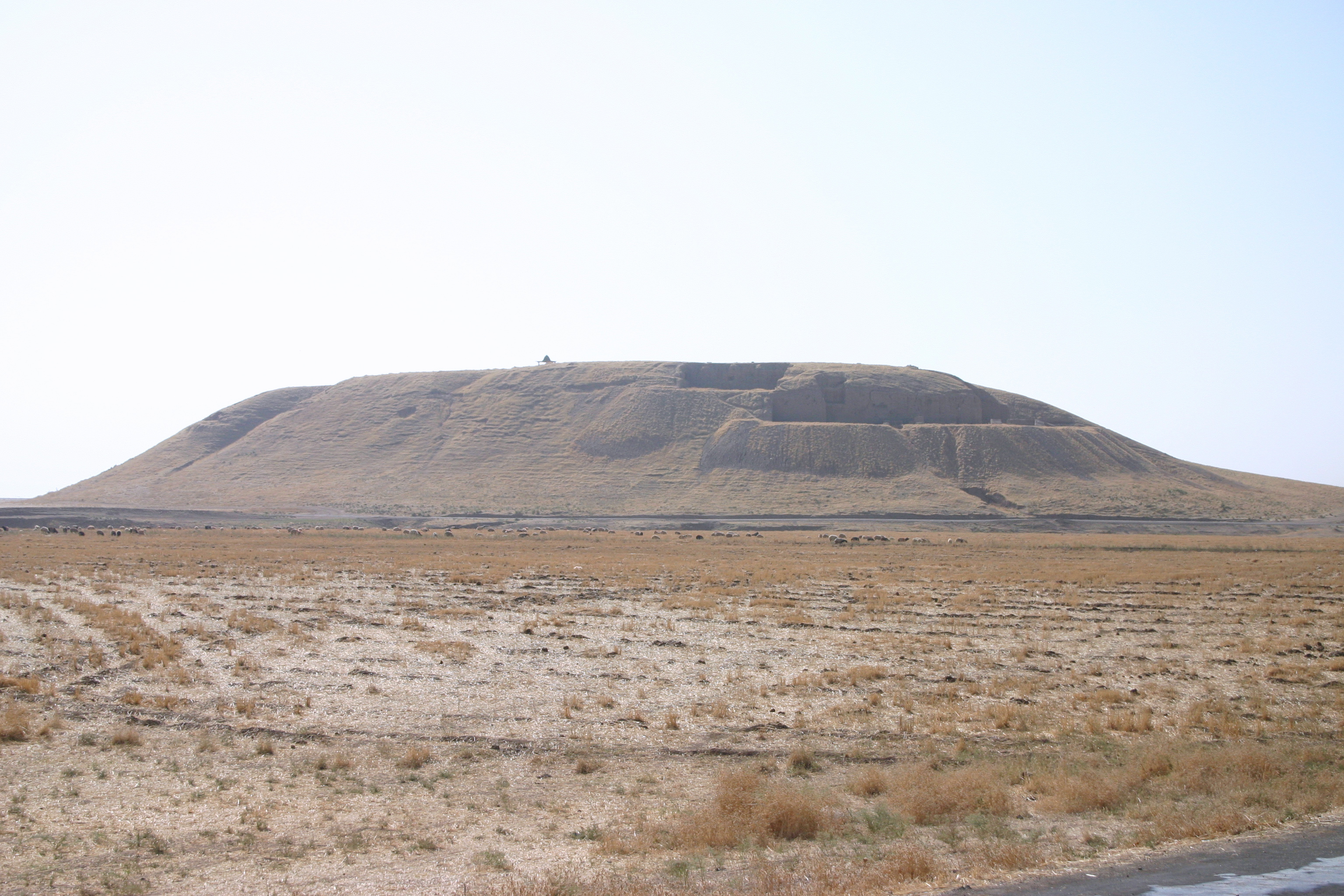
- A view of Tell Barri from the west

- Location within Syria
- 36°44′21″N 41°07′38″E
- Type: Settlement
- Location: Al-Hasakah Governorate, Syria
- Region: Mesopotamia

Site notes
- Height: 32 m (105 ft)
- Area: 37 ha (91 acres)
- Excavation dates: 1980-2010
- Archaeologists: Paolo Emilio Pecorella, Mirjo Salvini, Raffaella Pierobon-Benoit

Tell Barri (ancient Kahat) is a tell, or archaeological settlement mound, in north-eastern Syria, in the Al-Hasakah Governorate. It is on the Wadi Jaghjagh, a tributary of the Khabur River. It lies 22 kilometres (14 mi) from Tell Arbid and 8 kilometres (5 mi) north of the ancient city of Nagar (Tell Brak).

The site, situated in a semi-arid region, was inhabited for several millennia, with occupation spanning from the 4th millennium BC to modern times. Its ancient name was Kahat as proven by a threshold found on the south-western slope of the mound. The site contains remains of monumental structures, including the palace of Neo-Assyrian king Tukulti-Ninurta II (10th century BC), as well as domestic and industrial areas. In addition, various everyday objects, pottery, and inscriptions have been uncovered.

Archaeological research at Tell Barri began in 1980, led by a team of Italian archaeologists from the University of Florence under Paolo Emilio Pecorella and Mirjo Salvini. Excavations were later continued by the University of Naples Federico II from 2006 to 2010 under Raffaella Pierobon-Benoit.

== Geography ==
Map of the Khabur Basin during the Bronze Age showing the location of Tell Barri in relation to other important sites

Tell Barri is on the Jaghjagh River, a tributary of the Khabur River. It is about 8 kilometres (5 mi) north of Tell Brak (ancient Nagar) and approximately 40 kilometres (25 mi) from the Iraqi border. The tell rises to 32 metres (105 ft) in height and covers an area of 37 hectares (91 acres) at its base, with an additional 7 hectares (17 acres) forming a lower town.

== History ==
The earliest layers discovered at Tell Barri date to the Halaf period. Barri was in the Fertile Crescent and could benefit from winter rains as well as the river water. This developed the early agriculture of the area.

=== Early Bronze Age ===
The site of Tell Barri was inhabited since the 4th millennium BC. Ninevite 5 period pottery from the early 3rd millennium BC was found at the site. Tell Barri came under Akkadian cultural influence. The large urban centre at Tell Brak was nearby.

=== Middle Bronze Age ===
In the Middle Bronze IIA, the 18th century BC, the city now known as Kahat is attested from the palace archives of Mari. Kahat seems to have been ruled by semi-independent kings. The town then came under the rule of the Kingdom of Upper Mesopotamia, whose capital, Shubat-Enlil, was northeast of Kahat. A seal of a ruler of Kahat, Iamsi-Hadnu (contemporary of Tilabnu of Sehna) was found on a treaty at Tell Leilan. Another treaty found at Leilan was signed by Sūmum, a ruler of Kahat and Ḫaya-abum, the ruler of Šehna. When the empire collapsed, the harem of its king Shamshi-Adad I (r. 1809–1775 BC) sought refuge at Kahat.

Following the death of Shamshi-Adad I, Zimri-Lim of Mari (r. 1775–1761 BC) regained the throne of Mari and eventually conquered Kabiya of Kahat. One of the year names of Zimri-Lim was "Year in which Zimri-Lim seized Kahat". Mari retained control over this region until its fall to Hammurabi of Babylon (r. 1792–1750 BC).

=== Late Bronze Age ===
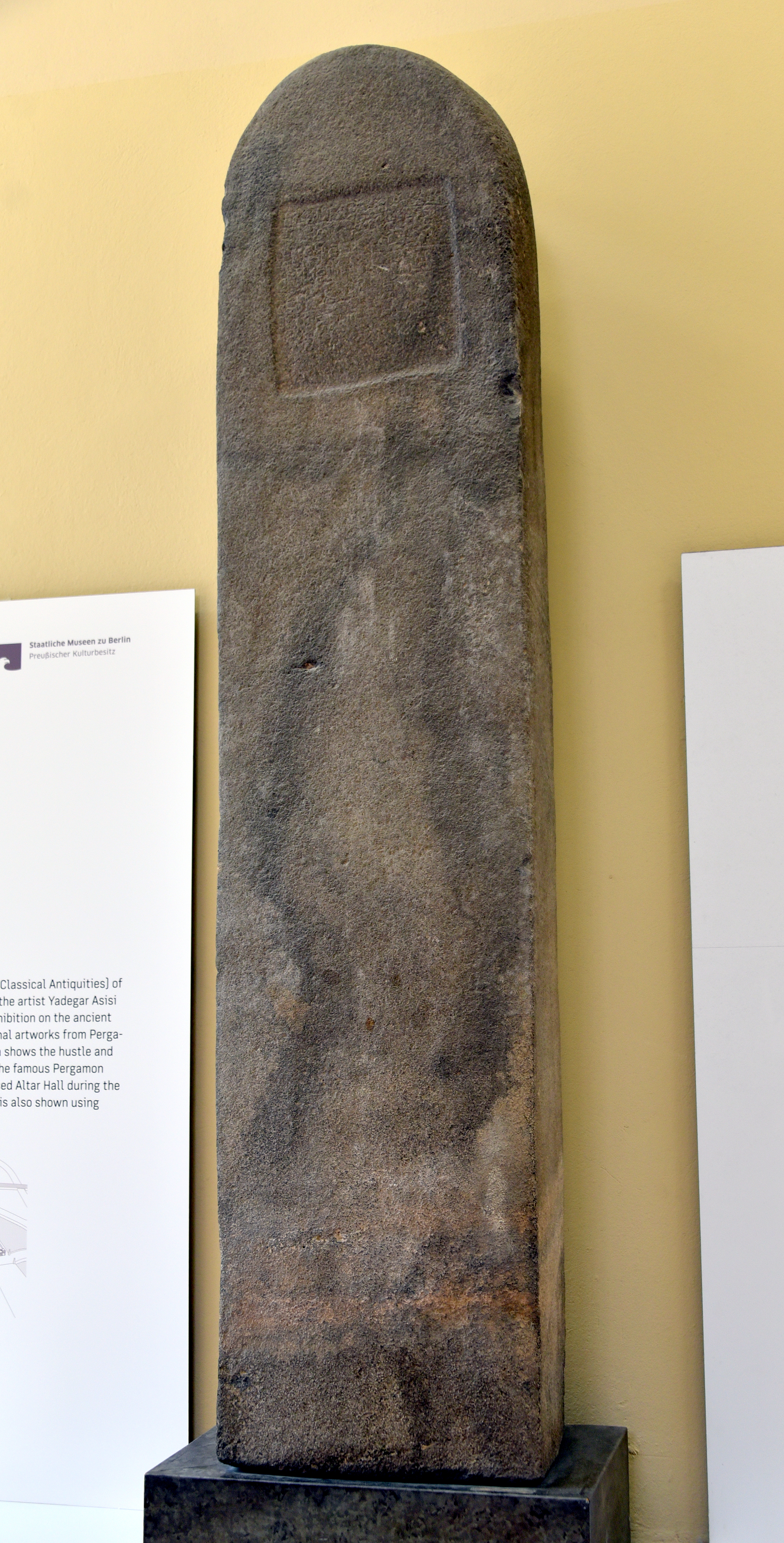
A stele of Shar-pati-beli, governor of Assur, Naṣibina, Urakka, Kahat, and Masaka. 831 BCE. From Assur, Iraq. Pergamon Museum

==== Mitannian Period ====
By the 15th century BC, the town had emerged as a religious centre when the Hurrian kingdom of Mitanni established itself in the region.

==== Hittite Period ====
The temple to the Storm god Teshub in Kahat is specifically mentioned in the Shattiwaza treaty of the 14th century BC. In 1345 BC, Suppiluliuma I of Hatti defeated the Mitanni stronghold of Carchemish, which led to the defeat of Tushratta of Mitanni. Tushratta was assassinated and the Mitanni Empire entered a civil war. Suppiluliuma entered a treaty with Shattiwaza (r. 1330–1305 BC), son of Tushratta, making the remnants of the Kingdom of Mitanni a vassal of the Hittites, and a buffer-state between Hatti in the west and Assyria in the east.

==== Middle Assyrian Period ====
Shortly afterwards the town fell into the hands of the Middle Assyrian Empire. A large palace was built dated to the time of Assyrian ruler Adad-Nirari I (c. 1305 to 1274 BC).

=== Iron Age ===
In the Neo-Assyrian Empire period a palace was built by the Assyrian king Tukulti-Ninurta II (891–884 BC) in Kahat.

The town lived on after the end of the Assyrian empire in the 7th century BC as a part of Achaemenid Assyria. Babylonians, Persians, Seleucids, Romans, Byzantine, and Parthians left their trace. The site was inhabited into the Arab period.

== Archaeology ==
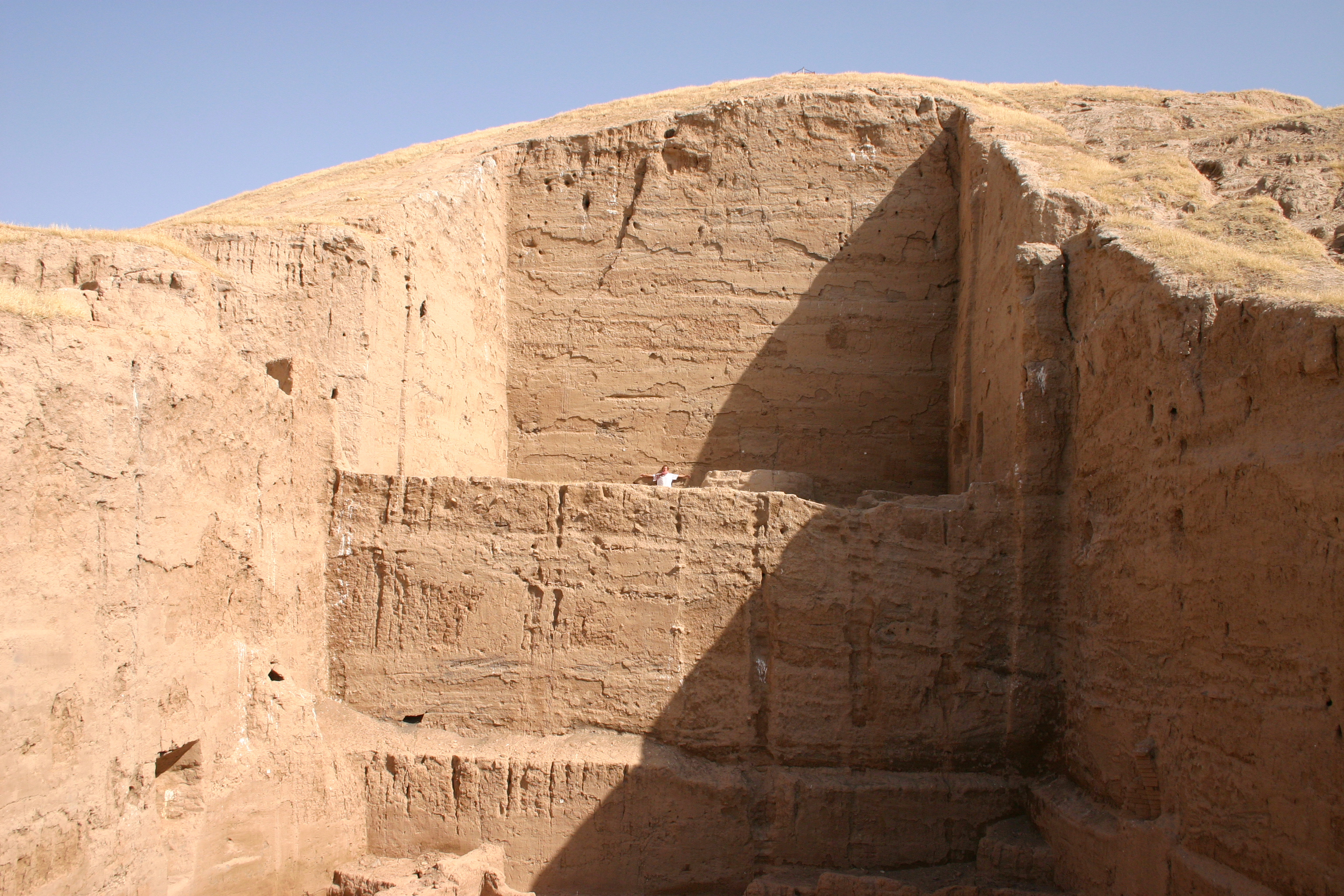
An excavation area at Tell Barri. Note the person standing in the middle for scale.

The height of the town mound is 32 metres (105 ft), and its base covers 37 hectares (91 acres). There is also a 7-hectare (17-acre) lower town.

In 1980 excavations were begun by a team of Italian archaeologists from the University of Florence, led by Paolo Emilio Pecorella and Mirjo Salvini. From 2006 until 2010, the dig was conducted by a team from University of Naples Federico II led by Raffaella Pierobon-Benoit.

The town was walled in the 2nd millennium BC, with an acropolis at its centre. Tombs were found at the site. Many ceramics were discovered, which have helped the archaeologists to determine the different strata of occupation of the mound. Artifacts from Tell Barri, including cuneiform tablets, have been taken to the museum of Aleppo.

Significant discoveries include a sacred complex in Area G (3rd millennium BC). Twenty graves from the Khabur period in the early 2nd millennium BC were excavated there. Also found were the remains of the royal palace of Neo-Assyrian ruler Tukulti-Ninurta II (Area J), and the Great Circuit Wall that surrounds the tell and dates to the Parthian period.

A large Parthian domestic complex dating from the 2nd to the 7th century AD was discovered in area H. Excavations have revealed a sequence of houses and working areas, including a large building (Building A) with multiple rooms and courtyards, dating to the late Parthian period. The evidence of destruction, especially in Stratum 11A, points to a natural catastrophe, possibly caused by structural failure or a severe storm. Room 396, identified as a service or storage area, yielded numerous potsherds, grindstones, and pieces of collapsed roof beams.

Scant traces of Roman occupation have been found in many areas of the site. Recently, Islamic occupation (houses' quarter) has been attested on the northern slope of the mound.

The site has suffered significant looting during the Syrian Civil War.

== See also ==
- Cities of the ancient Near East
- Short chronology timeline
- Tall Al-Hamidiya
