= Apiocera barri =

Scientific classification
- Domain: Eukaryota
- Kingdom: Animalia
- Phylum: Arthropoda
- Class: Insecta
- Order: Diptera
- Family: Apioceridae
- Genus: Apiocera
- Species: A. barri

Binomial name
- Apiocera barri Cazier, 1982

Species of fly

Apiocera barri is a species of fly in the family Apioceridae.
