= Waššukanni =

Capital of the Hurrian kingdom of Mitanni

A map of Mesopotamia showing Waššukanni, Nineveh, Hatra, Assur, Nuzi, Palmyra, Mari, Sippar, Babylon, Kish, Nippur, Isin, Lagash, Uruk, Charax Spasinu and Ur, from north to south.

Waššukanni (Hittite: 𒌷𒌑𒀸𒋗𒅗𒉌, romanized: ᵁᴿᵁWaššukani; and Hittite: 𒌷𒉿𒀸𒉻𒂵𒀭𒉌, romanized: ᵁᴿᵁWaššuganni) or Aššukanni (Middle Assyrian Akkadian: 𒌷𒀾𒋗𒅗𒀭𒉌) was the capital of the Hurrian kingdom of Mitanni, from around 1500 BC to the 13th century BC.

== Etymology ==
It has been suggested that the name Waššukanni is of Old Indo-Aryan origin, and its original form may have been *Vasukanni, composed of the Indic term vasu, meaning lit. 'good', to which was added the Indic suffix -ka-, followed by the Hurrian suffix -nni.

== Location ==
The precise location of Waššukanni is unknown with most suggestions being in the general area defined by the Khabur River, a tributary of the Euphrates River, and the Jaghjagh River in the upper Jezirah of Syria. A proposal by Dietrich Opitz located it under the largely unexcavated mound of Tell el Fakhariya, near Tell Halaf in Syria. This position was supported by M. Oppenheim and more recently by others. A neutron activation comparison with clay from relevant Amarna tablets appeared to rule out Tell Fakhariya. This idea was also rejected by Edward Lipinski. However, this identification received a new support by Stefano de Martino, Mirko Novák and Dominik Bonatz due to recent archaeological excavations by a German team. But despite many seasons of excavations, no documentation of the name of the Mittani capital has yet been found.

On his way to conquer Waššukanni, Suppiluliuma I passed through Isuwa (east of Malatya, within the bend of the Euphrates), Alse (upper Tigris valley), Kutmar (on the Batman-Su ?) and Suta (on the lower Batman-Su ?) and then returns to the Euphrates and Halpa then "Piyasilis and Mattiwaza pass "Irrite and Harran" then wait in Irrite (Irridu) before coming to Waššukanni. This would suggest a location near Mardin.

In the original text:

"I the Sun Suppiluliumas, the great king, the king of the Hatti land, the valiant, the favorite of the Storm-god, reached the country of Alse and captured the provincial center Kutmar To Antar-atal of the country of Alse I presented it as a gift. I proceeded to the provincial center Suta and ransacked it. I reached Wassukanni. The inhabitants of the provincial center Suta together with their cattle, sheep (and) horses, together with their possessions and together with their deportees I brought to the Hatti land. Tusratta, the king, had departed, he did not come to meet me in battle. I turned around and (re) crossed the Euphrates. I vanquished the country of Halba and the country of Mukis."

Tell Farfara and Üçtepe Höyük (near Üçtepe, Bismil in Diyarbakır Province in Turkey) have also been proposed.

The large and relatively recently found, site of Koçlu Tepe has also been proposed.

The site of Tell al-Hawa in the Jazira has also been suggested.

== History ==
Waššukanni is known to have been sacked by the Hittites under Suppiluliuma I (reigned c. 1344–1322 BC) in the first years of his reign, whose treaty inscription relates that he installed a Hurrian vassal king, Shattiwaza. The city was sacked again by the Assyrian king Adad-nirari I around 1290 BC, and became an Assyrian provincial capital for a time before disappearing from history.

=== Legacy ===
The modern-day Waşokanî refugee camp, built near Hesekê in the Autonomous Administration of North and East Syria to house inhabitants of Serê Kaniyê and Zirgan who had been displaced by the 2019 Turkish offensive into north-eastern Syria, is named after Waššukanni.

== See also ==
- Mitanni
- Cities of the ancient Near East
- Indo-Aryan superstrate in Mitanni
- Taite
- Tall Al-Hamidiya

== Sources ==
- Dominik Bonatz, "Waššukanni at the End of the Late Bronze Age: The Fate of a Capital City During Periods of Change", in Exploring 'Dark Ages' Archaeological Markers of Transition in the Near East from the Bronze Age to the Early Islamic Period, Benoit et al. (ed), Harrassowitz Verlag, Wiesbaden, pp. 33–52, 2022
- Kryszeń, A. (2023). "Waššukanni". Hittite Toponyms. University of Mainz; University of Würzburg.
- W Mayer, "Taide Oder Wassukanni? Name und Lage der Hauptstadt Mitannis", in Ugarit-Forschungen. Internationales Jahrbuch für die Altertumskunde Syrien-Palästinas, vol. 18, pp. 231–236, 1986
- A. Moortgat, "Arch. Forschungen der Max Freiherr von Oppenheim-Stiftung im nordlichen Mesopotamien", Arbeitsgemeinschaft fur Forschung des Landes Nordrhein-Westfalen 62, 1957
- von Dassow, Eva (2022). "Mittani and Its Empire". In Karen Radner; Nadine Moeller; D. T. Potts (eds.). The Oxford History of the Ancient Near East. Vol. III: From the Hyksos to the Late Second Millennium BC. New York: Oxford Academic. pp. 455–528. doi:10.1093/oso/9780190687601.003.0029.
