= Barri settlement =

Settlement in Gombe State

Barri
- Settlement
- Location in Nigeria
- Coordinates: 9°51′34″N 11°00′14″E
- Country: Nigeria
- State: Gombe State
- LGA: Akko

Government
  - Type: Democratic

Area
  - Total: 1,207 km^{2} (466 sq mi)

Population (2006 census)
  - Ethnicities: Fulani Tangale
  - Religions: mostly populated are Muslims and some few Christians
- Time zone: UTC+1 (WAT)

Barri is a settlement located in Akko Local Government Area, Gombe State, Nigeria. There are about 51 miles/32 km between Barri and Gombe's capital. Nigeria's capital, Abuja, is approximately 395 kilometeres/246 miles distant from Barri.

The area's postcode is 771104.

== Climate ==
Barri experiences a tropical climate that is classified as savanna or wet and dry. The annual temperature of the area is 32.23 °C, which is 2.77% higher than the average for Nigeria. Every year, Barri experiences 101.58 rainy days and receives approximately 70.54 millimetres or 2.7 inches of precipitation.
