= Jaghjagh River =

Tributary of the Khabur River in Turkey and Syria

Coordinates: 36°29′51″N 40°46′16″E

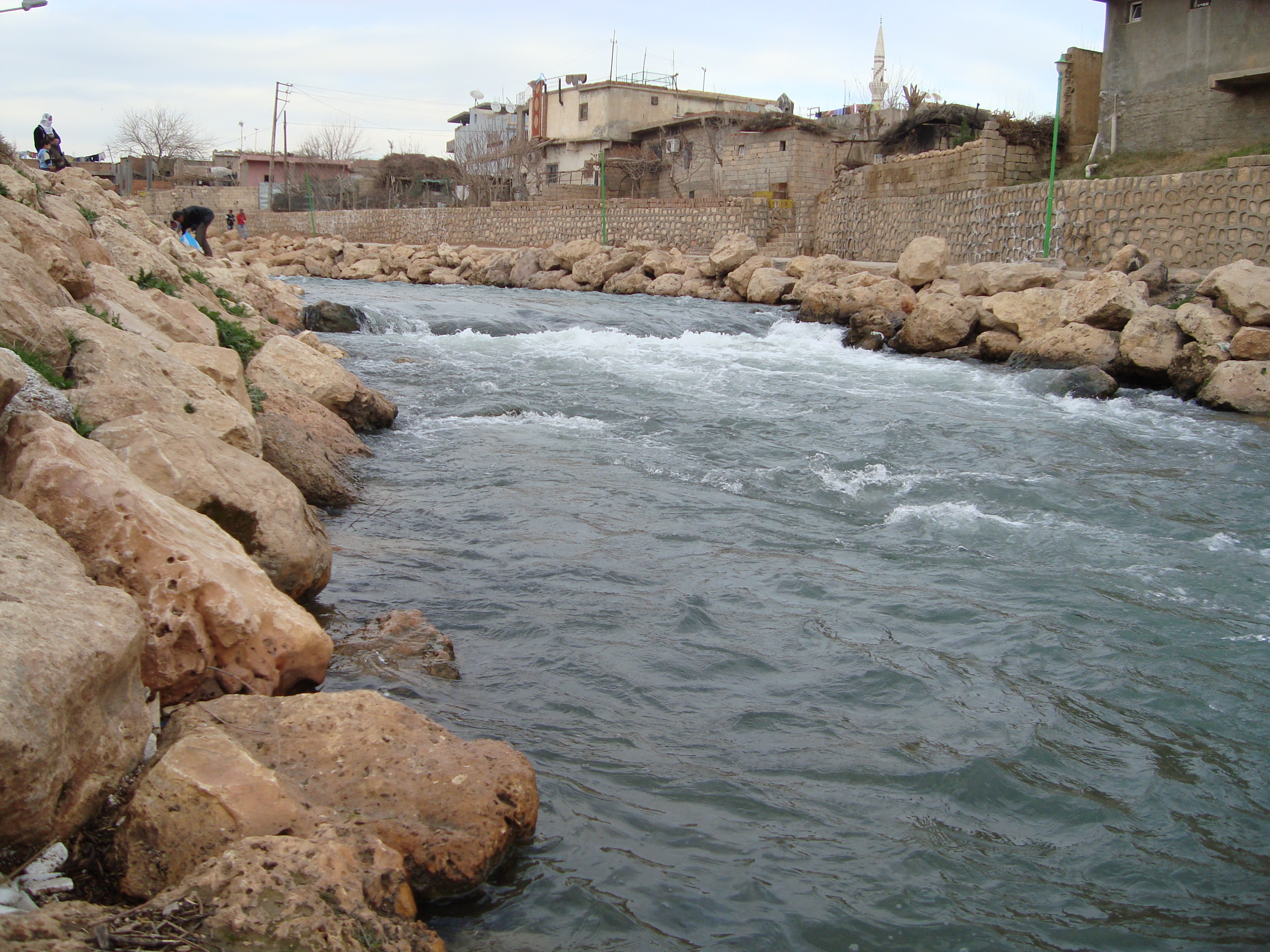
The Jaghjagh at Nusaybin.

The Jaghjagh River (Arabic: نهر جقجق Nahr Jaqjaq, نهر الجغجغ Nahr al-Jaghjagh, or Nahr al-Hirmas, Turkish: Çağ-çağ Deresi, Syriac: ܢܗܕܐ ܕܔܩܔܩ Nahro dJaqjaq, Kurdish: Çemê Nisêbînê or Cexcex) is a tributary of the Khabur River in Turkey and Syria.

The river was known to the ancient Greeks as the Mygdonius (Ancient Greek: Μυγδόνιος), and lent its name to the city of Antioch in Mygdonia.

== Sources ==
The river has two sources. The longer branch, known as Siyahsu (meaning dark water, Kurdish Av-e Resh), rises near the village of Toptepe in Mardin Province, Turkey, and flows 10 km to the confluence with the shorter branch, known as Beyazsu (meaning white water, Kurdish Av-e Spi).

== Course ==
The river crosses into Syria near the cities of Nusaybin and Qamishli. The water is heavily used for irrigation, in both Turkey and Syria. The river flows into the Khabur River at Al-Hasakah.

== Wildlife ==
Freshwater mussels and turtles live in the river. Trout are also raised commercially. Oil spills into the river caused by the repeated Turkish attacks on oil facilities nearby caused pollution of its watercourse.
