= Taite =

Taite (called Ta'idu in Assyrian sources) was one of the capitals of the Mitanni Empire. Its exact location is still unknown, although it is speculated to be in the Khabur region. The site of Tall Al-Hamidiya has recently been proposed as the location of ancient Taite. Tell Farfara and the Anatolian site of Üçtepe Höyük has also been suggested, among others. It has also been proposed that there two settlements name Ta'idu in the region.

During the Fall of the Mitanni Empire, the conquering Assyrian ruler Adad-Nirari (1307–1275 BC or 1295–1263 BC) slaughtered the inhabitants. He sowed the grounds with salt. He later reports restoring the capital city Taidu.

== See also ==
- Cities of the ancient Near East
