= Snakes in mythology =

Serpent that only appears in myths and legends

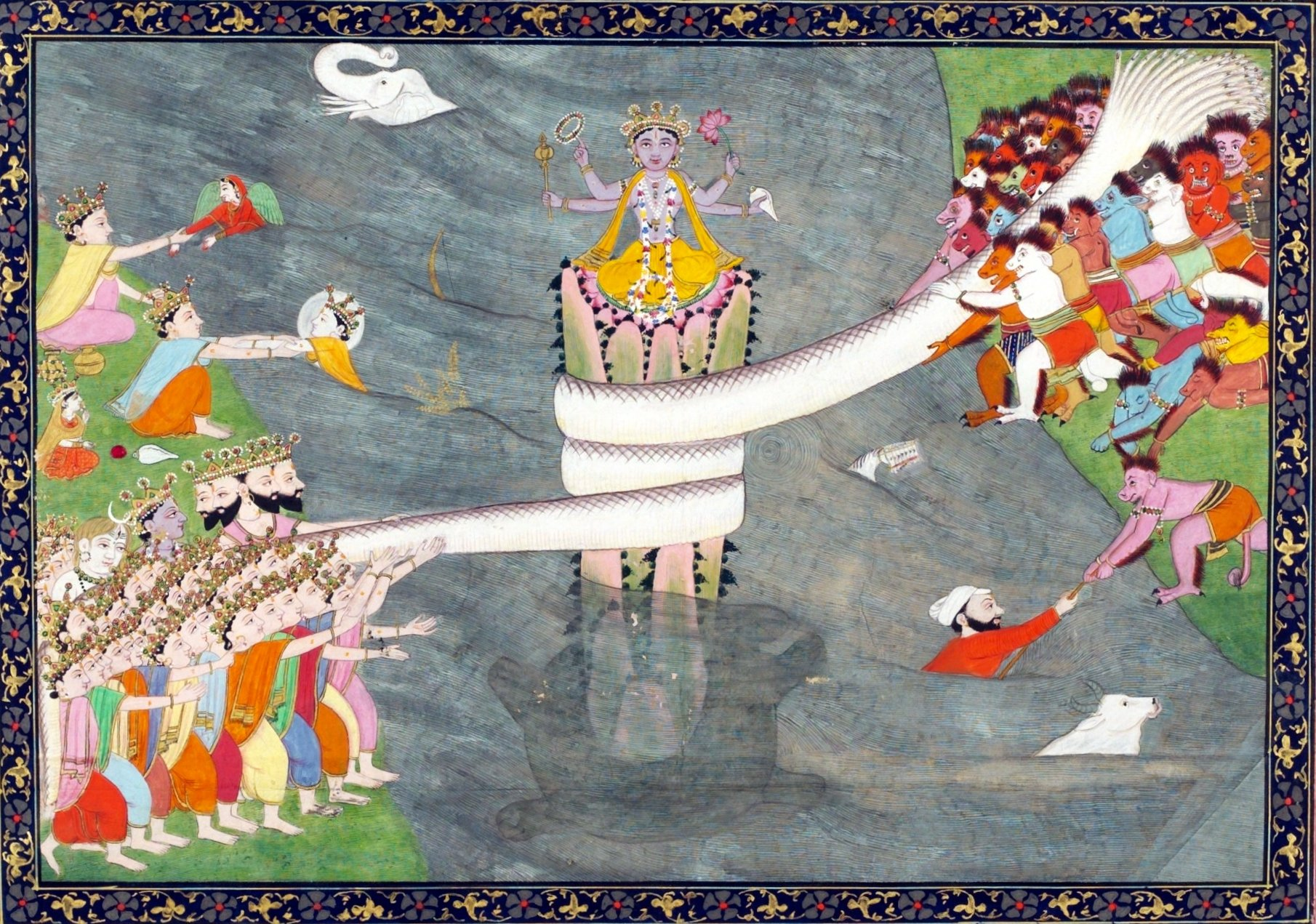
The Hindu serpent king Vasuki appears in the Indian Puranas creation myth Samudra Manthana (churning of the ocean of milk)

Snakes are a common occurrence in myths for a multitude of cultures, often associated with themes of wisdom, healing, creation, immortality, water, or the underworld.

== Immortality ==
The West African kingdom of Dahomey regarded snakes as immortal because they appeared to be reincarnated from themselves when they sloughed their skins. Snakes were often also associated with immortality because they were observed biting their tails to form a circle and when they coiled they formed spirals. Both circles and spirals were seen as symbols of eternity. This symbol has come to be known as the Ouroboros. The circle was particularly important to Dahomeyan myth where the snake-god Danh circled the world like a belt, corseting it and preventing it from flying apart in splinters. In Egyptian myth, the state of existence before creation was symbolized as Amduat; a many-coiled serpent from which Ra the Sun and all of creation arose, returning each night and being reborn every morning. Also, in Norse mythology, the snake biting its tail (Ouroboros) symbolized the sea as the eternal ring which enclosed the world. In Egypt the snake has healing abilities. Hymns and offerings were made to it since it was believed that the Goddess could manifest through the snake. "In a hymn to the goddess Mertseger, a workman on the Necropolis of Thebes relates how the goddess came to him in the form of a snake to heal his illness (Bunn1967:617)."

In Serer cosmogony and religion, the serpent is the symbol of the pangool, the saints and ancestral spirits of the Serer people of West Africa. When a person dies, the Serer believe that their soul must make its way to Jaaniiw (a place where good souls go). Before the soul can reach Jaaniiw in order to reincarnate (ciiɗ in Serer), it must transform into a black snake. During this transformation, the snake hides in a tree. For this reason, it is taboo in Serer culture to kill snakes. A great degree of respect is afforded to snakes in Serer culture, as they are the very embodiment and symbol of their saints and ancestral spirits. Like their Serer counterparts, the Dogon people of Mali also have great reverence for the serpent. The serpent plays an active role in Dogon religion and cosmogony. The mythology of the Dogon's primordial ancestor Lebe, it based almost entirely on a serpent mythology. In their traditional African religious belief, they say that the Serpent Lebe guided the Dogon people from Mandé to the Bandiagara Escarpment (their current home) when they decided to migrate to flee Islamization and persecution. The Dogon believe that Lebe is the very reincarnation of the Dogon's first ancestor—who was resurrected in the form of a snake.

In the Sumerian culture snakes were also very important as a healing symbol. In Hammurabi’s Law Code (c. 1700 BC) the god Ninazu is identified as the patron of healing, and his son, Ningishzida, is depicted with a serpent and staff symbol (Bunn 1967:618)

== Creation myths ==
Besides the very wide known religious creation story of Adam and Eve, snakes were a common feature of many creation myths, for example many people in California and Australia had myths about the Rainbow Snake, which was either Mother Earth herself giving birth to all animals or a water-god whose writhing created rivers, creeks and oceans. In ancient Indian myth, the drought-serpent Ahi or Vritra swallowed the primordial ocean and did not release all created beings until Indra split the serpent's stomach with a thunderbolt. In another myth, the protector Vishnu slept on the coils of the world-serpent Shesha (or "Ananta the endless";). Shesha in turn was supported on Kurma and when Kurma moved, Shesha stirred and yawned and the gaping of its jaws caused earthquakes.

In Chinese mythology, the woman-headed snake Nüwa made the first humans. She made humans one at a time with clay.

Delighted, she made another figure, and another and another, and each came to life in the same way. Day in and day out Nǚwā amused herself making mud figures and watching them come to life.

To conserve her energy, she dipped a rope in clay and flicked it so blobs of clay landed everywhere; each blob of clay became an individual human. The first humans of hers became high-class, but second ones became low-class.

Greek cosmological myths tell of how the snake Ophion incubated the primordial egg from which all things were born.

The classical symbol of the Ouroboros depicts a snake in the act of eating its own tail. This symbol has many interpretations, one of which is the snake representing cyclical nature of life and death, life feeding on itself in the act of creation.

== The underworld ==
Snakes were regularly regarded as guardians of the Underworld or messengers between the Upper and Lower worlds, because they lived in cracks and holes in the ground. In Greek mythology, the Gorgons – including Medusa – were women whose heads were lined with snakes, their gaze capable of turning people to stone. Nagas, "the demon cobra" and naginis were human-headed snakes whose kings and queens lived in jewel-encrusted underground or underwater paradises and who were perpetually at war with Garuda the Sun-bird. In Egyptian myth, every morning the serpent Aapep (symbolising chaos) attacked the Sunship (symbolizing order). Aapep would try to engulf the ship and the sky was drenched red at dawn and dusk with its blood as the Sun defeated it.

In Nordic myth, evil was symbolized by the serpent (actually a dragon) Nidhogg (the 'Dread Biter') who coiled around one of the three roots of Yggdrasil the Tree of Life, and tried to choke or gnaw the life from it. "Here there is an evil dragon named Nidhogg that gnaws constantly at the root, striving to destroy Yggdrasil" In ancient Slavic paganism a deity by the name of Veles presided over the underworld. He is almost always portrayed as a serpent or dragon depending on the particular myth. The underworld was part of a mythical world tree. The roots of this tree (usually growing in water) were guarded by Veles (Volos) the serpent god.

The idea of snake-people living below the Earth was prominent in American myth. The Aztec underworld, Mictlan was protected by python-trees, a gigantic alligator and a snake, all of which spirits had to evade by physical ducking and weaving or cunning, before they could start the journey towards immortality. In North America, the Brule Sioux people told of three brothers transformed into rattlesnakes which permanently helped and guided their human relatives.

The Pomo people told of a woman who married a rattlesnake-prince and gave birth to four snake-children who freely moved between the two worlds of their parents. The Hopi people told of a young man who ventured into the underworld and married a snake-princess.

Snakes have been associated with Hecate, the Greek goddess of magic and the lower world.

== Water ==
Snakes were also commonly associated with water especially myths about the primordial ocean being formed of a huge coiled snake as in Ahi/Vritra in early Indian myth and Jormungand in Nordic myth. Sea monsters lived in every ocean from the seven-headed crocodile-serpent Leviathan of Hebrew myth to the sea-god Koloowisi of the Zuni people of North America and the Greek monster Scylla with six snake-necks. In some cultures, eels (which spend their early lives in freshwater before returning to the sea as adults) were regarded as magical creatures.

Rivers and lakes often had snake-gods or snake-guardians including Untekhi the fearsome water-spirit of the Missouri River. Until recently, some northern European communities held well dressing ceremonies to appease the snake-spirits which lived in village wells and told legends of saints defeating malevolent lake-snakes e.g. Saint George killing a maiden-devouring serpent or Saint Columba lecturing the Loch Ness Monster which then stopped eating humans and became shy of human visitors.

Carved stones depicting a seven-headed cobra are commonly found near the sluices of the ancient irrigation tanks in Sri Lanka; these are believed to have been placed as guardians of the water.

== Wisdom ==
Snakes were associated with wisdom in many mythologies, perhaps due to the appearance of pondering their actions as they prepare to strike, which was copied by medicine men in the build-up to prophecy in parts of West Africa. Usually the wisdom of snakes was regarded as ancient and beneficial towards humans but sometimes it could be directed against humans. In East Asia snake-dragons watched over good harvests, rain, fertility and the cycle of the seasons, whilst in ancient Greece and India, snakes were considered to be lucky and snake-amulets were used as talismans against evil.

The Biblical story of the fall of man (also found in the Islamic Qu'ran) tells of how Adam and Eve were deceived into disobeying God by a snake (identified as Satan by both Paul and John in II Corinthians and Revelation, respectively). In the story, the snake convinces Eve to eat fruit from the Tree of Knowledge of Good and Evil, which she then convinces Adam to do as well. As a result, God banishes Adam and Eve from the garden and curses the snake.

In the state of Kerala, India, snake shrines occupy most households. Snakes were called upon by the creator of Kerala, Parasurama, to make the saline land fertile. The Mannarasala Shri Nagaraja Temple is one of the main centers of worship. The presiding deity here is Nagaraja - a five-headed snake god born to human parents as a blessing for their caretaking of snakes during a fire. It is believed that Nagaraja left his earthly life and took Samadhi but still resides in a chamber of the temple.

Hebrew scripture discusses the wisdom of the snake, Jesus encourages his disciples, telling them "I am sending you out like sheep into the midst of wolves; so be as wise as serpents..." (Matt 10:16). In these scriptures, snakes are characterized as cunning and noxious but wise nonetheless.

== Healing ==
Healing and snakes were associated in ancient Greek myth with Asclepius, whose snake-familiars would crawl across the bodies of sick people asleep at night in his shrines and lick them back to health.

In northern Europe and West Asia, snakes were associated with healing whilst in parts of South Asia, snakes are regarded as possessing aphrodisiac qualities. Greek myth held that people could acquire second hearing and second sight if their ears or eyes were licked by a snake.

The Hopi people of North America viewed snakes as symbols of healing, transformation, and fertility. Snakes in Mexican folk culture tell about the fear of the snake to the pregnant women where the snake attacks the umbilical cord.

== Snake gods ==
The anthropomorphic basis of many myth-systems meant snake-gods were rarely depicted solely as snakes. Exceptions to this were the Fijian creator-god Ndengei, the dozen creator-gods of the Solomon Islands (each with different responsibilities), the Aztec Mother Goddess Coatlicue, and the Voodoo snake-spirits Damballa, Simbi and Petro. Snake-gods were more often portrayed as hybrids or shape-shifters; for example, North American snake-spirits could change between human and serpentine forms whilst keeping the characteristics of both. Likewise, the Korean snake goddess Eobshin was portrayed as a black snake that had human ears.

The Mayan sky-goddess was associated with snakes. However, in her case, the snakes leaned into her ears and whispered the secrets of the universe (i.e. the secrets of herself). In Indian myth, Shiva had a cobra coiled on his head and another at rest on his shoulder, ready to strike his enemies. Egyptian myth has had several snake-gods, from the 'coiled one' Mehen who assisted Ra in fighting Aapep every day to the two-headed Nehebkau who guarded the underworld. In Korean mythology, the goddess Eobshin was the snake goddess of wealth, as snakes ate rats and mice that gnawed on the crops.

The Horned Serpent appears in the mythologies of many Native Americans. Details vary among tribes, with many of the stories associating the mystical figure with water, rain, lightning and thunder. Horned Serpents were major components of the Southeastern Ceremonial Complex of North American prehistory.

=== Ancient Mesopotamia ===
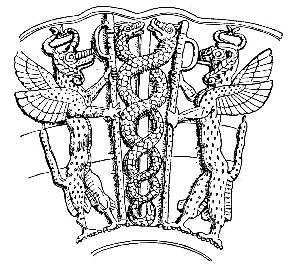
The "libation vase of Gudea" with the dragon Mushussu, dedicated to Ningishzida (twentieth century BC short chronology). The caduceus is interpreted as depicting the god himself.

In ancient Mesopotamia, Nirah, the messenger god of Ištaran, was represented as a serpent on kudurrus, or boundary stones. Representations of two intertwined serpents are common in Sumerian art and Neo-Sumerian artwork and still appear sporadically on cylinder seals and amulets until as late as the thirteenth century BC. The horned viper (Cerastes cerastes) appears in Kassite and Neo-Assyrian kudurrus and is invoked in Assyrian texts as a magical protective entity. A dragon-like creature with horns, the body and neck of a snake, the forelegs of a lion, and the hind-legs of a bird appears in Mesopotamian art from the Akkadian Period until the Hellenistic Period (323 BC–31 BC). This creature, known in Akkadian as the mušḫuššu, meaning "furious serpent", was used as a symbol for particular deities and also as a general protective emblem. It seems to have originally been the attendant of the Underworld god Ninazu, but later became the attendant to the Hurrian storm-god Tishpak, as well as, later, Ninazu's son Ningishzida, the Babylonian national god Marduk, the scribal god Nabu, and the Assyrian national god Ashur.

=== Quetzalcoatl ===
The Aztec spirit of intelligence and the wind, Quetzalcoatl ("Plumed Serpent"). Although not entirely a snake, the plumed serpent, Quetzalcoatl, in Mesoamerican cultures, particularly Mayan and Aztec, held a multitude of roles as a deity. He was viewed as a twin entity which embodied that of god and man and equally man and serpent, yet was closely associated with fertility. In ancient Aztec mythology, Quetzalcoatl was the son of the fertility earth goddess, Cihuacoatl, and cloud serpent and hunting god, Mixcoatl. His roles took the form of everything from bringer of morning winds and bright daylight for healthy crops, to a sea god capable of bringing on great floods. As shown in the images there are images of the sky serpent with its tail in its mouth, it is believed to be a reverence to the sun, for which Quetzalcoatl was also closely linked.

== Rituals ==
The Hopi people of North America performed an annual snake dance to celebrate the union of Snake Youth (a Sky spirit) and Snake Girl (an Underworld spirit), and to renew fertility of Nature. During the dance, live snakes were handled and at the end of the dance the snakes were released into the fields to guarantee good crops. "The snake dance is a prayer to the spirits of the clouds, the thunder and lightning, that the rain may fall on the growing crops.." In the northwestern Indian city, Banaras, a festival called Naga Pancami is celebrated during the rainy season of Sravana (July/August) to pay homage to the supernatural snakes or deities. Thousands of people gather around snake pools called Naga kuan that are said to lead to Nagaloka, the lavish underwater world of these snake deities or Nagas. Worshippers bathe in and jump from the ledges into the pools as a way to honor them and ensure that they provide things like fertility of the land and its people, and protection from the poisons (wrath) of its bite. In this region, females are more numbered as the worshippers of Nagas, which most closely resemble religious ritual.

== See also ==
- Ahi or Vritra - a serpent or dragon in Hinduism, the personification of drought
- Atum - an ancient Egyptian deity of creation, sometimes depicted as a serpent
- Bobbi-Bobbi - to the Binbinga people of northern Australia, a huge supernatural snake who lived in the heavens in the Dreamtime
- Echidna - in Greek mythology, a half-woman and half-snake monster
- Glycon— an ancient snake god, having a large and influential cult within the Roman Empire in the 2nd century; the contemporary satirist Lucian proclaimed the god a hoax, supposedly represented by a hand puppet
- Illuyankas - a serpentine dragon in Hittite mythology
- Leviathan - a monstrous Biblical sea serpent
- Meretseger - an ancient Egyptian cobra-goddess
- Nehustan - a Biblical bronze serpent which God told Moses to erect, but was later destroyed when it became an idol
- Rod of Asclepius - a serpent-entwined rod wielded by the Greek god Asclepius, a deity associated with healing and medicine
- Serpents in the Bible
- Serpent (symbolism)
- Snakes in Chinese mythology
- Tefnut - an ancient Egyptian deity of moisture, sometimes depicted as a lion-headed serpent
- Sheshnag - an ancient hindu god, supposedly he keeps earth on his head
