= Kulla =

Kulla may refer to:

- Kulla (god), god of builders in the Mesopotamian mythology. He is responsible for the creation of bricks and restoration of temples.
- Kulla (goddess), an alternate name of Ukulla, a goddess regarded as the wife of the Mesopotamian god Tishpak.
- Kulla, Estonia, village in Halliste Parish, Viljandi County, Estonia
- Kulla, Republic of Dagestan, a rural locality in Dagestan, Russia
- Kulla, Gurdaspur, Indian village in the Batala sub-district of Punjab
- Kulla, Amritsar, Indian village in the Patti sub-district of Punjab
- Kulla, Madhya Pradesh, Indian village in the Banda sub-district of Sagar district
- Kulla Habibpur, Indian village in the Etah sub-district of Uttar Pradesh
- A sub-caste of the Mangrio tribe of Sindh and Rajasthan
- Tower houses in the Balkans, tower houses built in the Balkans
- Pellumb Kulla (born 1940), Albanian diplomat and author
