= Labbu =

Mesopotamian creation epic

The Labbu Myth is an ancient Mesopotamian creation epic. Only one copy of it is known from the Library of Ashurbanipal. It is commonly dated no later than the Old Babylonian period, although recent work suggests a later composition. It is a folktale possibly of the Diyala region, since the later version seems to feature the god Tišpak as its protagonist and may be an allegory representing his replacement of the chthonic serpent-god Ninazu at the top of the pantheon of the city of Eshnunna. This part is played by Nergal in the earlier version. It was possibly a precursor of the Enûma Eliš, where Labbu – meaning "Raging One" or "lion", was the prototype of Tiamat and of the Canaanite religion tale of Baal fighting Yamm. Other similar texts include the Myth of Anzu and KAR 6.

Depending on the reading of the first character in the antagonist's name (always written as KAL and may be read as: Lab, Kal, Rib or Tan), the text might also be called The Slaying of Labbu or Kalbu Myth. This polyvalence of cuneiform readings allows a possible connection to the biblical monster Rahab.

== Text ==
The following translation of the Labbu Myth comes from Ayali-Darshan 2020.

The cities became dilapidated, the lands [...]

The people decreased in number [...]

To their lamentation [... did] no[t ...]

On their cry, he has no [pity].

'Who [created] the serpent (MUŠ)?'

'Sea [created] the serpent,

Enlil in heaven designed [his shape]:

His length is 50 bēru (-measure), [his width] one bēru,

Half a nindanu (-measure) his mouth, one ninandu [his ...],

One nindanu the span of [his] e[ars].

For five nindanu he [...] birds,

In the water, nine amma (-measure deep) he drags [...]

He raises his tail [...]'.

All the gods of heaven [were afraid]

In heaven, the gods bowed down before [...]

And the moon's [face] was darkened at its edges.

'Who will go and [kill] Labb[u]?

(Who) will sa[ve ...] the broad land

And exercis[e] kingship [...]?'

'Go, Tišpak, k[ill] Labbu!

Save the broad land [...]!

And exercise kingship [...]!'

You have sent me, O lord, [to kill] the offspring of the River (nāri),

(But) I do not know Labbu's [countenance].

[...] He opened his mouth and [spoke] to [...]:

'Make the clouds (and) the terrible storm arise [...]

[Hold] in front of you the seal (of) your neck,

Shoot (it) and ki[ll] Labbu!'

(Then) he made the clouds (and) the terrible storm [...]

The seal (of) his neck (he held) in front of him,

He shot (it) and [killed] Labbu.

For three years, three months, day and ni[ght]

the blood of Labbu flowed [...].

== Synopsis ==
Extant in two very fragmentary copies; an Old Babylonian one and a later Assyrian from the Library of Ashurbanipal, which have no complete surviving lines – the Labbu Myth relates the tale of a possibly leonine but certainly serpentine monster: a fifty-league long Bašmu (^{muš}ba-aš-ma) or sixty-league long Mušḫuššu (MUŠ-ḪUŠ), depending on the version and reconstruction of the text. The opening of the Old Babylonian version recalls that of the Epic of Gilgamesh:

The cities sigh, the people...
The people decreased in number,...
For their lamentation there was none to...

The vast dimensions of Labbu are described. The sea (tāmtu) has given birth to the dragon (line 6). The fragmentary line: "He raises his tail..." identifies him according to Neil Forsyth as a precursor of a later adversary; the dragon of Revelation 12:4, whose tail swept a third of the stars of heaven, and cast them down to earth.

In the later version, Labbu is created by the god Enlil who "drew [a picture of] the dragon in the sky" to wipe out humanity whose raucous noise has been disturbing his sleep, a recurring motif in Babylonian creation epics. Whether this refers to the Milky Way (Heidel 1963) or a comet (Forsyth 1989) is not clear. The gods are terrified by the apparition of this monstrous creature and appeal to the moon god Sin or the goddess Aruru who addresses Tišpak/Nergal to counter the threat and "exercise kingship", presumably over Eshnunna, as a reward. Tišpak/Nergal raises objections to tangling with the serpent but – after a gap in the narrative, a god whose name is not preserved provides guidance on military strategy. A storm erupts and the victor, who may or may not be Tišpak or Nergal, in accordance with the advice given, fires an arrow to slay the beast.

The fragments of the epic are not part of a cosmogony as noted by Forsyth; since the cities of men are already in existence when the narrative takes place. Frans Wiggerman interpreted the myth's function as a way of justifying Tishpak's ascension to status of king, "as a consequence of his 'liberation' of the nation, sanctioned by the decision of a divine council."

== Rahab ==
Rahab is one of the various names for the primordial "chaos dragons" mentioned in the Bible (cf. Leviathan, Tiamat/Tehom, and Tannin). As Cuneiform is a complex syllabary, with some signs functioning as logograms, some signs representing multiple phonetic values, and some representing sumerograms, multiple readings are possible. The first syllable of Rahab, written with the sign KAL, might also be read as /reb/. Thus, Labbu could have also been called Rebbu (<*reb-bu), highly resembling the Hebrew monster mentioned in the Bible.
