= Ukulla =

Mesopotamian goddess, wife of Tishpak

- Major cult center: Eshnunna, Me-Turan, Dūr-Ukulla

Genealogy
- Spouse: Tishpak
- Children: Nanshak

Ukulla, also called Ugulla, Kulla or Kullab, was a Mesopotamian goddess regarded as the wife of Tishpak. She was chiefly worshiped in Eshnunna. Based on the variable spelling of her name in cuneiform it has been suggested that much like her husband and their son Nanshak she had neither Sumerian nor Akkadian origin.

== Name and character ==
Ukulla is the oldest attested form of the name, but multiple variants are attested and the orthography varies between sources. Seemingly both the u in the front and a b in the end were viewed as optional. Manfred Krebernik suggests that the alternate writings were the result of confusion with the brick god Kulla and with the toponym Kullaba. As of 2022 there is no single agreed upon spelling in secondary literature. This article employs the form Ukulla following the corresponding Reallexikon der Assyriologie und Vorderasiatischen Archäologie entry.

In early scholarship, attempts were made to prove the theonym Ukulla was derived from Sumerian u_{3}-gul (utnēnu, "prayer"), an element of the compound verb u_{3}-gul ga_{2}-ga_{2}. According to Frans Wiggermann, while a Sumerian origin is not entirely impossible, Akkadian can be ruled out, and ultimately it is most likely that the name was not derived from either language, similarly as the names of two closely related deities, Tishpak and Nanshak. This view is also supported by Krebernik. Irene Sibbing-Plantholt suggests that some of the writings might indicate the development of a folk etymology according to which the name would be understood as u_{2} kul-a(b), "collect (medicinal) plants!"

Ukulla could be referred to as the "queen of Eshunna". A source from Me-Turan labels her as mu-nus sa_{6}-ga, "beautiful woman." In a late hymn dedicated to Bau, KAR 109, she is described as "Ukulla, who creates meadows, who surveys the universe" (^{d}Ú-kul-la ba-nit re-i-ti ḫa-i-ṭa-at kul-la-ti), which appears to be an attempt at providing her name with an explanatory scholarly etymology.

== Associations with other deities ==
Ukulla was the wife of Tishpak and mother of Nanshak. A seal with the inscription labeling its owner as a servant of both Ukulla and her husband is known.

Frans Wiggermann identifies two instances where she instead occurs as the wife of Ninazu, one of them in an Old Babylonian god list and the other in a single late text. Irene Sibbing-Plantholt in a more recent publication argues there is only one text attesting the existence of such a tradition, an Old Babylonian balag song from Me-Turan. Ninazu's wife was otherwise usually Ningirida, also labeled as the mother of his son Ningishzida. However, Sibbing-Plantholt points out she is not attested in association with the city of Eshunna, and on this basis argues it is not impossible she was not viewed as the wife of Ninazu there, which according to her makes it possible Ukulla functioned as the wife of both Tishpak and his Sumerian counterpart in this case.

Despite the similarity between their names, Ukulla is not to be confused with the medicine goddess Gula, and most likely should also be understood as separate from another homonymous theonym, Gu_{2}-la_{2} (this name might be derived from a term which can be translated as "to lean over" or "embrace"), designating a goddess who was associated with Abu. All three of them occur separately from each other in the Nippur god list. In later periods Gu_{2}-la_{2} is not attested, which might indicate that she was absorbed by either Ukulla or Gula.

== Worship ==
The oldest certain attestations of Ukulla go back to the early Old Babylonian period. The only possible earlier attestation is the Early Dynastic toponym giš.u_{3}.ku.kul-ab_{4}^{ki} (or giš.u_{3}-kul_{2}-la^{ki}), which might correspond to later Dūr-Ukulla, a settlement associated with her and named in her honor.

Eshnunna was Ukulla's main cult center, and she had two separate shrines in this city. One of them, the Ganun, was possibly located in the Esikila, the temple of Tishpak, and the other might have been separate and dedicated to her alone. The kings of Eshunna were involved in her cult, as evidenced by her presence in their year names and the offerings of oil and beer made on behalf of the royal palace. References to the preparation of a statue of her and a table are known from, respectively, Me-Turan and Eshnunna. A month in the local calendar used in both of these cities was named after her.

It has been suggested that a deity named ^{d}Kúl-lá, attested in the theophoric name of a lady-in-waiting from Mari, ^{d}Kúl-lá-ḫa-zi-ra-at, might be Ukulla.
