= Abu (god) =

Mesopotamian god

- A statue formerly believed to be a depiction of Abu, now instead assumed to represent a worshiper.
- Major cult center: Eshnunna

Genealogy
- Parents: Ninhursag and either Enki or Enlil
- Spouse: gu_{2}-la_{2}

Abu was a Mesopotamian god. His character is poorly understood, though it is assumed he might have been associated with vegetation and with snakes. He was often paired with the deity gu_{2}-la_{2}, initially regarded as distinct from Gula, but later conflated with her.

== Name and character ==
The reading of the second sign in the name ab-u_{2} is uncertain, and in addition to Abu, the second proposed reading of the name is Abba. According to Jeremiah Peterson, the former option is supported by the partial etymology assigned to this theonym in the myth Enki and Ninmah, lugal u_{2}, "lord of the plants." It might be either an example of scribal wordplay or an invented scholarly etymology for his name. As pointed out by Gianni Marchesi, for the assumed pun on the name to work, it would have to end in the phoneme u. Dina Katz translates Abu's name as "father plant." However, it is generally assumed the theonym is unrelated to Akkadian abum, "father."

Abu's character is poorly known. Irene Sibbing-Plantholt suggests that in the Diyala area he was associated with snakes and the underworld, while in the south of Mesopotamia he instead functioned as a vegetation deity related to various dying gods. However, Gianni Marchesi and Nicolo Marchetti argue that the only evidence for his connection with plant life is an epithet assigned to him in Enki and Ninhursag, which might not represent his actual functions. In this myth, he is the first of the deities created by Ninhursag to relieve Enki's pain, the other seven being Ninsikila (Meskilak), Ningirida, Ninkasi, Nanshe, Azimua, Ninti and Inzak. He is specifically tasked with dealing with the pain of the scalp, which is most likely a pun on his name and the Akkadian word abbuttu.

== Associations with other deities ==
=== Gula ===
Due to their frequent juxtaposition, it is assumed that Abu's spouse was the goddess gu_{2}-la_{2}, whose role in the Mesopotamian pantheon remains poorly known. According to Jeremiah Peterson, while gu_{2}-la_{2} eventually came to be treated as an alternate orthography of the theonym Gula, she was most likely originally a distinct deity, and might have still been recognized as such in the Old Babylonian period. Authors who support the view these two homophonous goddesses were originally separate include Marcos Such-Gutiérrez, Joan Goodnick Westenholz and Irene Sibbing-Plantholt. Abu and gu_{2}-la_{2} appear together in the Nippur god list, where gu_{2}-la_{2} and Gula are kept apart, in other god lists, and in an Old Babylonian seal inscription. In the Weidner god list and in An = Anum Gula is listed as the spouse of Abu, though in the former case the presence of a separate entry for a deity Gulazida, "the true Gula," might indicate that the spouse of Abu and the healing goddess were treated as separate, while the latter might be an example of late confusion. In addition to Gula, gu_{2}-la_{2} might have also been conflated or confused with Ukulla, the wife of Tishpak.

=== Ibaum ===
According to Irene Sibbing-Plantholt, Abu might correspond to the deity Ipaḫum (or Iba'um), "viper." He was apparently understood as the divine vizier (sukkal) of Ningishzida, though according to Frans Wiggermann he might have originally been associated with Ninazu in the third millennium BCE. A city named after him, Bāb-Iba'um, existed in the proximity of the Diyala River, and appears in four year formulas of king Bilalama of Eshnunna. Despite his name, Iba'um might have been depicted in anthropomorphic form on cylinder seals.

=== Other relations ===
A non-standard god list from Nippur places Abu next to Bau, presumably based on their shared connection to Lagash and the graphic similarity between their names. Gebhard Selz points out that a tradition in which Abu was her son is also attested, and proposes that it might be related to the fact that under Uru'inimgina a field associated with Abu has been reassigned to Bau. Abu could also be viewed as a son of Ninhursag and either Enki or Enlil. A further deity who might correspond to Abu is Abba, the doorkeeper of the Esagil. Identifying Abu with either Dumuzi or Ninurta is limited to texts from the late second and early first millennium BCE.

== Worship ==
Abu is attested in theophoric names from Shuruppak and Lagash from the Early Dynastic period, such as Ur-Abu or Shubur-Abu. He was also one of the gods worshiped in the "trans-Tigridian" area, between the Tigris and the Zagros Mountains. A copper bowl inscribed with a dedication to him has been found in Eshnunna, though it is not certain if it comes from the Early Dynastic or Old Akkadian period. However, a building excavated in the same area sometimes referred to as the temple of Abu in older literature likely did not fulfill such a function in antiquity, and the statue found inside is now agreed to be a representation of a donor rather than a deity. In Lagash, a field named after Abu apparently existed, and an inscription refers to it "Lugalanda's own field." In the Ur III period, Abu received offerings in Kuara in the local temple of Ninsun alongside this goddess, her husband Lugalbanda, Dumuzi and Geshtinanna.
