= Ištaran =

Mesopotamian god

- God of justice
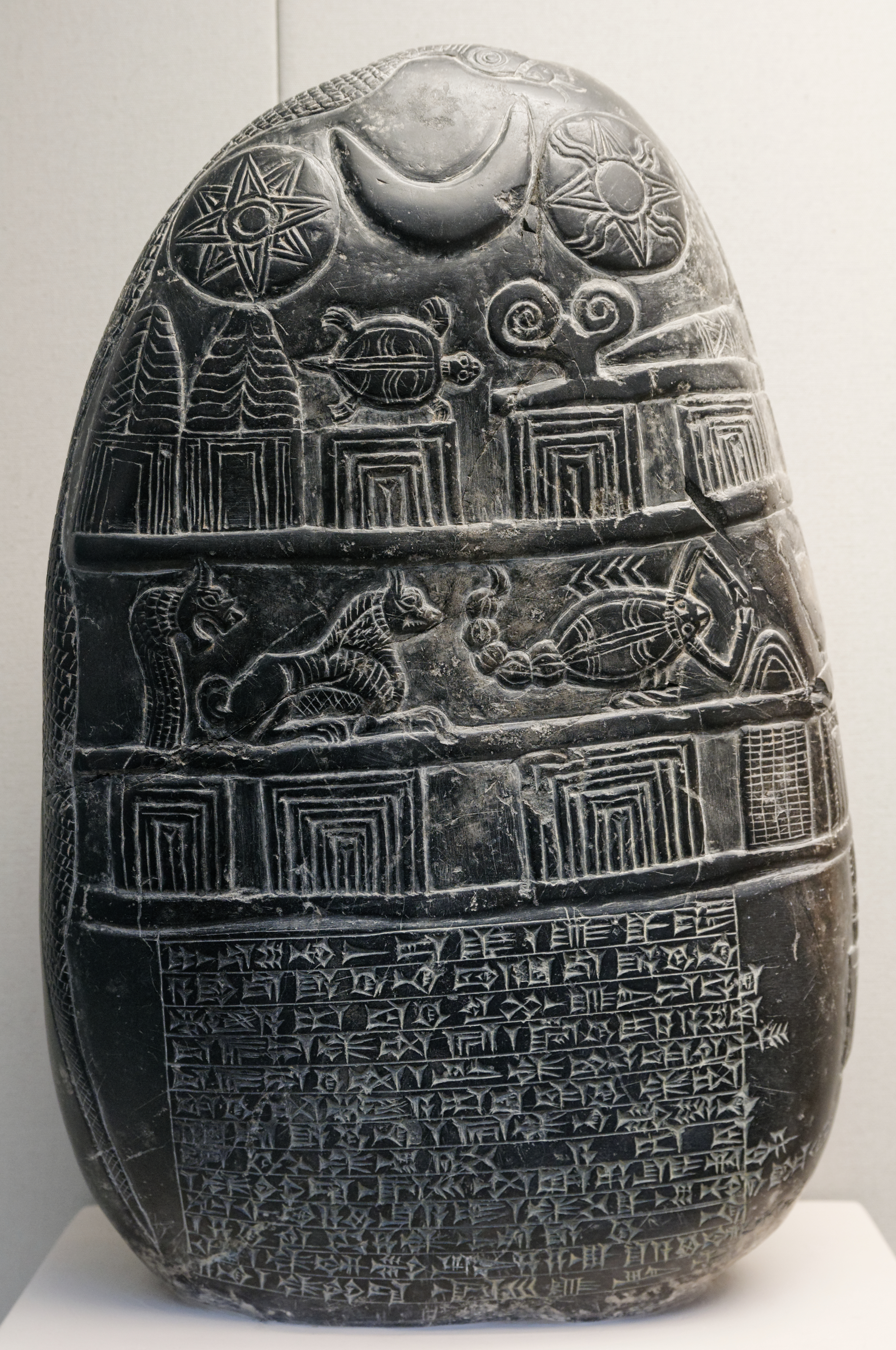
- Snake god Nirah, a symbol (or messenger) of Ištaran, on upper edge of kudurru. The snake symbol is often found on the edge of a kudurru, "enclosing" the stone document.
- Major cult center: Der
- Symbol: snake (Nirah)

Genealogy
- Spouse: Šarrat-Deri or Manzat
- Children: Nirah (sometimes); Zīzānu (possibly)

Ištaran (Ishtaran; Sumerian: 𒀭𒅗𒁲) was a Mesopotamian god who was the tutelary deity of the city of Der, a city-state located east of the Tigris, in the proximity of the borders of Elam. It is known that he was a divine judge, and his position in the Mesopotamian pantheon was most likely high, but much about his character remains uncertain. He was associated with snakes, especially with the snake god Nirah, and it is possible that he could be depicted in a partially or fully serpentine form himself. He is first attested in the Early Dynastic period in royal inscriptions and theophoric names. He appears in sources from the reign of many later dynasties as well. When Der attained independence after the Ur III period, local rulers were considered representatives of Ištaran. In later times, he retained his position in Der, and multiple times his statue was carried away by Assyrians to secure the loyalty of the population of the city.

== Name ==
Ištaran's name could be written in cuneiform as ^{d}KA.DI or ^{d}MUŠ. In the case of the first of these logograms, the reading Ištaran has been established as correct by Wilfred G. Lambert in 1969. Other, now obsolete, proposals included Sataran, Satran, Gusilim, and Eatrana. Also attested are a variant form, Iltaran, and an Emesal one, Ezeran (or Ezzeran). The latter logogram could also designate the messenger (šipru) of Ištaran, Nirah, as well as the tutelary god of Susa, Inshushinak, the tutelary god of Eshnunna, Tishpak, and the primordial river deity Irḫan. With a different determinative, ^{mul}MUŠ, it referred to the constellation Hydra, which could be associated with Ištaran. Sometimes ^{d}DI.KU was used to render the name Ištaran as well, though these signs were also used to designate other judge deities, such as Mandanu and Diku (the deification of the Sumerian word "judge").

It is commonly assumed that Ištaran's name originated in a Semitic language. It has been proposed that it was etymologically related to Ishtar. Christopher Woods suggests that the suffix -an should be understood as plural, and translates the name as "the two Ishtars", which he assumes might have been a way to refer to the morning and evening star. He suggests that Ištaran was formed through syncretism of an Ishtar-like deity and a local snake god. However, the linguistic association between the names Ištaran and Ishtar is not universally accepted. Richard L. Litke instead assumed that Ištaran's name was Elamite in origin due to the location of Der, and that it was difficult to render for Mesopotamian scribes as a result.

Ištaran could also be called Anu Rabû or AN.GAL, "Great Anu". In Elamite sources, the signs AN.GAL instead designate the god Napirisha, in the past incorrectly believed to be the same deity as Humban. Wouter Henkelman proposes a connection between these two deities based on this similarity, as well as their shared affinity with snakes and the fact that Der was located close to Elam.

== Character and iconography ==
Ištaran's character is poorly understood, even though he belonged to a "very high level in the pantheon". It is known that he was primarily viewed as a divine judge. His just character was regarded as proverbial, and kings such as Gudea of Lagash and Shulgi of Ur compared themselves to him in inscriptions to present themselves as equally just. An Old Babylonian adab song makes a similar comparison with Nergal in place of a king.

Based on Ištaran's placement in the proximity of Ereshkigal in the god list An = Anum it has been suggested that he was associated with the underworld. It is also known that he could be viewed as one of the Dumuzi-like mourned "dying gods", as attested in Sumerian litanies and in a late ritual from Assur, according to which his death took place in the summer. The latter text states that his corpse was beaten and the blood reached the underworld. In a single text, he and Dumuzi are outright equated with each other. Irene Sibbing-Plantholt argues he could also be associated with healing. She notes that in a text from Malgium the theophoric name Ištarān-asû occurs, asû being a term translated either as "physician" or more broadly "healer". Based on Ištaran's alternate name, Anu Rabû, it has also been proposed that he was associated with the sky. It has been argued that in art his possible celestial aspect might have been represented by rays coming out of his shoulders. In one of the Temple Hymns, he is referred to as lugal dubur anna, "lord of the base of heaven".

According to Wilfred G. Lambert, Ištaran's face was regarded as beautiful. A lament refers to him as "bright-eyed". He was also associated with snakes. In the Temple Hymns, the entrance to his temple is said to be decorated with an image of intertwined mušḫuššu and horned viper (muš-šag_{4}-tur_{3}). It is also possible that depictions of snakes on kudurru (boundary stones) represented Ištaran as a judge deity resolving conflicts over land. Frans Wiggermann additionally assumes that a god depicted with the upper body of a human and the lower body of a snake, known from cylinder seals from the Sargonic period, might be Ištaran. Christopher Woods instead proposes that this figure is Nirah. Wiggermann argues this is implausible, as Nirah was a servant deity, while the snake god according to him is depicted as an "independent lord". He also notes a similar figure, though seated on a serpent throne rather than directly partially serpentine himself, is also present on seals from Susa, and might represent Inshushinak. He argues that both of these gods, as well as other deities, such as Ninazu, Ningishzida, Tishpak and the so-called boat god belonged to a group he refers to as "transtigridian snake gods" due to their similar character and iconography and the location of their cult centers. He assumes all of them developed on the boundary between Mesopotamian and Elamite culture.

== Associations with other deities ==
=== Family and court ===
Ištaran could be viewed as a son of Anu and Urash, and as a result the Old Babylonian Nippur god list associates him with Uruk. Marten Stol assumes that both Ištaran and Inshushinak were regarded as sons of Tishpak by the compiler of the god list An = Anum. A list of city gods from Ur groups them together. A late ritual known from Assur addresses Ishtar as Ištaran's sister.

In An = Anum, Ištaran appears without a wife, but in an inscription of Esarhaddon this role is assigned to the goddess Šarrat-Deri, "Queen of Der". or Deritum, "she of Der". There is also some evidence that Manzat, a goddess regarded as the divine representation of the rainbow, was viewed as his wife. Irene Sibbing-Plantholt notes that based on the reference to this tradition in a syncretistic hymn to Nanaya it can be assumed that she was worshiped in Der alongside him in either the late second millennium BCE or in the first millennium BCE.

Nirah was the messenger (šipru) of Ištaran. He could also be viewed as his son. The god Zīzānu was either another son of Ištaran or a son of Qudma, his sukkal (attendant deity). Further members of his court include the deities Rāsu, Turma and Itūr-mātiššu.

=== Foreign equivalents and syncretism ===
In an Old Babylonian bilingual Akkadian-Amorite god list, Ištaran's counterpart in the Amorite column is aš-ti-ul-ḫa-al-ti. Andrew R. George and Manfred Krebernik note that this name might have an Elamite origin, and that the presence of such a deity in the Amorite pantheon is not impossible, as they inhabited the area of Emutbalum close to Der and Elam, and the well known Amorite leader Kudur-Mabuk and his father Simti-Šilḫak both bore Elamite names.

A bilingual Hurro-Akkadian version of the Weidner god list from Emar seemingly regards Ištaran, misspelled as ^{d}KA.DI.DI (possibly an example of dittography, an error involving reduplication of a sign) and Kumarbi (usually associated with Enlil or Syrian Dagan) as equivalents. Frank Simons assumes that this connection might be based on their shared association with the underworld, on shared perception as the "Father of Gods" (a prayer to Nisaba refers to ^{d}MUŠ as "father of the gods," though direct references to Ištaran in such a role are not known), or possibly on an unknown myth about Ištaran which resembled the Hurrian myths pertaining to Kumarbi's dethroning.

It is possible that in the late first millennium, attempts at syncretising Ištaran and Anu were made during a period of cooperation between the theologians from Uruk, Nippur and Der, but direct evidence is presently lacking.

A late god list equating various deities with Marduk mentions Anu Rabû among them, but the translation of the explanatory line is uncertain.

In tablet III of the "Epic of Anzû," Ištaran is listed as one of the names of Ninurta along with other names of deities that are claimed to be equivalents of him in this composition, namely Zababa, Pabilsag, Inshushinak (described as bēl pirišti, "lord of secrets"), Ninazu, Panigara (an alternate spelling of the name Panigingarra), Ḫurabtil (labeled as an Elamite god), Lugal-Marada, and even Lugalbanda (a legendary king of Uruk) and Papsukkal (a messenger god, sukkal of Zababa). Andrew R. George suggests that based on their placement in documents such as the Canonical Temple List, it is possible that some of these gods - Ištaran, Inshushinak, Zababa and Lugal-Marada - could be seen as "local manifestations" of Ninurta by the ancient theologians responsible for compilation of such texts. Michael P. Streck emphasizes that such associations would be typical mostly for late theology.

== Worship ==
Ištaran was the tutelary god of Der. His temple located there was known under the ceremonial Sumerian name Edimgalkalamma, "House, Great Bond of the Land". A library was attached to it, and it is known the scribes of Der were in contact with those from Uruk and Babylon. However, as of 2010, only seven tablets whose colophons state they originate in Der are known.

Oldest attestations of Ištaran are royal inscriptions from the Early Dynastic period from Lagash and Umma, and one of such texts attributed to Entemena relays how Mesalim of Kish at the command of Ištaran demarcated the border between these two states, represented by their gods Ningirsu and Shara. It has been proposed that Ištaran was understood as a neutral party, similarly to how Dagan was portrayed in similar texts from contemporary Syria, and as such as a suitable deity to ask for resolution of such conflicts. Another Early Dynastic ruler, Lugalzagesi, called himself a "beloved friend of Ištaran". Theophoric names invoking Ištaran also first appear in sources from the Early Dynastic period.

Evidence for the worship of Ishtaran in the Sargonic period includes a mace head dedicated to him by Naram-Sin of Akkad, found in Ur, and theophoric names from Adab, such as Ur-Ištaran. Gudea, who reigned after the fall of the Akkadian Empire, in an inscription compared himself to Ištaran, asserting that like him he would declare just judgments not only for Sumerians and Akkadians, but even for "a brute from Gutium". In the following Ur III period, king Shulgi patronized the Edimgalkalamma. A Sumerian text from the third millennium BCE found in Susa, where it was presumably brought in the aftermath of an Elamite raid, also mentions work undertaken in his temple in Der, might predate his dynasty, but the name of the ruler responsible for it is lost. One of Shulgi's daughters bore the name ME-Ištaran (reading of the first element uncertain), as attested in documents from the Garšana archive, which detail matters related to her estate located there and mention her marriage to a certain Shu-Kabta, a man who was apparently both a physician and a military official.

The formula "favorite of Ištaran, beloved of Inanna" (migir Ištaran, naram Inanna) was used by the viceroys of Der Ilum-muttabil (also read Anum-muttabil), Nidnuša, and a third holder of this office whose name is not preserved. They reigned during Der's period of independence after the fall of the Third Dynasty of Ur. In this period the rulers of Der were considered representatives of Ištaran on earth, which is presumed to parallel the development of similar models of rulership in Eshnunna and Assur, where the local rulers similarly were believed to act as governors on behalf of Tishpak and Ashur, respectively. An inscription of Ilum-Muttabil indicates that he dedicated a new construction project to Ištaran too, but it is unknown if it refers to a temple. Eckhart Frahm notes that it is not impossible repairs of Edimgalkalamma are described in it, though he due to their poor preservation of the text cannot be established with certainty.

In a royal inscription preserved on a clay cylinder found in Ur, Sin-Iddinam of Larsa recorded that after defeating and taking captive an enemy ruler, Warassa, he entrusted him to Ištaran and released his imprisoned troops, and states that the king declared he took these actions "In order that my name is mentioned in Der in remote (days)". Warassa might have ruled over either Der itself, much like his namesake known from sources contemporary with the reign of Hammurabi of Babylon, or nearby Malgium; the third proposed location he might have hailed from, Eshnunna, is considered unlikely, as Sin-Iddinam refers to him as lugal, rather than ensi_{2}, the typical title of Eshnunnean rulers. An inscription of the Assyrian king Ilu-šūma mentions Ištaran and his city in passing. This text is the oldest known reference to cities other than Assur in Assyrian royal inscriptions. In the Old Babylonian period, a man bearing the theophoric name Ištaran-nasir was a merchant active in Carchemish and was in contact with Zimri-Lim, the king of Mari, informing him about events such as a festival of Nubandag and the death of king Aplahanda.

In the Kassite period, Edimgalkalamma was rebuilt during the reign of one of the two kings bearing the Kurigalzu (Kurigalzu I or Kurigalzu II). The 1920 discovery of a text documenting this event contributed towards identifying its findspot, Tell Aqar, as the location of Der. He is also referenced in an inscription from Susa from the reign of one of the Kurigalzua, and possibly in another from Babylon also attributed to one of them. Furthermore, he appears in eleven theophoric names from Nippur from the Kassite period, with further five invoking "Anu Rabû". He is also one of the few Mesopotamian gods attested in linguistically Kassite theophoric names, which usually invoked Kassite deities rather than Mesopotamian ones. Multiple people bearing theophoric names invoking Ištaran (^{d}KA.DI or AN.GAL) are also attested in the documents of the First Sealand dynasty, and Ran Zadok proposes that these individuals originally came from Der. He is also invoked in the Elamite name Kuk-Ištaran, "protection of Ištaran".

An inscription of king Marduk-nadin-ahhe of the Second Dynasty of Isin mentions Anu Rabû as the last god in a long sequence of deities, immediately after Išḫara.

In later periods Ištaran was worshiped in the treasury of the Ešarra temple in Assur. Assyrians also intervened a number of times in the religious affairs of Der, and repeatedly carried off and returned the statue of Ištaran in order to ensure the loyalty of local inhabitants. During the reign of Shamshi-Adad V, statues of the deities of Der, including Ištaran, as well as Šarrat-Deri, Mār-bīti, Urkitum, Saĝkud of Bubê and others, were seized by the Assyrian army which attacked the city, as documented in a letter of this king addressed to the god Ashur. They were later returned by Adad-nirari III. The city god was however subsequently taken away once more on the orders of Sennacherib to punish the local population for their earlier support of the Elamite king Ḫallušu-Inšušinak, who campaigned in Mesopotamia against Aššur-nādin-šumi, the Assyrian ruler's son and governor of Babylonia. However, he was once again returned when Esarhaddon ascended to the throne, which was a part of a broader process of reversal of his predecessor's policy towards southern cities. He also renovated the Edmigalkalamma, which was damaged in an Elamite invasion during the reign of Enlil-nadin-šumi. Esarhaddon's efforts were subsequently continued by his son Ashurbanipal, as documented in three texts from Nineveh. Most likely the work in Der was stretched over the course of multiple years, starting before 652 BCE and concluding at some point between 647 and 645 BCE. A text from Ashurbanipal's reign also mentions Ištaran (under the name Anu Rabû) as one of the deities who aided this king during a campaign against Elam (653 BCE) alongside Ashur, Lugal-asal, Marduk, Nabu and Shamash.

Ištaran most likely continued to be worshiped in Der until the city was deserted in either the Seleucid or Parthian period. While in the past it was assumed that theophoric names invoking him stopped being used after the Kassite period, more recent research shows that scribes from Der still bore such names in the late first millennium BCE.

== Mythology ==
A fragmentary text known Abu Salabikh and Ebla mentions a group consisting of Shamash, Ištaran, the river god ^{d}ÍD and Nammu. The connection between Ištaran and Shamash was based on their shared association with justice, and later recurs for example in inscriptions of Gudea. Like them, ^{d}ÍD was a divine judge, and Nammu's presence might be the result of association between him and this goddess attested elsewhere.

The Hymn to Nanshe mentions Ištaran in his role of a divine judge, possibly in association with Ningishzida.

Ištaran is also mentioned in the Epic of Erra, where he forsakes the inhabitants of Der after they start acting violently. He is also the only deity to resist Erra's destructive rampage.

A Neo-Assyrian copy of a lament originally dealing only with the death of Damu contains the names of nine deities who met the same fate, including Ištaran.
