= Alla (Mesopotamian god) =

Mesopotamian god

- Sukkal of Ningishzida
- Major cult center: Esagi
- Symbols: staff

Alla or Alla-gula was a Mesopotamian god associated with the underworld. He functioned as the sukkal (attendant deity) of Ningishzida, and most likely was a dying god similar to Dumuzi and Damu, but his character is not well known otherwise. It is known that the settlement Esagi was his cult center, but its location is presently unknown.

== Name and character ==
Alla's name was written in cuneiform either syllabically (^{d}Al-la or ^{d}Al-lá) or logographically (^{d}NAGAR). It might be related to or a pun on the Sumerian word al, "hoe". A variant form, Alla-gula, "Alla the great", is also attested. Additionally, the god list An = Anum indicates that he could be referred to with the Sumerian epithet Lugal-sapar, "lord of the net". (Note: The net is well attested as a divine weapon.)

The character of Alla is poorly understood, but it is agreed that he was associated with the underworld. He belonged to the circle of deities connected with Ninazu and Ningishzida, and functioned as the sukkal (divine attendant) of the latter. He is also well attested as one of the dying gods mentioned in lamentations, and on this basis it has been argued he was viewed as comparable to better known Dumuzi. According to Wilfred G. Lambert, a single Old Babylonian text seemingly outright equates them with each other. Comparisons with Damu have also been made in modern literature.

In art, Alla was depicted as a bald beardless man, and known representations do not wear the horned crown associated with divinity in Mesopotamian art. Frans Wiggermann argues that he was additionally portrayed holding a staff, well attested as a badge of office of the sukkal.

=== Alla and Allatum ===
Wilfred G. Lambert proposed in 1980 that the goddess Allatum was the Akkadian feminine counterpart of Alla. However, in 1989 Gernot Wilhelm noted that no plausible Akkadian etymology has been proposed for her name, and the most likely possibility is that it was simply a variant spelling of Allani, the Hurrian goddess of the dead, whose name is related to the Hurrian word allai, mistress. This view has been accepted by Tonia Sharlach and Alfonso Archi in subsequent studies of this goddess . Sharlach entirely rules out a connection between Alla and Allatum/Allani based on their different roles and origin.

== Worship ==
Alla is attested chiefly in sources from the Ur III and Old Babylonian periods. The settlement Esagi is identified as his cult center in texts pertaining to dying deities, but its location is unknown. There is evidence that he was worshiped in Gišbanda, the cult center of Ningishzida, and it is possible a statue of him was located in the temple of that god in Lagash as well. He was also venerated in Ur, where he appears in offering lists alongside Ninazu, Ningirida, Ningishzida, Azimua and Ninpumuna. Additionally, the worship of "Alla-gula" is well attested in sources from Nippur from the Ur III period pertaining to the activities of queen Shulgi-simti.

== Late sources ==
In a bilingual myth (tablet KAR 4 and duplicates), mankind is created from the blood of a plurality of deities referred to with the logogram ^{d}NAGAR, variously interpreted as either Alla or Lamga in modern literature. According to Wilfred G. Lambert based on context the later option is implausible as the reading relies on the explanation ^{lam-ga d}NAGAR = ^{d}30 in a lexical list, which refers to a name of the moon god Sin. Manfred Krebernik notes that the account resembles the scene in Atrahasis where the blood of ^{d}W-e(-i-la) is used instead. Selena Wisnom points out Alla is also the name applied to the god in the Standard Babylonian version of Atrahasis, replacing Wê known from Old Babylonian copies. She suggests that in this context his name was understood as a pun on the word al, "hoe", referencing his role as a worker. On this basis she argues that a parallel exists between Alla and Qingu, whose name might be derived from the word kiĝ_{2}, "to work", and who in the Enūma Eliš is similarly killed after rebelling in order to provide blood needed for the creation for mankind. However, she stresses Qingu cannot be considered a direct equivalent of Alla and Wê, as he plays a more active role as an antagonist in the narrative before being killed.

In late sources, Alla is also attested in lists of so-called "seven conquered Enlils" alongside figures such as Mummu and Alalu. In this context, the theonym Enlil is used as a generic label. The deities designated as "conquered Enlils" were associated with Enmesharra.
