= Nirah =

Mesopotamian snake god

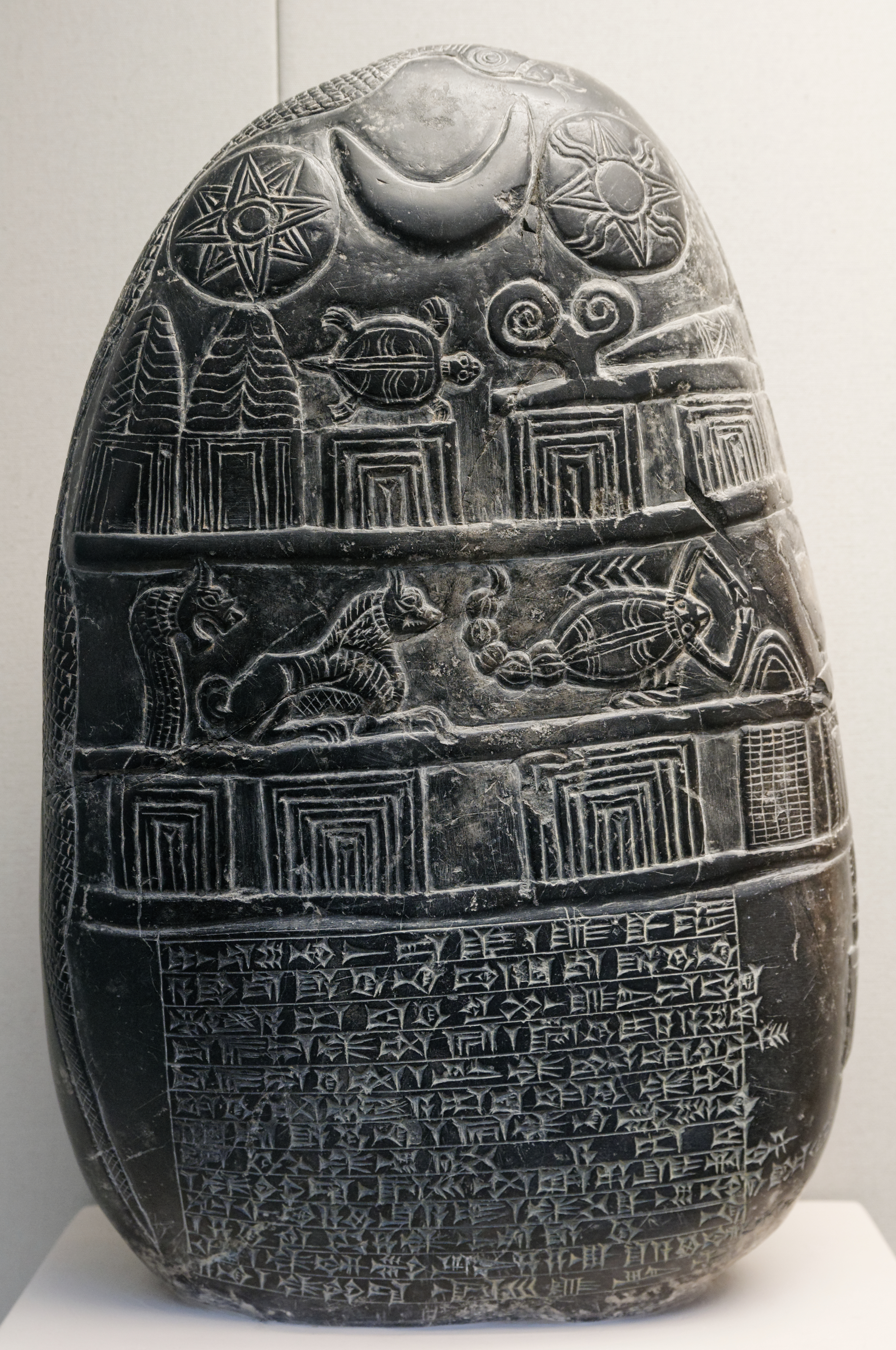
Nirah depicted as a snake on a kudurru (boundary stone). He is often found on the edge of a kudurru, "enclosing" the stone document (land boundary, or entitlement deed).

Nirah was a Mesopotamian god who served as the messenger (šipru) of Ištaran, the god of Der. He was depicted in the form of a snake.

== Name and character ==
The name Nirah means "little snake" in Sumerian. It could be written with the logogram ^{d}MUŠ (Sumerian: 𒀭𒈲), as already attested in third millennium BCE texts from Ebla. However, this logogram could also designate Ištaran, Ninazu, the tutelary god of Susa, Inshushinak, the tutelary god of Eshnunna, Tishpak, and the primordial river deity Irḫan. With a different determinative, ^{mul}MUŠ, it referred to the constellation Hydra. Syllabic spellings are also attested, for example Ne-ra-aḫ, Ni-laḫ_{5}, Ni-ra-aḫ and Ni-ra-ḫu.

Nirah was at times confused with Irḫan, originally the name of the western branch of the Euphrates, personified as a deity. The early history of these two deities is not fully understood, and it has been proposed that their names were cognate with each other, though the view that they shared the same origin is not universally accepted.

Nirah could be called the "lord of the underworld," though he shared this epithet with many other gods, including Ninazu, Ningishzida, Nergal, and the primordial deity Enmesharra.

Ropes or intestines could be compared to Nirah in Mesopotamian literature, for example in an inscription of Gudea, in a hymn to Shulgi, and in incantations.

== Iconography ==
No known sources indicate that Nirah was depicted in anthropomorphic form. The snakes depicted on kudurru are often identified as depictions of him in accompanying inscriptions. In many cases, the serpentine Nirah encircles the symbols of other deities. A snake depicted on a brick with an inscription of one of the two Kassite rulers bearing the name Kurigalzu (Kurigalzu I or Kurigalzu II) found near Der likely can be identified as Nirah. However, not every snake present in Mesopotamian art is necessarily Nirah, as some of them might instead represent other deities, such as Šibbu, Dunnanu, or the worm god Išqippu. Horned snakes are most likely representations of mythical beings such as Bašmu rather than Nirah.

It is sometimes assumed that a god depicted with the upper body of a human and the lower body of a snake, known from cylinder seals from the Sargonic period, might be Nirah. Frans Wiggermann argues this is implausible, as Nirah was a servant deity, while the snake god is depicted as an "independent lord," and as such is more likely to be Ištaran.

== Associations with other deities ==
Nirah was regarded as the messenger (šipru) of Ištaran, though not as his sukkal, as this role instead belonged to the god Qudma. Ištaran could also be regarded as Nirah's father. They usually appear together in god lists, and in one late commentary they are identified with each other. In a single case, Nirah is listed as a member of the court of Shamash rather than Ištaran. Most likely the first millennium BCE theologians from Sippar responsible for the composition of the inscription addressing him as such relied on the fact that his master was well known as a judge deity, similarly to Shamash.

Nirah could also be associated with various gods of the underworld, for example Ningishzida. In a single Old Babylonian god list Išḫara appears right after him, possibly due to their shared association with snakes.

In the myth Enki's Journey to Nippur, Nirah acts as the punting pole of the boat of the eponymous god.

No known source indicates that Nirah had a wife or children.

== Worship ==
Evidence for offerings dedicated to Nirah is relatively scarce, though it is presumed that he was worshiped at least in Der and Nippur. An inscription of Esarhaddon listing gods returned to Der confirms that Nirah was worshiped in this city. An earlier year formula of an unidentified king from the Diyala area mentions a throne and cella of Nirah, possibly also located in Der. In Nippur, Nirah could be regarded as one of the protective spirits (udug) or doormen (idu) of the Ekur temple.

Nirah appears in theophoric names from the Sargonic, Ur III, Isin-Larsa, Old Babylonian, Kassite and Middle Babylonian periods. For example, four names invoking Nirah are known from Kassite Nippur. It is also possible that the fourth king of the dynasty of Akshak known from the Sumerian King List bore the name Puzur-Nirah, though it has also been suggested that it should be instead read as Puzur-Irḫan. A single name from Achaemenid Ur might also invoke Nirah according to Frans Wiggermann. However, Paul-Alain Beaulieu is uncertain if the deity in mention, represented by the logographic writing ^{d}MUŠ, should be understood as Nirah or Irḫan. He tentatively transcribes the name in mention as Niraḫ-dān, "Nirah is powerful."
