= Gaṯaru =

Ugaritic and Mesopotamian god

- Member of Gaṯarāma/Gaṯarūma
- Other names: Gašru
- Major cult center: Ugarit, Opis

Gaṯaru (Ugaritic: gṯr) or Gašru (Akkadian: ^{d}gaš-ru, ^{d}ga-aš-ru) was a god worshiped in Ugarit, Emar and Mari in modern Syria, and in Opis in historical Babylonia in Iraq. While he is relatively sparsely attested, it is known that in Ugarit he was associated with the underworld, while in Mesopotamia he was understood as similar in character to Lugalirra or Erra.

The name and cognates of it could also be used as an epithet of other deities, meaning "strong" or "powerful." The Ugaritic texts also attest the existence of dual and plural forms, Gaṯarāma and Gaṯarūma, used to refer to Gaṯaru himself in association with other deities, such as the moon god Yarikh and the sun goddess Shapash.

== In Ugarit ==
The name of the god Gaṯaru (gṯr) is an ordinary Ugaritic adjective meaning "powerful," a cognate of Akkadian gašru, "strong." No further cognates are known from any other Semitic languages.

Gaṯaru was most likely associated with the underworld. Gregorio del Olmo Lete argues that he should be identified as a deceased royal ancestor, but according to Dennis Pardee this translation relied on a since disproved assumption that the phrase gṯr w yqr refers to a legendary founder of the Ugaritic ruling house. Connections with warfare and vegetation have been proposed for him as well. “

In one of the Ugaritic deity lists, Gaṯaru is most likely placed between Išḫara and Ashtart, though the tablet is damaged and his presence is only presumed. He appears between the same two goddesses in one of the offering lists, which states that he received a ram. Additionally, seven individuals bearing theophoric names invoking him are attested in known texts.

A trilingual Sumero-Hurro-Ugaritic edition of the Weidner god list from Ugarit equates Gaṯaru with Hurrian Milkunni and additionally with three Mesopotamian gods: Tishpak (line 27), Ningirsu (line 43) and Mesagunu (line 45). Other examples of the same Ugaritic and Hurrian deities corresponding to multiple Mesopotamian ones are present in the same text, and it is presumed that this practice was the result of the Ugaritic and Hurrian pantheons being smaller than the Mesopotamian one documented in scholarly god lists. It has been called into question if its results accurately reflect either Ugaritic or Hurrian theology.

=== As a dual or plural term ===
A term referring to a group of deities, Gaṯarāma or Gaṯarūma, is also attested. Dennis Pardee notes that the known texts do not seem to be consistent when it comes to their number: in some cases, the term is apparently grammatically dual and as such only refers to a pair, but elsewhere the number of the deities meant of is bigger, with the two restorations reflecting the first and second option respectively. One of the texts mentioning them states that during one of the Ugaritic festivals they had to enter the royal palace, where Gaṯaru himself subsequently received offerings of silver.

Based on the enumerations of individual offerings in rituals which use the plural term, Pardee argues that in various contexts the term might refer to Yarikh (the moon god) and Shapash (the sun goddess), Yarikh and Gašaru (in at least one case, the term denotes two deities both of whom were apparently male) or all three of these deities at once.

=== As an epithet ===
The word gṯr is attested in an epithet of the god Milku, ‘il gṯr w yqr, "powerful and august god." It is not considered plausible that it refers to Gaṯaru in this context.

In a single text, KTU^{2} 1.108, the war goddess Anat is also described as gṯr in a passage listing her various epithets. Aicha Rahmouni notes that the form gṯr is most likely a scribal mistake, and in accordance with the grammatical gender in Ugaritic suggests emending gṯr to its feminine form gṯrt. An alternative would be assuming that the word is treated as an abstract noun, "power," rather than as an adjective in this case, which is the solution preferred by Dennis Pardee, but no other attestations supporting such a translation are presently known.

== In inland Syria ==
Outside Ugarit, Gaṯaru is also attested in Emar, where his name was spelled in syllabic Akkadian cuneiform as ^{d}ga-aš-ru. No references to a temple or clergy dedicated to him are known, but he appears as an element in theophoric names. According to Paul-Alain Beaulieu he was also worshiped in Mari, where he is attested in a single theophoric name, Gašrum-gamil (^{d}ga-aš-rum-ga-mil). However, according to Piotr Steinkeller, unlike the Ugaritic texts, the sources from Emar and Mari do not provide direct evidence in favor of interpreting him as a god associated with the underworld.

== In Mesopotamia ==
There is evidence that in Mesopotamia a god analogous to Ugaritic Gaṯaru, Gašru (^{d}gaš-ru) was understood as analogous to Lugalirra or Erra. The equation is based on the similar meaning of Lugalirra's name: the element ir is treated as the Sumerian translation of gašru in lexical texts. However, the Akkadian god whose name had been directly translated into Sumerian language as "Lugalirra" was not Gašru, but rather Bēl-gašer (also romanized as Bēl-gašir), the tutelary deity of Shaduppum, known for example from a cylinder dedicated to him for the life of Ipiq-Adad II of Eshnunna.

Two Neo-Babylonian texts referring to a temple (É) of ^{d}gaš-ru indicate that Gašru was worshiped in Opis. They might come from the Eanna archive from Uruk, but this assumption about their origin remains uncertain.

=== As an epithet ===
The term gašru and its cognates are also attested as an element of epithets of various deities. Examples include the weather god Adad, the shepherd god Dumuzi (gašru massê lā šanān, "the strong, unrivaled leader"), and the war and love goddess Ishtar (lît ilī gašertum, "the most powerful among the gods, the strong one").
