= Gugalanna =

Husband of Ereshkigal in Sumerian mythology

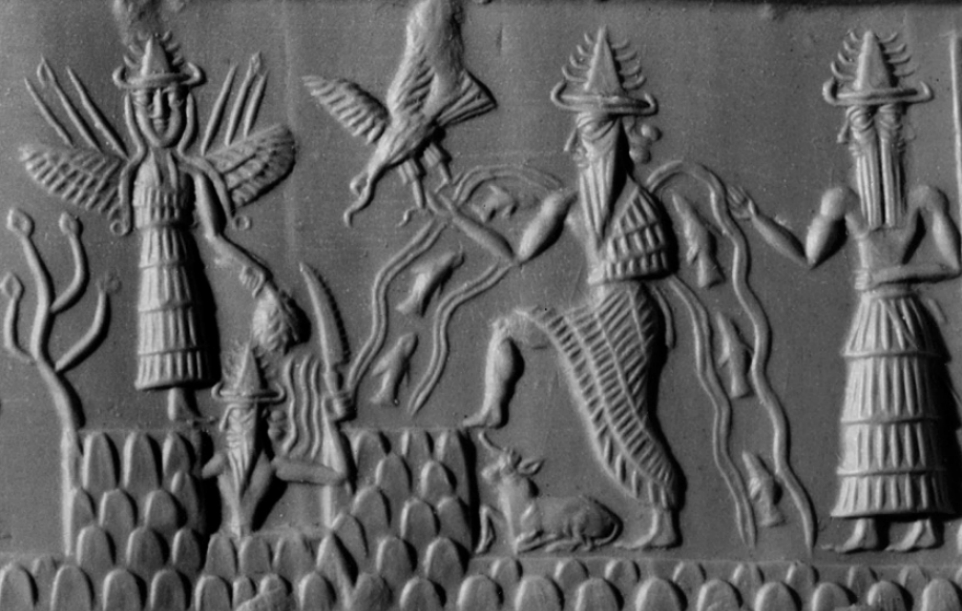
Seal of Adda depicting Inanna (left), Shamash (Center), and Enkidu (right)

In Sumerian religion, Gugalanna (𒄞𒃲𒀭𒈾 [GU_{4}.GAL.AN.NA] or 𒀭𒄘𒃲𒀭𒈾 [^{D}GU_{2}.GAL.AN.NA]) is the first husband of Ereshkigal, the queen of the underworld. His name probably originally meant "canal inspector of An" and he may be merely an alternative name for Ennugi. The son of Ereshkigal and Gugalanna is Ninazu. In Inanna's Descent into the Underworld, Inanna, the goddess of love, beauty, sex, and war, tells the gatekeeper Neti that she is descending to the Underworld to attend the funeral of "Gugalanna, the husband of my elder sister Ereshkigal". Some scholars consider Gugalanna to be the same figure as the Bull of Heaven, slain by Gilgamesh and Enkidu in the Epic of Gilgamesh.
