= Milku =

Ugaritic god

- God of the underworld
- Major cult center: Ugarit, ‘Aṯtartu, Hidra’yu

Equivalents
- Canaanite: Milcom
- Phoenician: Melqart
- Mesopotamian: Tishpak (according to a trilingual Ugaritic god list)

Milku was a god associated with the underworld who was worshiped in the kingdoms of Ugarit and Amurru in the late Bronze Age. It is possible that he originated further south, as Ugaritic texts indicate he was worshiped in cities located in the northern part of the Transjordan region. He was also incorporated into the Hurrian pantheon under the name Milkunni. There is also evidence that he was worshiped in Hittite religion. It is possible that a closely related deity is also known from Mesopotamia.

In the alphabetic script used in Ugarit, which does not always preserve vowels, Milku's name was written the same as the word malku, "king." As a result it is sometimes difficult to tell which of these two cognate words is meant. However, it is agreed that they were vocalized differently. It has been proposed that one of Milku's epithets was a pun referencing this writing convention.

== Name and character ==
The name of an underworld deity written as mlk in the Ugaritic alphabetic script is typically vocalized as Milku. Manfred Krebernik argues that the vocalization remains uncertain due to the large number of cognates in various Semitic languages, such as Akkadian and Hebrew, which can be used for comparative purposes. However, he considers Milku to be a plausible option based on the syllabic spelling of a Hurrian form of this deity, Milkunni. It is agreed that the name Milku was a cognate of the Ugaritic word malku, "king." Since the words are not identical, Krebernik suggests that the god originated outside the city, though also in an area where another northwest Semitic language was spoken. He notes that the use of a word referring to a king to an underworld deity has a parallel in the etymology of the name of the Mesopotamian god Nergal, the "lord of the great city."

Based on the etymology of Milku's name, Dennis Pardee goes as far as suggesting that in Ugarit he might have functioned as the divine king of the underworld. However, multiple other deities worshiped in this city were also associated with the underworld in addition to him: Resheph, Arsay and Allani. The Hurrian god Nupatik also appears in a single text in the role of a psychopomp. A further deity possibly associated with the underworld also attested in Ugarit was Shuwala. Less certain are the associations between Dagan and Horon and this sphere. Mot, "death," was also associated with the underworld, but was not actively worshiped as a deity, as evidenced by his absence from offering lists.

Milku was referred to as the "eternal king" (mlk ‘lm, malku ‘ālami). Pardee argues that this epithet might refer to the concept of "atemporality of the afterlife." It is additionally possible it was understood as a pun on Milku's name and the word malku. According to Aicha Rahmouni, there is no indication that epithets including the later word necessarily implied a deity was understood as a high ranking member of the pantheon. Milku was also called the "powerful and august god" (‘il gṯr w yqr). The term gṯr most likely functioned as the name of an independent deity in other contexts, but it is unlikely that the god Gaṯaru is meant in this passage. The view that yqr should instead be interpreted as the name of a king, Yaqaru (in the past also erroneously assumed to be the first king of the ruling dynasty of Ugarit known from historical records), is implausible according to Pardee. Rahmouni also considers it impossible that a proper name rather than an epithet is meant. Milku could also be called a hero (rp’u).

It is possible that Milku was sometimes described as a musician, presumably to indicate that at least the afterlife of kings, described in a text presumed to allude to such an activity, was considered joyful.

== Worship ==
Unambiguous evidence for the worship of Milku as a distinct deity is present in Ugaritic texts. He is one of the deities invoked in two incantations against snakebite, in which the sun goddess Shapash is asked to summon various deities from their cult centers. The location associated with him in these texts is ‘Aṯtartu. This place name is apparently with the name of a deity, Ashtart. It is assumed that it was located somewhere northwest of the Sea of Galilee, in the Transjordan. The Ugaritic texts invoking Milku from this city appear to reflect a cosmopolitan tradition, as multiple other deities are also invoked from locations outside the kingdom: Tuttul and Mari in Upper Mesopotamia, Larugatu in central Syria, Bibbita in Anatolia, and Caphtor, corresponding to Crete. An echo of this association between Milku and the city of ‘Aṯtartu might be the deity Milkaštart, who is attested in Phoenician and Punic sources.

A second city associated with Milku in Ugaritic texts is Hidra’yu. It has been suggested that ‘Aṯtartu and Hidrayu correspond to the place names Aštarot and Edrei (modern Daraa), associated with biblical king Og of Bashan. In older literature, Hidra’yu was sometimes incorrectly understood as the name of a deity, but this interpretation is now considered grammatically impossible.

An administrative text from Ugarit mentions the preparation of barley for the horses of Milku and Resheph. It is possible these two gods appear together in it because of their shared association with the underworld.

While it is agreed that Milku appears in some theophoric names from Ugarit, it is sometimes difficult to tell when mlk designates the deity rather than the ordinary word "king." Six examples of theophoric name invoking Milku have been identified, while the word meant in further seventeen mlk names remains uncertain. For example, it has been suggested that the name of the well attested scribe Ilimilku meant "Milku is my god," but Dennis Pardee and Nicolas Wyatt assume that it is more likely that the ordinary word "king" is meant in this case, and the name should be translated as "El is king."

Milku was also worshiped in the kingdom of Amurru, where he most likely was one of the main deities. However, very little is known about the religious life of this area due to lack of any texts directly pertaining to it. Milku appears in a treaty of the local king Duppi-Teššup with the Hittite empire. He also most likely appears as the theophoric element in the name of queen Ahatmilku, a member of Amurru's ruling house who married Niqmepa, a king of Ugarit.

=== Hurrian and Hittite reception ===
Milku was also incorporated into Hurrian and Hittite religious beliefs.

A god named Milkunni occurs in a trilingual god list from Ugarit in the Hurrian column. He corresponds to the Ugaritic Gaṯaru and Mesopotamian Tishpak in it. His name is a combination of Milku and the Hurrian suffix -nni.

According to Piotr Taracha, Milku was introduced to a number of settlements in Hittite territories during the reign of Tudḫaliya IV. However, the dating of the texts attesting this is not certain and it is possible that they do not document a planned introduction of specific deities to Anatolia, making the date from which deities mentioned in them were worshiped there uncertain. Other foreign deities attested in similar contexts include Šauška of Nineveh, Adad of Assur, Ishtar of Babylon and Baluhassa, the Luwian form of the name of the Balikh River, which could also function as the name of a deity.

Among the Hittite settlements where Milku was worshiped were Pahhanta, Parmashapa, Sappitta, Sallunatassi, Gullanta and Sapagurwanta. Additionally, he is also attested in texts from Emar, where according to Gary Beckman he is exclusively present in rituals of Anatolian origin, most likely "irrelevant to the religious life of the indigenous population."

=== Possible Mesopotamian reception ===
In an offering list from the Ur III period, a deity named Malkum is attested alongside the goddess Ḫabūrītum. It has been proposed that this name refers to an underworld deity derived from Syrian Milku. However, Tonia Sharlach argues that it is not impossible that this god was a Mesopotamian deity in origin and simply belonged to a sparsely attested local pantheon. Manfred Krebernik assumes that the term is plural and refers to deceased ancestors. He points out that it appears in such a context in funerary rites from Old Babylonian Mari. References to plural mlkm and ^{d}MA.LIK^{meš} are also known from Ugarit.

A related deity, Malik (^{d}ma-lik) is also attested in the Weidner god list, in a single copy of the Nippur god list and in a later text describing various deities worshiped in Assur.
