= Ningirida =

Mesopotamian goddess, wife of Ninazu

- Major cult center: Enegi

Genealogy
- Spouse: Ninazu
- Children: Ningishzida

Ningirida was a Mesopotamian goddess regarded as the wife of Ninazu and mother of Ningishzida. Little is known about her character beyond her relation to these two gods.

== Name and character ==
The correct reading of Ningirida's name has been established based on the phonetic syllabic spelling from the Ur III period, ^{d}Nin-gi-ri-da. According to Wilfred G. Lambert, the element girid is a Sumerian noun referring to a type of hair clasp used by women, and therefore does not provide any information about her individual character beyond her gender. In the myth Enki and Ninhursag, the name is reinterpreted as "the lady born of nose", ^{d}Nin-kìri-e-tu, but this is agreed to only be a folk etymology.

Little is known about Ningirida's individual character beyond her associations with deities regarded as members of her family. Jeremy Black assumed that she was associated with the underworld. From the Ur III period onward, she appears alongside Ninazu. However, it is possible older attestations are available, as the deity ^{d}GÍRID known from the Early Dynastic period might correspond to later Ningirida. Theophoric names from Lagash from this period sometimes feature the element ^{d}GÍRID.KI, which might indicate that the name was derived from a real or mythical toponym, as the sign KI could function as a determinative designating place names.

An attested alternate name of the same goddess is Ninsiskurra.

== Associations with other deities ==
Ningirida was regarded as the wife of Ninazu. The relation between them is directly confirmed by the myth Enki and Ninhursag, as well as in a hymn to Ninazu (which addresses her as "Your wife, the young girl, the lovely woman, the lady"), the god list An = Anum, and the so-called Emesal Vocabulary (a lexical list). However, she is not attested in association with her husband's northern cult center, Eshnunna, which might indicate the tradition involving her was exclusive to the south.

Ningishzida was regarded as a son of Ningirida and Ninazu.

A single god list from the first millennium BCE equates Ningirida with the medicine goddess Gula. According to Thomas Richter, an association between her and another medicine goddess, Ninisina is attested in earlier periods.

No evidence exists in favor of the view that Ningirida was confused with Ningirima, despite the similarity between their names.

== Worship ==
Ningirida appears in offering lists from the Ur III period alongside Ninazu and Ningishzida. The myth Nanna-Suen's Journey to Nippur indicates Enegi was considered her main cult center. A single reference to her and Ninazu receiving offerings in Nippur is known as well. Furthermore, according to a document from Ur, she receives offerings alongside Ninazu, Ningishzida, Ninazimua and Alla.

The Canonical Temple List, dated to the Kassite period, mentions two temples of Ningirida, but both their locations and ceremonial Sumerian names are not preserved.

== Mythology ==
In the myth Enki and Ninhursag, Ningirida appears as one of the eight deities created by Ninhursag to relieve Enki of his pain, the other seven being Abu, Ninsikila (Meskilak), Ninkasi, Nanshe, Azimua, Ninti and Ensag (Inzak). Dina Katz notes this group of deities does not reflect a specific theological concept, and was merely selected for the sake of puns on names of body parts. The spellings used are unique and assign new meanings to the names. In the end, destiny is proclaimed for each of the deities, with Ningirida's lot being to marry Ninazu.

In Nanna-Suen's Journey to Nippur, Nigirida is one of the goddesses who try to convince Nanna-Suen, who is traveling to meet his parents (Enlil and Ninlil) to leave his cargo in her city instead of taking it to Nippur, but she fails. Her residence in this myth is Enegi.

A hymn to Ningishzida describes Ningirida breastfeeding him in his infancy. References to goddesses raising their children, and to the childhood of deities in general, are otherwise very rare in Mesopotamian literature. Another narrative focused on this god which also mentions his mother is Descent of Ningishzida to the Nether World. She bribes a demonic "constable" (gallu) escorting her son with silver, and instructs him to use an exorcistic formula to get Ereshkigal's permission to restore him to life.
