= Tishpak =

Mesopotamian god

- Warrior god associated with snakes
- Major cult center: Eshnunna
- Symbol: mushussu

Genealogy
- Consort: Kulla
- Children: Nanshak, Pappasanu, Me-SUḪUR, possibly Inshushinak and Ishtaran

Equivalents
- Sumerian: Ninazu
- Hurrian: Milkunni
- Ugaritic: Gaṯaru

Tishpak (Tišpak) was a Mesopotamian god associated with the ancient city Eshnunna and its sphere of influence, located in the Diyala area of Iraq. He was primarily a war deity, but he was also associated with snakes, including the mythical mushussu and bashmu, and with kingship.

Tishpak was of neither Sumerian nor Akkadian origin and displaced Eshnunna's original tutelary god, Ninazu. Their iconography and character were similar, though they were not formally regarded as identical in most Mesopotamian sources.

== Origin ==
It is commonly assumed that initially the tutelary deity of Eshnunna was Ninazu, worshiped in the temple Esikil. From the Sargonic period onward, Tishpak competed with Ninazu in that location, and the latter finally ceased to be mentioned in documents from it after Hammurabi's conquest. While similar in character, Ninazu and Tishpak were not fully conflated, and unlike Inanna and Ishtar or Enki and Ea were kept apart in god lists.

It is generally agreed by scholars that Tishpak had neither Sumerian nor Akkadian origin. Fritz Hommel suggested in 1904 that he was analogous to the Hurrian weather god Teshub. This theory was also supported by Thorkild Jacobsen at first, though he later abandoned it and proposed that Tishpak's name had Akkadian origin, which is now regarded as implausible. Jacobsen’s second theory relied on the assumption that Tishpak's name, which he argued meant "downpour," would have similar meaning to an etymology he proposed for the name of Ninazu, "The Water-Pouring Lord," according to him an indication he was the god of spring rains. However, it is now agreed that Ninazu's name means "Lord Healer," and that he was considered a god of the underworld and vegetation and sometimes a divine warrior, not a weather deity. Elam has also been proposed as Tishpak's point of origin. Modern authors who support this view include Marten Stol, who considers it a possibility that Tishpak's name has Elamite origin, Manfred Krebernik, who also classifies the name of his son Nanshak as Elamite, and Irene Sibbing-Plantholt. In 1965 Dietz Otto Edzard combined both theories, arguing that Tishpak was an Elamite form of Teshub. Frans Wiggermann proposes that Tishpak was one of the deities he describes as "transtigridian snake gods," a group which he assumes developed on the boundary between Sumero-Akkadian and Elamite culture to which he also assigns gods such as Ninazu, Ningishzida, Ishtaran (the tutelary god of Der) and the Elamite Inshushinak (the tutelary god of Susa). In the god list An = Anum all of them appear in sequence, following Ereshkigal, which according to Wiggermann indicates they were regarded as underworld deities.

== Character and iconography ==
An inscription of king Dadusha of Eshnunna indicates that Tishpak was regarded as one of the major gods in this city's sphere of influence, as he occurs right after Anu, Enlil, Sin and Shamash, and before Adad. His character was similar to Ninazu's. He was a war god, described as "the warrior of the gods" (ursag ili). The incantation series Šurpu highlights this feature, calling him "lord of the troops" and placing him in a sequence with Ningirsu and Zababa, who were both regarded as warlike deities. An Akkadian text from Eshnunna additionally characterizes him as "steward of the sea" (abarak ti'āmtim) and "fierce hero" (qurādum ezzum).

Tishpak's attributes overlapped with these of Ninazu and included two maces and various snakes and serpentine monsters, especially the dragon mushussu. A year name from Eshnunna additionally indicates a bronze plough was one of the sacred objects held in his main temple. In the poorly preserved Labbu myth Tishpak's divine weapon is a seal, and he is described as capable of causing storms. It does not necessarily indicate he was a weather god, as Ninurta and Marduk, who had no such a role, also use atmospheric phenomena as weapons in myths. Such an interpretation was suggested in older studies, but is no longer accepted today.

Tishpak's name was represented logographically with the sign MUŠ, which could also designate other deities, for example Inshushinak.

On cylinder seals Tishpak could be depicted riding on a mushussu. References to visual representations of him "treading on a dragon" are also known from Mesopotamian texts. Additionally, while Mesopotamians generally imagined the gods as fully anthropomorphic, he was on occasion described as green in color, possibly indicating he was assumed to have snake-like skin. A scaled god occurs on seals from Eshnunna, but according to Frans Wiggermann he might be Ninazu rather than Tishpak. As noted by Theodore J. Lewis, art from Eshnunna, likely to depict Tishpak and monsters associated with him, is often incorrectly labeled as Canaanite even in professional publication, "bypassing any reference to Tishpak."

== Associations with other deities ==
Tishpak's wife was the goddess Kulla, known as the "Queen of Eshnunna." Much like in the case of her husband, the origin of her name is uncertain and a matter of scholarly debate. Their sons were Nanshak, Pappasanu and Me-SUḪUR (reading of the name uncertain). Marten Stol additionally assumes that Inshushinak and Ishtaran were regarded as sons of Tishpak by the compiler of the god list An = Anum. His sukkal was the serpentine creature bashmu. However, since on cylinder seals a god who might be Tishpak is accompanied by a fully anthropomorphic attendant deity, it is possible that Bashmu in this case was the name of an anthropomorphic minor god which was simply meant to highlight the association between his master and snakes. A further courtier of Tishpak was Abu, also known as Ipahum, "viper."

On the seal of Shu-Iliya, a king of Eshnunna, Tishpak appears alongside the goddesses Belet-Šuḫnir and Belet-Terraban. It is assumed that they had their origin north of Eshnunna, where the corresponding cities, Shuhnir and Terraban, were most likely located.

While Tishpak's epithet, "steward of the sea," is generally regarded as a sign that he was viewed as the enemy of a marine monster as described in the Labbu myth, Wilfred G. Lambert proposes that it might instead be a rare occurrence of Tiamat outside the Enuma Elish, rather than a mention of ordinary non-personified sea.

A Neo-Babylonian god list identifies Tishpak with Marduk, referring to him as "Marduk of the troops." Frans Wiggermann argues that the mushussu started to be associated with Marduk after Hammurabi's conquest of Eshnunna and suggests that it was a result of influence of the image of Tishpak on that of Marduk. Texts equating Tishpak with another god chiefly known from the official pantheon of Babylon, Nabu, are also known.

While most Mesopotamian sources do not treat Ninazu and Tishpak as equivalents, and they appear separately in the prologue of Laws of Hammurabi, a bilingual inscription from the reign of Shulgi of Ur lists Tishpak in the Akkadian version and Ninazu in Sumerian as the god worshiped in Esikil. Wilfred G. Lambert additionally proposed that Tishpak could be understood as a deity connected with Ninurta, based on his association with Ninazu, who shared many traits with the latter. Similarly, Andrew R. George argues that Tishpak's placement in the so-called Canonical Temple List might indicate he was one of the deities who could be syncretised with Ninurta, similar to Lugal-Marada, Zababa or Urash. According to Marten Stol, both classification of Tishpak as a Ninurta-like figure ("Ninurta-Gestalt") and direct equation between these two gods (Tishpak being described as Ninurta ša ramkūti) is attested in a single document each.

In an Ugaritic trilingual god list Tishpak is identified with Milkunni, a Hurro-Hittite god whose name was the combination of the Ugaritic divine name Milku with the Hurrian suffix -nni. The Ugaritic column of the same list (line 27) describes him as ga-ša-ru (Ugaritic: "mighty"; written as gṯr in the alphabetic script), an epithet treated as a divine name in this case which is applied within the same text to two more Mesopotamian deities whose names are not preserved. Aaron Tugendhaft, following earlier restoration proposals, concludes that they can be tentatively identified as Ningirsu (line 43) and Mesagunu (line 45), a minor warrior god from Uruk possibly associated with Nergal or Ninurta. The reading of his name continues to be disputed, and other proposals include Mes-sanga-unug, Messagunug, Pisangunuk and Pisansagunuga. Equating multiple Mesopotamian gods with the same Ugaritic and Hurrian ones in multilingual lists is well attested and is considered to be a result of scribes having to deal with the smaller number of deities present in these pantheons compared to these enumerated in Mesopotamian god lists. It has been suggested that in Ugarit gašaru might have referred to legendary ancestors of the royal family or to an underworld god. It is also attested as an epithet of the goddess Anat. The cognate Akkadian word, gašru, is attested in Emar as the name of a deity as well. In Mesopotamia, the god Gashru was usually associated with Lugalirra or Erra. Neo-Babylonian documents possibly originating in the Eanna archive from Uruk indicate he was worshiped under his own name in nearby Opis. The word gašru and its derivatives is also attested as the epithet or part of epithets of deities, for example Adad, Dumuzi, Ishtar and Ninurta (first attested during the reign of Tiglath-Pileser I).

== Worship ==
Tishpak was chiefly worshiped as the tutelary god of Eshnunna (Tell Asmar), first appearing there in the Sargonic period. His cult retained a degree of importance through most of the Old Babylonian period, much like his city. His main temple was the Esikil, "pure house," originally the temple of Ninazu. Only one reference to a festival of Tishpak, kinkum (the twelfth month of the calendar used in Eshnunna) isin Tishpak, is known.

After Eshnunna gained independence after the fall of Third Dynasty of Ur, a royal ideology in which the king was a representative of Tishpak developed. The human ruler of the city was described as an ensi, and Tishpak as its lugal. The latter was also referred to with epithets which in earlier periods belonged to Akkadian royal titularies. Beate Pongratz-Leisten compares it to the position of the god Ashur in his city Assur. One of the kings of Eshnunna was named Iquish-Tishpak. Bilalama and Dadusha called themselves "beloved of Tishpak" and most likely placed two statues of himself in his temple. Multiple year names of various rulers of the city mention Tishpak too.

According to Marten Stol, Tishpak was generally not worshiped outside the kingdom of Eshnunna. No references to active worship of him are known southern Mesopotamian cities.

Personal names with Tishpak as a theophoric names are known from Shaduppum (Tell Harmal), a city which was located within the borders of the kingdom of Eshnunna. Another site other than Eshnunna itself, though most likely affiliated with it, from which personal names with Tishpak as a theophoric element are known from is the Chogha Gavaneh site in western Iran, which in the early second millennium BCE was a predominantly Akkadian settlement. Kamyar Abdi and Gary Beckman note that the locally used calendar shows affinity with that known from sites in the Diyala area, and on this basis link it with Eshnunna. While the number of personal names invoking gods from the Diyala area, especially Tishpak (Ibni-Tishpak, Lipit-Tishpak, Tishpak-Gamil, Tishpak-nasi, Tishpak-iddinam, Warad-Tishpak), is higher in documents from Sippar than from any other place in Babylonia proper, the people bearing them were likely not native inhabitants of the city, but rather individuals who arrived from the kingdom of Eshnunna. There is evidence that Sippar was closely linked to Eshnunna, including economic texts, letters and the existence of greeting formulas invoking Shamash alongside Tishpak, rather than the tutelary god of nearby Babylon, Marduk.

Tishpak is also mentioned in a letter addressed by the official Shamash-nasir to the king Zimri-Lim of Mari, relaying an oracle of Terqa's tutelary god Dagan to him. The text was most likely an allegorical representation of Eshnunna’s encroachment of territory within the sphere of influence of Mari, with the mentioned gods - Dagan, Tishpak and the western goddess Ḫanat (whose words were relayed by the god Yakrub-El) - representing respectively Mari, Eshnunna and the Suhum area, which was under the control of Mari, but presumably endangered by the eastern kingdom's forces. While the text recognizes Tishpak as a high ranking god, it ultimately considers Dagan a higher authority.

In the prologue of Laws of Hammurabi, the eponymous king is addressed as "the one who brightens Tishpak's face." This section additionally mentions Ninazu, indicating it refers to Eshnunna, most likely showing that Hammurabi after his conquest of said city presented himself as fulfilling obligations associated with local gods to legitimize his rule.

A reference to Esikil occurs on a boundary stone (kudurru) of Nazi-Maruttash. Another Kassite period reference to Tishpak can be found in a curse formula from an inscription of either Kurigalzu I or Kurigalzu II from Der.

Tishpak appears in a ritual from the Utukku Lemnutu incantation series as one of the deities meant to protect a doorway, alongside the Sebitti, Lulal, Latarak, Mashtabba and Ishtar.

Two Neo-Assyrian ritual texts mention Tishpak: a tākultu from the reign of Ashurbanipal (alongside Ashur and Shakkan) and a list of deities worshiped in Assur (alongside Kittum).

== Mythology ==
One of the tablets from the library of Ashurbanipal narrates Tishpak's triumph over the monster Labbu, described as created by the sea, but designed by Enlil, seemingly to serve as punishment similar to the flood in the Atrahasis myth. Frans Wiggermann argues that the narrative shows a number of similarities to the myth of Anzu and to Enuma Elish. As pointed out by Wilfred G. Lambert, the most similar composition is however a fragmentary myth which seemingly casts Nergal as the hero, in which he confronts a sea monster on the behalf of Enlil. Frans Wiggermann proposes that the Labbu myth served as an explanation for Tishpak's associations with serpentine creatures such as mushussu, and as a justification for his installation as the tutelary god of Eshnunna. Lambert regards Wiggermann's theories about the myth as speculations due to the poor state of preservation of its only source making it impossible to interpret fully.
