= Kulla, Republic of Dagestan =

Kulla Кулла Куллаб
- Selo
- Location within Republic of Dagestan Location within Russia
- Coordinates: 42°18′N 46°54′E
- Country: Russia
- Region: Republic of Dagestan
- District: Gunibsky District
- Time zone: UTC+3:00

Kulla (Russian: Кулла; Avar: Куллаб) is a rural locality (a selo) in Batsadinsky Selsoviet, Gunibsky District, Republic of Dagestan, Russia. The population was 31 as of 2010.

== Geography ==
Kulla is located 19 km southwest of Gunib (the district's administrative centre) by road. Batsada and Shulani are the nearest rural localities.
