= Ninazu =

Mesopotamian underworld god

- God of the underworld, snakes and vegetation
- Major cult center: Enegi, originally also Eshnunna
- Symbol: snake

Genealogy
- Parents: Ereshkigal and Gugalanna; Enlil and Ninlil; Nanna; unnamed deities referred to as "mighty cow" and "untamable bull"
- Consort: Ningirida
- Children: Ningishzida; two daughters; Nintinugga

Equivalents
- Eshnunnean: Tishpak

Ninazu (Sumerian: 𒀭𒎏𒀀𒋢; [^{D}NIN.A.SU] "lord healer") was a Mesopotamian god of the underworld. He was also associated with snakes and vegetation, and with time acquired the character of a warrior god. He was frequently associated with Ereshkigal, either as a son, husband, or simply a member of the same category of underworld deities.

His original cult centers were Enegi and Eshnunna, though in the later city he was gradually replaced by a similar god, Tishpak. His cult declined after the Old Babylonian period, though in the city of Ur, where it was introduced from Enegi, he retained a number of worshipers even after the fall of the last Mesopotamian empires, in the Achaemenid period.

== Character and iconography ==
According to Julia M. Asher-Greve, Ninazu was initially considered a "high-ranking local god", similar in rank to Ningirsu. His name has Sumerian origin and can be translated as "lord healer", though he was rarely associated with medicine. It is nonetheless agreed that he could be considered a healing deity. He was regarded as the "king of the snakes" and as such was invoked in incantations against snakebite. Many of such texts were written in Elamite and Hurrian, rather than in Sumerian or Akkadian, even though they originated in Enegi. He was also associated with vegetation and agriculture.

It is possible that Ninazu was the oldest Sumerian god of the netherworld, and that he was only overshadowed by Ereshkigal and Nergal in later periods. He was referred to as a "steward of the great earth", "great earth" being a euphemism for the underworld, or as "lord of the underworld", though he shared this epithet shared with many deities, including his son Ningishzida, Nergal, Nirah and the primordial deity Enmesharra.

Ninazu was also regarded as a warrior deity, especially in Eshnunna. He was both described and possibly depicted as armed with two maces. While no artistic representations of him have been identified with certainty, his symbols mentioned in textual sources include snakes and the "snake-dragon" mushussu. In one of the Early Dynastic Zame Hymns he is also compared to a black dog, known from later Mesopotamian incantations and compendiums of omens as a symbol of death. "The Elam star", one of the Mesopotamian names of the planet Mars, was associated with Ninazu in astronomical texts.

== Associations with other deities ==
Multiple traditions regarding Ninazu's parentage existed. He was regarded either as a son of Ereshkigal and a "Great Lord" (possibly to be identified with Gugalanna, known from the god list An = Anum and from the myth Inanna's Descent to the Nether World), who might have been analogous to anonymous deities described as "mighty cow" and "untamable bull" attested as his parents elsewhere, of Enlil and Ninlil (an association originating in Eshnunna but present also in other sources, including the myth Enlil and Ninlil), or of Suen. Frans Wiggermann assumes that the genealogies where Ereshkigal is listed as his mother represent the original tradition, and making Ninazu a son of Enlil and Ninlil was the result of absorption of some features of Nergal. In an Early Dynastic text from Shuruppak the god of Enegi, presumably Ninazu, is already referred to as "Nergal of Enegi". The existence of a tradition in which Gula was Ninazu's mother, occasionally proposed in scholarship, should be considered baseless according to Andrew R. George.

The god Ninmada, called the "snake charmer of An," was consistently regarded as Ninazu's brother. In the myth How grain came to Sumer the brothers gift grain and flax to mankind. In the myth Enlil and Ninlil Ninazu's brothers are instead Nanna, Nergal and Enbilulu, though he retains a connection with agriculture there nonetheless.

In most sources the goddess Ningirida is listed as Ninazu's wife (a relation first attested in the Ur III period) but less commonly he could be the husband of Ukulla (normally the wife of Tishpak), and there are also instances where Ereshkigal is referred to as his wife rather than mother. The children of Ninazu and Ningirida were the god Ningishzida and his two sisters, in a single incantation he is also addressed as the father of the healing goddess Nintinugga. The names of the two daughters associated with Ningishzida vary between sources, with the best attested being Amashilama, known from a myth about the death of this god.

Ninazu has no sukkal (attendant deity) in the major god lists, but it is possible that the viper god Ippu (or Ipahum), later known as the sukkal of Ningishzida, originally was a courtier of his father instead. According to Irene Sibbing-Plantholt, he might be one and the same as the vegetation god Abu best known from the myth Enki and Ninhursag.

In the god list An = Anum Ninazu appears in a sequence including Ereshkigal, Ningishzida, Tishpak, Inshushinak and Ishtaran. Based on their association in god lists and similar attributes, Wiggermann proposes that these gods shared a similar origin somewhere in the "trans-Tigridian" area on the border between Mesopotamian and Elamite spheres of cultural influence.

A single god list from the first millennium BCE equates Ninazu with Ninurta, and his spouse Ningirida with Gula. An association between him and the latter goddess is also attested in the Gula Hymn of Bulluṭsa-rabi, composed at some point between 1400 BCE and 700 BCE (between the Kassite and Neo-Babylonian period). This text is considered an aretalogy and it might reflect the development of a form of henotheism in late theological traditions. As noted by Irene Sibbing-Plantholt, while it has been argued in the past that "this interpretation of Ninazu as a spouse of Gula goes back to the merge of Ninazu with Ninurta/Ningirsu (as son of Enlil and Ninlil), (...) this connection may also have been established through the link between (U)kulla(b), Ninazu’s spouse, and Gula." Frans Wiggermann notes that the hymn presents an "aberrant," otherwise unknown, genealogy of Ninazu, calling him "offspring of Mami," which according to him might entirely depend on implicit identification with Ninurta in this context. This god is addressed as "Mami's son" in the Anzû Myth (tablet II).

=== Outside Mesopotamia ===
A trilingual god list from Ugarit explains Ninazu as ši-ru-hi (meaning unknown) in the Hurrian column and possibly as il mutema (“god of death”) in Ugaritic.

== Worship ==
Ninazu's primary cult center was Enegi, a city located between Ur and Uruk. The association is first attested in an Early Dynastic document from Lagash. His main temple in that city was Egidda, "sealed house" or "storehouse". Offerings made to him in his cult center are mentioned in tablets from Puzrish-Dagan. Much like Ninazu himself, Enegi was associated with the underworld, and could be described as "pipe of Ereshkigal's quay" in literary texts in reference to a type of implement used in funerary libations. The cults of Enegi were likely influenced by Uruk, as in addition to Ninazu, typical Urukean deities like the messenger goddess Ninshubur, the demigod Gilgamesh and his mother Ninsun were venerated in this city.

A second cult center of Ninazu was Eshnunna, where his temple was the Esikil, "pure house". Frans Wiggermann maintains that the Ninazu of Eshnunna was identical with the Ninazu of Enegi. However, according to Irene Sibbing-Plantholt, it is uncertain if the latter was indeed identical, and thus a southern deity imported to a northern city, a different deity sharing the same name, or an epithet of a separate deity identical with the name of the god of Enegi. Starting in the Akkadian period, Ninazu apparently competed with the god Tishpak in Eshnunna, and ceased to be mentioned in documents from it altogether after Hammurabi's conquest. It is usually presumed that the later had foreign origin, and he might have been introduced to this city as early as in the late fourth and early third millennium BCE. While similar in character, Ninazu and Tishpak were not fully conflated, and unlike Inanna and Ishtar or Enki and Ea were kept apart in god lists.

In Lagash, Ninazu was one of the deities who were part of the official pantheon during the reign of Urukagina, but he is otherwise not attested there in the Early Dynastic period, with the exception of some theophoric personal names. Later Gudea built a temple dedicated to him, but its precise location and ceremonial name are not known.

From Enegi, Ninazu was also introduced to Ur, where his cult survived until late periods. A temple dedicated to him in this city was also named Egidda, and it has been proposed that it might have been where the center of his cult was relocated after the decline of Enegi suggested by its absence from records from the first millennium BCE. Other cities from which offerings to him are attested are Nippur, Umma and Adab. In the first millennium BCE, he was also venerated in Assur. Furthermore, the name of a temple dedicated to him, Ekurmaḫ, "house, exalted mountain," is known from the Epic of Anzû, but its location is unknown.

The last available evidence for cult of Ninazu are theophoric personal names from Ur invoking him, present in sources from the period of Persian rule over Mesopotamia. According to Paul-Alain Beaulieu, he must have remained a relatively popular deity in Ur. A peculiarity associated with the late worship of Ninazu in Ur is the use of both the basic form of his name and its Emesal equivalent, Umunazu, in personal names, with the latter being slightly more common - 25 names with Ninazu and 30 with Umunazu are presently known. It is possible that this situation was influenced by the role played by lamentation priests, who traditionally memorized texts written in the Emesal dialect, in the survival of Ninazu's cult. Other underworld deities, like his son Ningishzida, the deified snake Nirah and the incantation goddess Ningirima, also retained a degree of popularity, likely due to being envisioned as members of Ninazu's court.
