= Mušḫuššu =

Dragon-like creature from Mesopotamian mythology

Mušḫuššu 𒈲𒍽
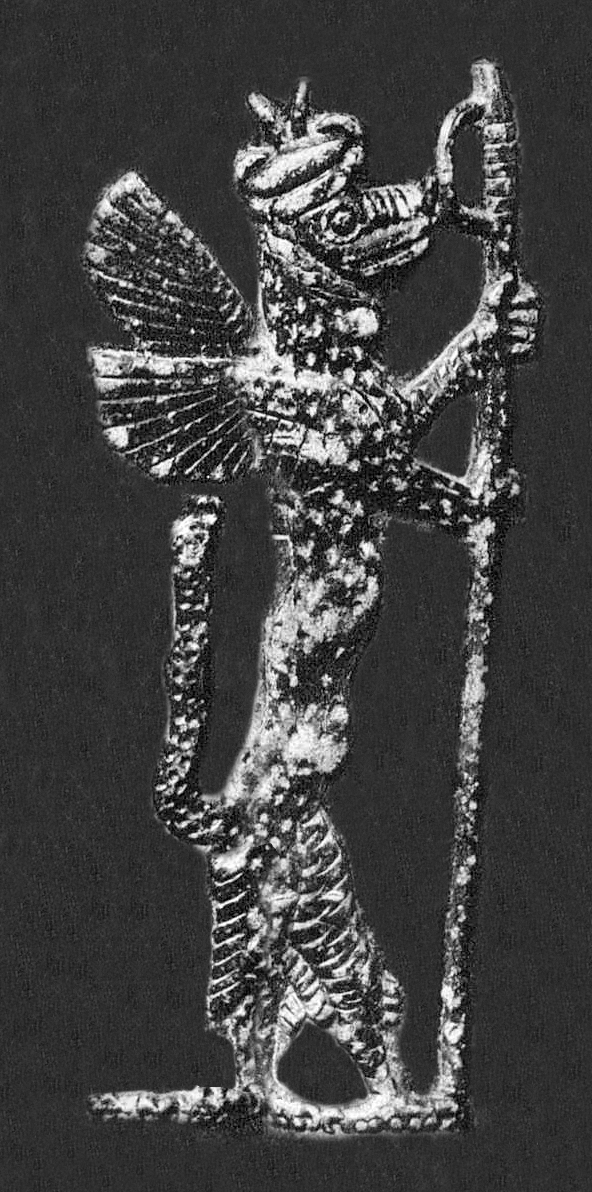
- Mušḫuššu holding a gate post on a vase of Gudea c. 2100 BCE. Louvre Museum

Creature information
- Other name: Sirrush
- Grouping: Mythological hybrid
- Folklore: Babylonian mythology

Origin
- Region: Mesopotamia

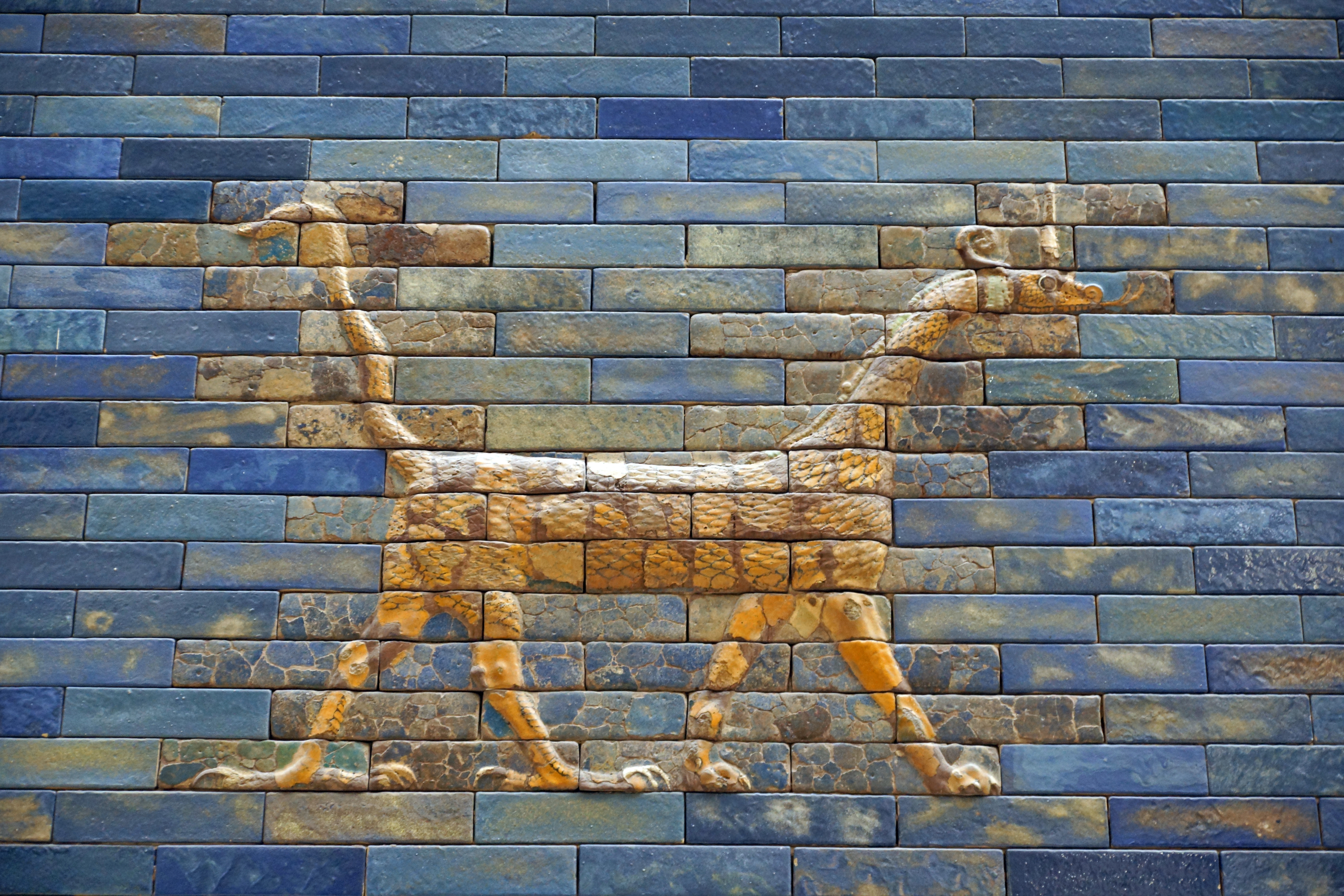
Mušḫuššu bas-relief in the Pergamon Museum

The mušḫuššu (𒈲𒍽; formerly also read as sirrušu or sirrush) or mushkhushshu (Akkadian pronunciation: [muʃˈχuʃ.ʃum]) is a creature from ancient Mesopotamian mythology. A mythological hybrid, it is a scaly animal with hind legs resembling the talons of an eagle, lion-like forelimbs, a long neck and tail, two horns on its head, a snake-like tongue, and a crest. The mušḫuššu most famously appears on the Ishtar Gate of the city of Babylon, dating to the sixth century BCE.

The form mušḫuššu is the Akkadian nominative of Sumerian: 𒈲𒍽 MUŠ.ḪUŠ, 'reddish snake', sometimes also translated as 'fierce snake'. One author, possibly following others, translates it as 'splendour serpent' (𒈲 MUŠ is the Sumerian term for 'serpent'). The older reading sir-ruššu is due to a mistransliteration of the cuneiform in early Assyriology and was often used as a placeholder before the actual reading was discovered.

== History ==
Mušḫuššu already appears in Sumerian religion and art, as in the "Libation vase of Gudea", dedicated to Ningishzida by the Sumerian ruler Gudea (21st century BCE short chronology).

The mušḫuššu was the sacred animal of Marduk and his son Nabu during the Neo-Babylonian Empire. The dragon Mušḫuššu, whom Marduk once vanquished, became his symbolic animal and servant. It was taken over by Marduk from Tishpak, the local god of Eshnunna.

The constellation Hydra was known in Babylonian astronomical texts as Bašmu, 'the Serpent' (𒀯𒈲, ^{MUL.d}MUŠ). It was depicted as having the torso of a fish, the tail of a snake, the forepaws of a lion, the hind legs of an eagle, wings, and a head comparable to the mušḫuššu.

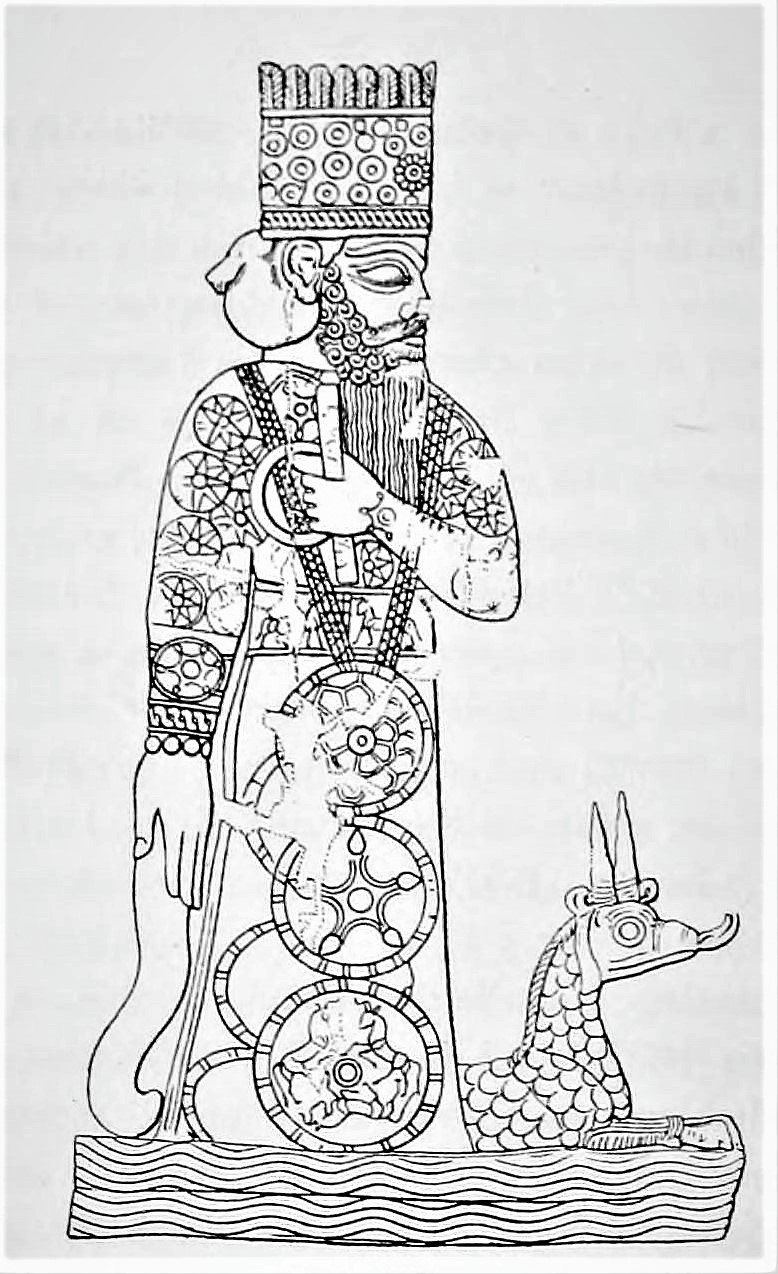
9th century BCE depiction of the Statue of Marduk, with his servant dragon Mušḫuššu at his feet. This was Marduk's main cult image in Babylon.

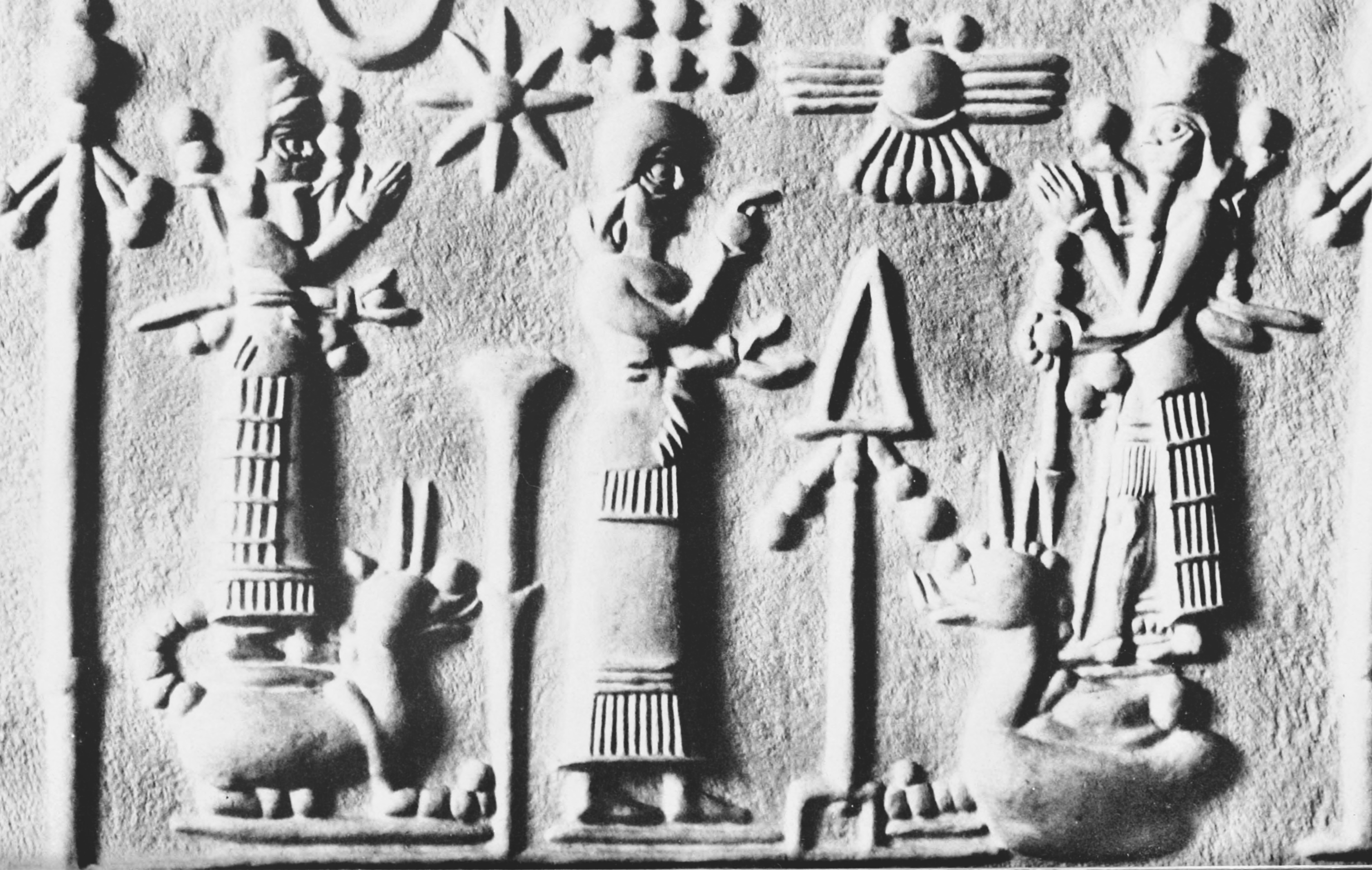
Late Assyrian seal from the 8th century BCE showing a worshipper between Nabu and Marduk, standing on their servant dragon Mušḫuššu.

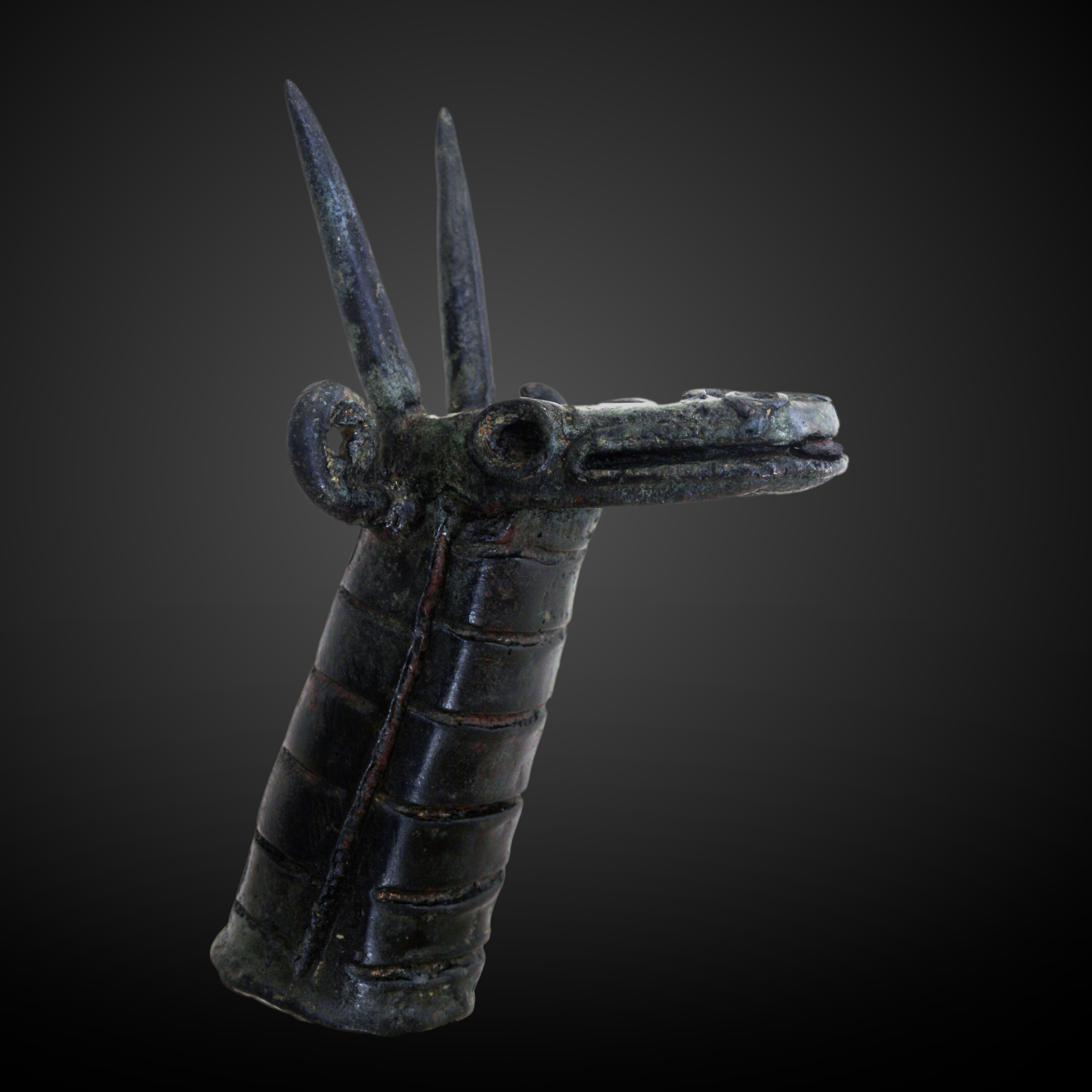
Head of dragon dating from the Neo-Babylonian Empire (626 BCE – 539 BCE) from the Louvre Museum's collection

== See also ==
- Ningishzida
- Set animal

== Notes ==
1. Similar to the Set animal in Egyptian mythology and the Qilin in Chinese mythology.
