= Ninurima =

Mesopotamian goddess

- Major cult center: Ur

Genealogy
- Spouse: Alammuš

Ninurima was a Mesopotamian goddess regarded as the spouse of Alammuš, an attendant of the moon god Nanna. She is best attested in texts from the Ur III period from Ur, though she also occurs in a number of god lists, including An = Anum.

== Character ==
Ninurima, the "lady of Ur", was regarded as the spouse of Alammuš, the divine attendant (sukkal) of the moon god Nanna. The nature of the connection between them is confirmed by the god list An = Anum, where she occurs in line 38 of tablet III, before Ningal's sukkal Meme. The pair Ninurima and Alammuš could also appear in association with Ninpumuna, the goddess of salt springs.

== Worship ==
While Ninurima is already present in an Early Dynastic god list from Fara, her cult is best attested in the Ur III period. She belonged to the group of deities worshiped in Ur, which at this time also included, among others, Nanna, Ningal, Ninkununa, Ningublaga, Nineigara, Ninsun, Gula, Annunitum and Ulmašītum.

A foundation tablet of Shulgi commemorates the construction of a temple dedicated to her in Karzida (Ga’eš). It presumably belonged to the complex of the local temple of Nanna. Andrew R. George maintains that since this settlement was a cult center of the moon god, it can be assumed that the deity meant was understood as a manifestation of Ningal as the "Lady of Ur," Nin-Urimma

Offerings to Ninurima are recorded in texts from Ur, though they do not occur as commonly as these made to the lead deities of the city, Nanna and Ningal. She is listed a recipient of "pure" (lú-tu_{5}-a) flour. In a single case, she received a sacrifice alongside Alammuš.

A single theophoric name invoking Ninurima, Geme-Ninurima, has been identified in the corpus of texts from the Ur III period. She is also attested in An = Anum, in an Old Babylonian god list where her name is apparently a scribal error and Ninirigal was likely meant, and in a school exercise from Susa.
