= Ninpumuna =

Mesopotamian goddess

- Goddess of salt springs
- Major cult center: Ur, Puzrish-Dagan, possibly Gishbanda

Ninpumuna was a Mesopotamian goddess associated with salt springs. It is assumed she was also an underworld deity. She is only attested in a handful of texts from the Ur III period from Ur and Puzrish-Dagan, in which she can appear alongside deities such as Ninazu and Ningishzida. It has been proposed she was also worshiped in the cult center of the latter god, Gishbanda.

== Character ==
Ninpumuna's name can be translated from Sumerian as "mistress of the salt spring." The term pu_{3}-mun, "salt spring," is first attested in a document from the Early Dynastic period. The theonym is rendered as ^{d}Nin-TÚL-mun-na in the Reallexikon der Assyriologie und Vorderasiatischen Archäologie, but more recent publications by Dina Katz (2007), Annabelle Staiger (2010) and Jose Hernández (2013) consistently use the reading "Ninpumuna." Mark E. Cohen already referred to her as "Ninpumunna" in a monograph published in 1993.

It is presumed that Ninpumuna was associated with the underworld. Possibly the type of springs she was associated with was perceived as a symbol of death. However, Steiger notes that future studies of her character will need to take into account that salt also had positive associations in Mesopotamian culture, chiefly as a valuable ware or as an agent of ritual purification.

== Worship ==
The only known texts which mention Ninpumuna come from Ur and Puzrish-Dagan. All have been dated to roughly the same forty years old section of the Ur III period, and most were specifically written during the reigns of kings Amar-Sin and Ibbi-Sin.

In a text from the latter of these two sites, a priestess of Meslamtaea is stated to be responsible for offering sheep to Ninpumuna. However, she also had her own clergy, as evidenced by the fact that a "saĝĝa of Ninpumuna" appears in a document from the same location dealing with deliveries for Usaga, a possible member of the royal family, and to an Amorite named Naplānum. The term saĝĝa can be translated as "temple administrator." One ceremony involving Ninpumuna took place in a temple of Ninsun, and apparently was overseen by the reigning king at the time, Shu-Sin. She also appears in the fourth ritual from a series pertaining to funerary rites of the same monarch which has been discovered in Puzrish-Dagan. According to this text, she received an offering of sacrificial animals alongside deities such as Ninshubur, Bau, Belet-Šuḫnir, Haya, various manifestations of Inanna, Shamash, Meslamtaea, Geshtinanna, Allatum, Gilgamesh, the underworld gatekeeper Bitu, the deified king Amar-Sin, and others. The order in which they are arranged might be random.

In Ur Nipumuna appears in two offering lists, in both of which she receives offerings alongside Ninazu, and in one also and Ningirida, Ningishzida, Ninazimua, Alla and a deity whose name is not fully preserved. Similar associations between her and underworld deities are commonly attested in other available sources. She is also attested in association with Alammuš and Ninurima. Based on her connection to Ningishzida, Annabelle Steiger suggests that she might have been worshiped in his cult center, Gishbanda.
