= Kalkal (god) =

Mesopotamian god

- Divine doorkeeper of the Ekur
- Major cult center: Nippur

Genealogy
- Spouse: Nimintabba

Kalkal was a Mesopotamian god regarded as a divine doorkeeper. He was associated with the Ekur, the temple of Enlil in Nippur. He is attested in sources from this city from multiple periods, including offering lists from the Ur III period, an Old Babylonian god list, and the Neo-Babylonian Nippur Compendium. He was also worshiped in Maškan, where a temple dedicated to him existed in the Ur III period, as well as in Assur, as first attested in Middle Assyrian sources. He is also attested in a number of literary texts, such as the myth Nanna-Suen's Journey to Nippur and the lament Enamani Ilu Ilu.

== Name and character ==
The theonym Kalkal was written in cuneiform as ^{d}kal-kal or ^{d}ka-al-ka-al, with the determinative sometimes omitted. Despite phonetic similarity it is not related to the theonym Kakka. According to the god list An = Anum (tablet I, line 269) he was also known as Egaldibba (^{d}e_{2}-gal-dib-ba).

Kalkal was regarded as a divine doorkeeper. He was believed to fulfill this role in the Ekur, the temple of Enlil in Nippur. He is directly described as the "chief doorkeeper of Ekur" (i_{3}-du_{8} gal e_{2}-kur-ra-ke_{4}) in An = Anum (tablet I, line 268). This role could be less commonly attributed to Enlil's sukkal Nuska, who could be regarded as Kalkal's superior.

According to An = Anum (tablet I, line 270) the goddess Nimintabba was considered Kalkal's wife. Antoine Cavigneaux and Manfred Krebernik suggest that she might also have been associated with doors.

== Worship ==
Kalkal is attested in various genres of religious texts from between the Ur III and Late Babylonian periods.

In the Ur III period he received offerings in the Ekur in Nippur alongside the "gate of Enlil", presumably the entrance to this temple complex. He also appears in the Old Babylonian Nippur god list. According to the Nippur Compendium, a text dealing with religious interpretation of the name of this city and its various religious landmarks known from Neo-Babylonian and Late Babylonian copies, he was also worshiped in the local temple of Sin alongside Sin himself, his wife Ningal, their children Ishtar and Shamash, and Shuzianna.

A temple of Kalkal existed in Maškan, a town located in the proximity of Umma most likely founded under the reign of the Third Dynasty of Ur. It is attested in multiple texts from this period, including a list of religious personnel in the service of Kalkal, Nergal and the deified king Shulgi.

In the Middle Assyrian and Neo-Assyrian periods Kalkal was worshiped in Assur in Assyria. He is mentioned in a text conventionally referred to as Götteradressbuch or Divine Directory from Aššur, a Neo-Assyrian list of temples located in this city and deities worshiped in them. Furthermore, both Kalkal and images representing him are mentioned in the tākultu from the reign of Sennacherib. Additionally, a gate linking two of the courtyards of the temple of Ashur was known as the Kalkal gate.

Multiple theophoric names invoking Kalkal are known. For example, an individual named Lu-Kalkal appears in a text from Girsu from the Ur III period.

== Mythology ==
In the myth Nanna-Suen's Journey to Nippur, after arriving in Nippur the eponymous god implores Kalkal to open the gates of the temple of Enlil for him so that he can present gifts he brought. He receives items stored at the prow and stern of the boat as gifts. According to Aino Hätinen, the inclusion of Kalkal among the deities worshiped in the temple of Sin in Nippur reflects his role in this composition.

The preserved section of the lament Enemani Ilu Ilu describes Kalkal's attempt to prevent Inanna from entering the Ekur because he believes she did not undergo procedures necessary to be granted an audience with Enlil. Inanna nonetheless continues to plead, and her words eventually reach Enlil, who orders Kalkal to open the door he guards and let her in; the rest of the text is not preserved.

In Atrahasis, Kalkal is the first of Enlil's servants to notice the laborer gods have surrounded his temple and want to battle him; he wakes up Nuska, who observes the events taking place outside with him, and subsequently wakes up Enlil. According to Frans Wiggermann, it can be argued that in this context Nuska is portrayed as Kalkal's superior.

A fragmentary, presently unpublished Old Babylonian Emesal composition mentions Kalkal in an unknown context alongside king Enlil-bani.
