= Sin (mythology) =

Mesopotamian lunar god

- God of the Moon
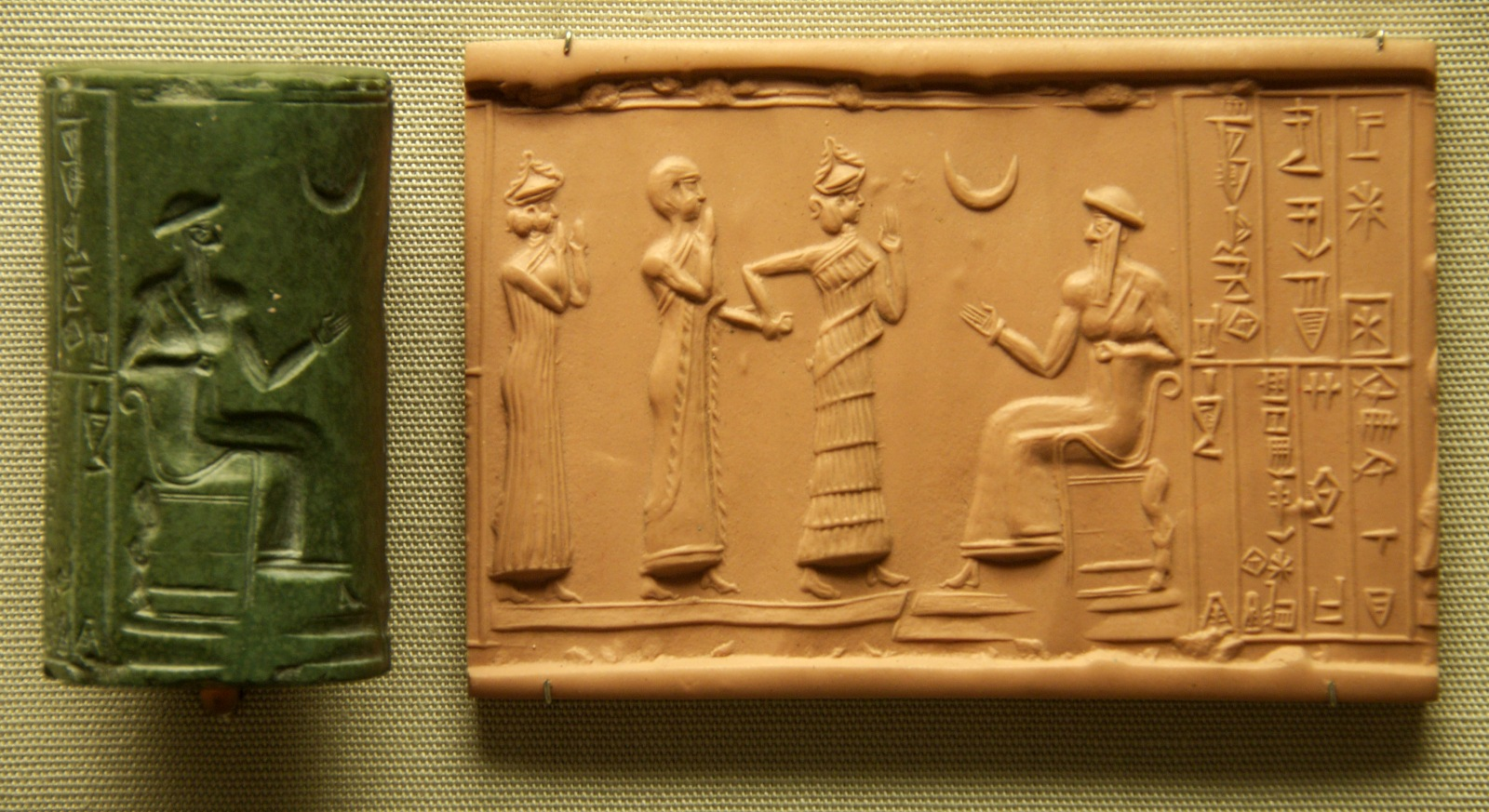
- Impression of the cylinder seal of Ḫašḫamer, ensi (governor) of Iškun-Sin c. 2100 BCE. The seated figure is probably king Ur-Nammu, bestowing the governorship on Ḫašḫamer, who is led before him by Lamma (protective goddess). Sin himself is indicated in the form of a crescent.
- Other names: Nanna, Nanna-Suen, Dilimbabbar
- Major cult center: Ur, Harran, Tutub
- Planet: Moon
- Animals: bull
- Symbol: Crescent
- Number: 30
- Mount: lunar barge
- Temples: Ekišnugal, Eḫulḫul

Genealogy
- Parents: Enlil and Ninlil
- Siblings: Nergal, Ninazu, Enbilulu
- Spouse: Ningal
- Children: Inanna/Ishtar, Utu/Shamash, Ningublaga, Numushda, Amarazu, Amaraḫea, Nuska

Equivalents
- Hurrian: Kušuḫ
- Ugaritic: Yarikh
- Hittite and Luwian: Arma
- Hattian: Kašku
- Mandaean: Sin

Sin (/ˈsiːn/) or Suen (Akkadian: 𒀭𒂗𒍪, ^{d}EN.ZU) also known as Nanna (Sumerian: 𒀭𒋀𒆠 ^{D}ŠEŠ.KI, ^{D}NANNA) is the Mesopotamian god representing the moon. While these two names originate in two different languages, respectively Akkadian and Sumerian, they were already used interchangeably to refer to one deity in the Early Dynastic period. They were sometimes combined into the double name Nanna-Suen. A third well attested name is Dilimbabbar (𒀭𒀸𒁽𒌓). Additionally, the name of the moon god could be represented by logograms reflecting his lunar character, such as ^{d}30 (𒀭𒌍), referring to days in the lunar month or ^{d}U_{4}.SAKAR (𒀭𒌓𒊬), derived from a term referring to the crescent. In addition to his astral role, Sin was also closely associated with cattle herding. Furthermore, there is some evidence that he could serve as a judge of the dead in the underworld. A distinct tradition in which he was regarded either as a god of equal status as the usual heads of the Mesopotamian pantheon, Enlil and Anu, or as a king of the gods in his own right, is also attested, though it only had limited recognition. In Mesopotamian art, his symbol was the crescent. When depicted anthropomorphically, he typically either wore headwear decorated with it or held a staff topped with it, though on kudurru the crescent alone serves as a representation of him. He was also associated with boats.

The goddess Ningal was regarded as Sin's wife. Their best attested children are Inanna (Ishtar) and Utu (Shamash), though other deities, for example Ningublaga or Numushda, could be regarded as members of their family too. Sin was also believed to have an attendant deity (sukkal), Alammuš, and various courtiers, such as Nineigara, Ninurima and Nimintabba. He was also associated with other lunar gods, such as Hurrian Kušuḫ or Ugaritic Yarikh.

The main cult center of Sin was Ur. He was already associated with this city in the Early Dynastic period, and was recognized as its tutelary deity and divine ruler. His temple located there was known under the ceremonial name Ekišnugal, and through its history it was rebuilt by multiple Mesopotamian rulers. Ur was also the residence of the en priestesses of Nanna, the most famous of whom was Enheduanna. Furthermore, from the Old Babylonian period onward he was also closely associated with Harran. The importance of this city as his cult center grew in the first millennium BCE, as reflected in Neo-Hittite, Neo-Assyrian and Neo-Babylonian sources. Sin's temple survived in later periods as well, under Achaemenid, Seleucid and Roman rule. Sin was also worshiped in many other cities in Mesopotamia. Temples dedicated to him existed for example in Tutub, which early on was considered another of his major cult centers, as well as in Urum, Babylon, Uruk, Nippur and Assur. The extent to which beliefs pertaining to him influenced the Harranian Sabians, a religious community who lived in Harran after the Muslim conquest of the Levant, is disputed.

== Names ==
While it is agreed that the two primary names of the Mesopotamian moon god, Nanna and Sin (Suen), originated in two different languages, respectively Sumerian and Akkadian, it is not possible to differentiate between them as designations of separate deities, as they effectively fully merged at an early date. Gebhard J. Selz points out this phenomenon is already attested in sources from Lagash from the Early Dynastic period, where the name Nanna does not appear, and Sin is the form used in both Sumerian and Akkadian context. The process of conflation presumably started prior to the invention of cuneiform. Sometimes the double name Nanna-Suen was used, as evidenced for example by a short theological text from the Ur III period listing the main deities of the official pantheon. It is sometimes used to refer to this god in modern Assyriological publications too.

=== Nanna ===
The precise etymology of the name Nanna is unknown, though it is agreed that it is not a genitive construction. It is first attested in the Uruk period. In earliest cuneiform texts from Uruk and Ur it was written as ^{(d)}LAK-32.NA, with NA possibly serving as a phonetic complement. The name of the city of Ur (Urim) was accordingly written as LAK-32.UNUG^{ki} (𒋀𒀕𒆠), "residence of Nanna", per analogy with toponyms such as Zabalam, INANNA.UNUG^{ki}. In later periods LAK-32 coalesced with ŠEŠ (the ideogram for "brother"), and Nanna's name came to be written as ^{d}ŠEŠ+KI or ^{d}ŠEŠ.KI, though phonetic spellings such as na-an-na are attested too, for example as glosses in lexical lists.

In early Assyriological scholarship it was often assumed that the variant form Nannar was the standard form of the name, but further research demonstrated that it does not predate the Old Babylonian period. The writing ^{d}na-an-na-ar is attested in Akkadian and Elamite texts, and was the result of linguistic contamination between the theonym Nanna and the common Akkadian noun nannaru, "light". As an epithet, nannaru could be used to address the moon god, but also Ishtar and Girra.

It is uncertain if the theonym Nanum attested in a theophoric name from Umma is a derivative of Nanna, while Nanni worshiped in Mari and in the Ḫana was a female deity and might be related to Nanaya rather than the moon god.

=== Sin ===
In Akkadian the moon god was called Sin (Sîn) or Suen (Su’en). The former is the standard reading of the name from the Old Babylonian period onward, while the latter was presumably the older uncontracted pronunciation. The etymology of this name remains uncertain. One of the inscriptions of Gudea from the third millennium BCE refers to Sin as a god "whose name nobody can explain", which might be an indication that his name was already unclear and a subject of scribal speculation during his reign.

The name Sin was typically written in cuneiform as ^{d}EN.ZU, as possibly already attested in a text from the Uruk period, though oldest certain examples, such as entries in the god lists from Fara and Abu Salabikh, only date back to the Early Dynastic period. Most likely it initially developed as a rebus meant to graphically resemble the names of gods whose names had Sumerian etymologies and contained the element EN, for example Enlil. Various phonetic spellings are also attested, for example sú-en, sí-in, si-in and se-en. The large variety of these variants might indicate that the first sibilant was difficult to render in cuneiform. In early Akkadian, the sound /s/ was an affricate [ts], which would explain its initial representation with Z-signs and later with S-signs.

A variant form of Sin's name, Suinu, is also attested in texts from Ebla. It has been pointed out that an Eblaite lexical list with the entry sú-i-nu is the oldest available attestation of a phonetic spelling of the name. However, the logogram ^{d}EN.ZU was also used in this city. Additionally, in a translation of an Akkadian text written in the Ugaritic alphabetic script the name is rendered as sn (KTU 1.70, line 4), while in Aramaic the variants sn, syn and šn are attested. In the Masoretic Text of the Hebrew Bible Sin's name is rendered as san in the theophoric names Sennacherib (Sîn-aḫḫe-erība) and Sanballat (Sîn-uballiṭ). Alfonso Archi argues that the theonym syn attested in a number of inscriptions from South Arabia should be interpreted as a variant of Sin's name too, and suggests vocalizing it similarly to the Eblaite form of the name. However, Manfred Krebernik concludes that no certain cognates of Sin's name have been identified in other Semitic languages, and syn (or sn), who according to him is only known from Thamudic inscription from Hadhramaut, should instead be interpreted as Sayin, the local sun god.

From the Old Babylonian period onward Sin's name could be represented by the logogram ^{d}30 (𒀭𒌍), derived from the cuneiform numeral 30, symbolically associated with him due to the number of days in the lunar month. It was originally assumed that an even earlier example occurs in the writing of a personal name from the Ur III period, but subsequent research demonstrated that this was the result of erroneous collation. In the first millennium BCE ^{d}30 became the most common writing. For example, in the text corpus from Neo-Babylonian Uruk only a single text, a kudurru inscription of Ibni-Ishtar, uses ^{d}EN.ZU instead of ^{d}30. Uncommonly ^{d}NANNA was used in Akkadian texts as a sumerogram meant to be read as Sin.

=== Dilimbabbar ===
Next to Sin and Nanna, the best attested name of the moon god is ^{d}AŠ-im_{4}-babbar (𒀭𒀸𒁽𒌓). It was originally assumed that it should be read as Ašimbabbar, though it was subsequently proved that this depended on an erroneous collation. By 2016 the consensus view that Dilimbabbar is the correct reading was established based on the discovery of multiple passages providing phonetic syllabic spellings. The name can be translated as "the shining one who walks alone". This meaning was originally established based on the now abandoned reading of the name, but it is still considered a valid translation. An alternate proposal relying on homophony of the element dilim and the logogram dilim_{2} (LIŠ) is to explain Dilimbabbar as "the shining bowl". The term dilim_{2} was a loan from Akkadian tilimtu, "bowl". Piotr Steinkeller notes that it is not impossible both proposals regarding the meaning of Dilimbabbar are correct, and that the scribes might have intentionally created puns depending on the well attested tradition of referring to the moon as a unique or solitary celestial body.

Dilimbabbar is already attested in the Early Dynastic god list from Abu Salabikh. The Zame Hymns from the same period link this title with the worship of the moon god in Urum (Tell Uqair). It is not certain if at this point in time it was understood as a title of Sin or as the name of a distinct deity of analogous character. Mark Glenn Hall notes that the absence of theophoric names invoking the moon god under this name from available sources might indicate that if Dilimbabbar was ever understood as a distinct deity this tradition disappeared very early on. However, Manfred Krebernik and Jan Lisman point out that in the Temple Hymns (hymn 37) Dilimbabbar is addressed as a shepherd of Sin, which they argue might be a relic of an intermediate stage between the existence of two independent moon gods and their full conflation.

For unknown reasons the name Dilimbabbar is absent from all the other known Early Dynastic sources, as well as these from the subsequent Sargonic and Ur III periods, with the next oldest attestation being identified in an inscription of Nur-Adad of Larsa from Ur from the Isin-Larsa period, which might reflect a rediscovery of the name by scribes under hitherto unknown circumstances. It remained in use through subsequent periods, down to the first millennium BCE.

The Akkadian epithet Namraṣit was considered analogous to Dilimbabbar, as attested in the god list An = Anum (tablet III, line 26). It can be translated as "whose rise is luminous". Steinkeller points out that it is not a direct translation of Dilimbabbar, as it effectively leaves out the element dilim. Bendt Alster assumed that the equivalence was the result of late reinterpretation.

== Character ==
Sin was understood both as an anthropomorphic deity representing the moon, and as the astral body itself. He was responsible for providing light during the night. His luminous character could be highlighted with epithets such as "the luminary of the heavens and earth" (nannār šamê u erṣeti) or "the luminary of all creation" (nannār kullati binīti). The growth of the moon over the course of the month was reflected in comparing Sin to the growth of fruit (Akkadian inbu, Sumerian gurun) as attested in Neo-Assyrian and Neo-Babylonian sources, especially hemerologies. However, it was not applied consistently as a designation for a specific phase of the moon. Lunar eclipses were believed to be the result of Sin being surrounded by seven evil utukku sent by Anu.

Next to his astral aspect, Sin's other main role has been described as that of a pastoral deity. He was associated with cattle and with dairy products. This link is reflected in his secondary names Abkar, "shining cow", and Ablulu, "the one who makes the cows abundant". He could be addressed as a herdsman in astral context, with stars being poetically described as his herd. In addition to cows, he could also be associated with sheep and with wild animals inhabiting steppes, especially ibexes and gazelles.

Sin was perceived as a benign deity who could be petitioned for help. He was responsible for guaranteeing abundance and growth, especially in Ur and Harran, which most likely reflects the well attested phenomenon of locally assigning such a role to tutelary deities of specific areas. It was also believed that he could provide people with offspring, as evidenced by prayer in which he is asked for that by childless worshipers, both men and women. He was also believed to aid pregnant women, both during the beginning of pregnancy and in labour. This aspect of his character is highlighted in the incantation Cow of Sîn, which states that he would send a pair of lamassu goddesses to help mothers with difficult births. The common epithet of Sin, "father" (a-a), underlined his ability to cause growth and bring abundance. However, it also reflected his role as a senior member of his pantheon, as well as his authority over deities regarded as his children or servants. It has also been suggested that it metaphorically referred to him as the divine representation of the full moon, with texts instead describing him as a youthful god instead reflecting his role as the new moon. Another epithet commonly applied to him was lugal ("king"). Presumably it constituted an implicit reference to his status as the tutelary god of Ur. In the first millennium BCE, as the god of Harran he could be called Bēl-Ḫarrān (^{d}EN.KASKAL), "lord of Harran". This title appears particularly commonly in theophoric names.

Sin could also function as a divine judge in the underworld, as attested for example in the so-called First Elegy of the Pushkin Museum, in which a man named Ludingira hopes that he will proclaim a good verdict for his deceased father. This role might have originally developed as a way to explain why the moon is not visible for a part of each month. The composition in mention states that his judgment took place on the day of the disappearance of the moon (Sumerian u_{4}-ná, Akkadian ūm bubbuli). However, Dina Katz argues that in contrast with the frequent assignment of a similar role to Shamash, Sin was usually not associated with judgment of either the living or the dead. References to both of them acting as judges are nonetheless known from Old Babylonian inscriptions.

In Mesopotamian medicine skin diseases, especially leprosy (saḫaršubbû), as well as epileptic symptoms, could be interpreted as a manifestation of Sin's wrath. The former are also mentioned in curse formulas as a punishment he could inflict upon oath breakers.

=== As the head of the pantheon ===
A number of sources attest the existence of a tradition in which Sin was regarded as the sole head of the Mesopotamian pantheon or a deity equal in rank to the traditional kings of the gods, Anu and Enlil. According to Wilfred G. Lambert, most of the evidence for this view postdates the reign of Meli-Shipak II, and indicates it might have been particularly popular in Harran. An Old Babylonian literary composition written in Sumerian describes Sin as the head of the divine assembly (Ubšu’ukkin), with Anu, Enlil, Inanna, Utu, Enki and Ninhursag serving as his advisers. Two of his titles known from the god list An = Anum, ^{d}Ukkin ("the assembly") and Ukkin-uru ("mighty assembly"), might reflect this portrayal. Some Old Babylonian theophoric names might also be connected to the view that Sin was the head of the pantheon, namely Sîn-bēl-ili ("Sin is the lord of the gods"), Sîn-šar-ili ("Sin is the king of the gods") or Sîn-il-ili ("Sin is god of the gods"). Lambert notes that while similar names invoking other gods, for example Shamash and Adad, are also known, Sîn-bēl-ili is ultimately the most common.

Examples of texts elevating Sin's rank are known from Ur from the period of the Neo-Assyrian governor Sîn-balāssu-iqbi's reign. The moon god was in this case seemingly reinterpreted as a "local Enlil”, acting as the king of the gods in Ur. It has been argued that the view that Sin was the supreme god was later particularly enthusiastically supported by the last Neo-Babylonian ruler, Nabonidus. In one of his inscriptions from Harran Sin is described as the "lord of the gods" who possessed "Enlilship", "Anuship" and "Eaship". However, Melanie Groß stresses that Nabonidus' devotion should for the most part not be treated as an unusual phenomenon, save for the fact that Harran was not the center of his empire. She notes that the elevation of city deities significant for specific rulers to the top of the pantheon of the respective states is well documented for example in the case of Marduk and Ashur. Aino Hätinen points out that in Harran similar formulas were used to refer to Sin by Ashurbanipal, and are thus not unique to Nabonidus and do not necessarily indicate elevation of this god during his reign. She suggests both Nabonidus and Ashurbanipal relied on so-called "Theology of the Moon", a concept well attested in explanatory texts from the first millennium BCE according to which Sin possessed divine powers (Sumerian ĝarza, Akkadian parṣū) equal to these of Anu, Enlil and Ea during the first half of the lunar month.

== Iconography ==
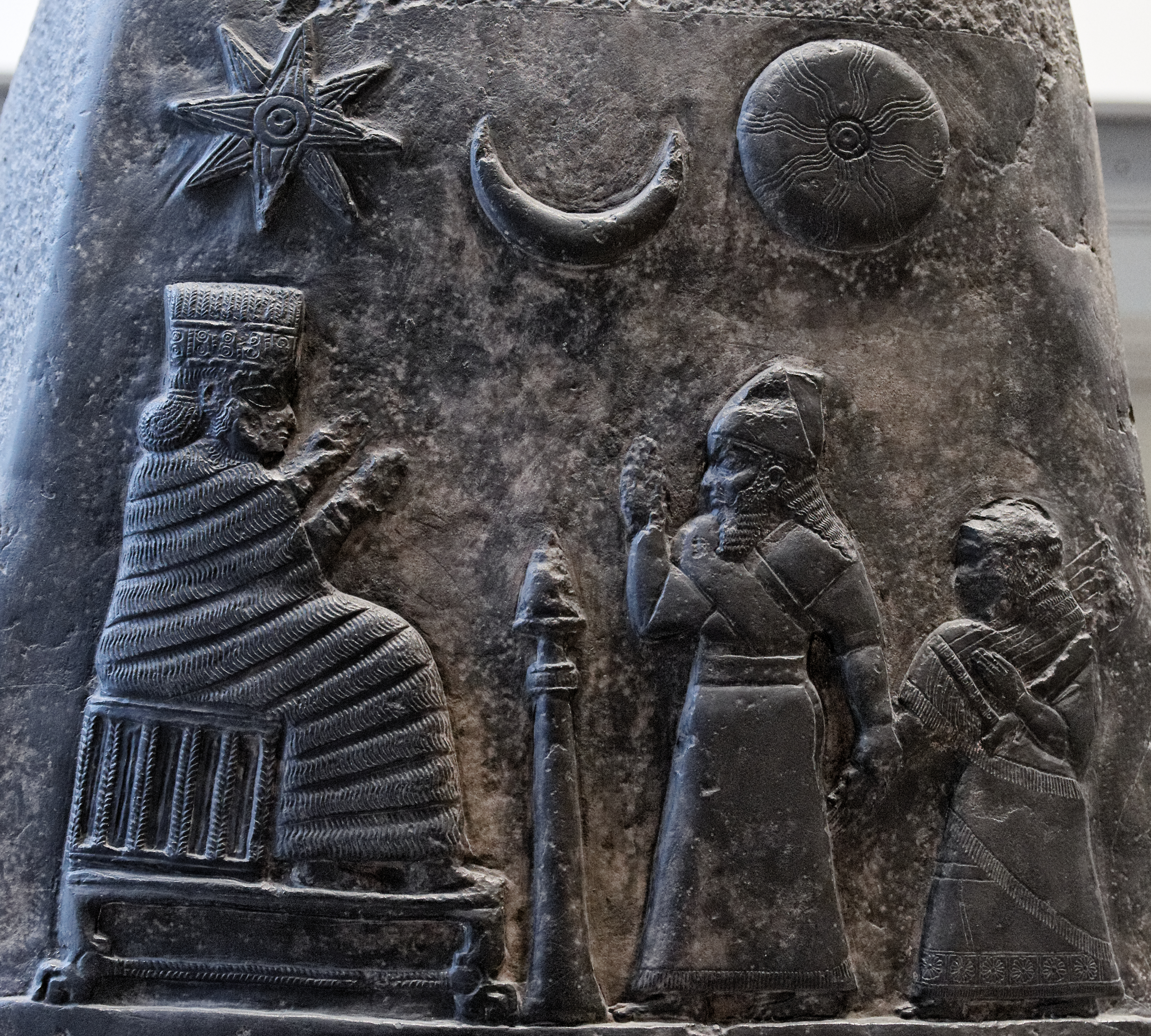
Symbols representing Sin (center), Ishtar (left) and Shamash (right), as depicted on the upper half of a kudurru of Meli-Shipak II.

Despite Sin's popularity documented in textual sources, depictions of him are not common in Mesopotamian art. His most common attribute was the crescent. In accordance with the appearance of the new moon in the latitude of Mesopotamia, it was consistently represented as recumbent. It was frequently compared to bull horns and to a barge. On seals, Sin could be depicted with the crescent either placed on his tiara or atop a standard he held. It was also used to represent him on kudurru, decorated boundary stones. It consistently occurs in the upper section of such objects, next to symbols of Shamash and Ishtar, though their exact arrangement can vary. A survey of 110 stones or their fragments indicated that this trio of deities is depicted on all known kudurru. Aniconic portrayals of Sin as the lunar crescent also predominate in Neo-Assyrian and Neo-Babylonian art. Furthermore, the logogram ^{d}U_{4}.SAKAR (𒀭𒌓𒊬) which could be used to write his name was derived from a term referring to the crescent.

Like other Mesopotamian gods Sin was depicted as a mature, bearded man dressed in a flounced robe. In some cases he holds a mace or a stick, with the latter occurring particularly often, though these attributes were not exclusively associated with him and cannot be used to identify depictions of him. A further object associated with him in art was a tripod, possibly a candelabrum, sometimes with a lunar crescent on top and with an unidentified sandal-like object hanging from it.

In some cases, Sin could be portrayed rising from between two mountains, similarly to Shamash, and Dominique Collon has suggests that in some cases reassessment of works of art often presumed to represent the latter in this situation might be necessary due to this similarity. Depictions of Sin in a barge are known too, and presumably reflect the belief that he traversed the night sky in this vehicle, as documented in textual sources. Based on Old Babylonian sources is presumed that the lunar barge was considered a representation of a phase of the moon, specifically the gibbous moon. It could be metaphorically compared to a type bowl (Sumerian dilim_{2}, Akkadian tilimtu), apparently also regarded as an attribute of the moon god. Piotr Steinkeller suggests that the latter might have been considered a representation of the half moon.

Ningal, the wife of Sin, could be depicted alongside him for example in banquet scenes. On the stele of Ur-Nammu she sits in his lap. This type of depictions was meant to display the intimate nature of a connection between the deities and highlight their ability to act in unison, and is also attested for Bau and Ningirsu.

== Associations with other deities ==
=== Parents and siblings ===
Enlil and Ninlil were usually regarded as Sin's parents. It has been argued that an Early Dynastic text from Abu Salabikh already refers to Enlil and Ninlil as his parents, though an alternate view is that he oldest certain evidence only goes back to the reign of Ur-Nammu of the Third Dynasty of Ur. It has been argued that in this period he might have started to be viewed as a son of Enlil for political reasons. The compilers of the god list An = Anum apparently did not acknowledge this tradition directly, as in contrast with Ninurta Sin does not appear in the section focused on Enlil and his family. However, his status as his son is seemingly reflected in the epithets Dumununna, "son of the prince", and Dumugi, "noble son". Sin is also kept separate from Enlil in the Old Babylonian forerunner of this text, which has been argued to be a reflection of an earlier tradition in which they were not viewed as son and father. While references to Anu being the father of Sin are also known, they are most likely metaphorical, and do not represent a distinct genealogical tradition.

In the myth Enlil and Ninlil Sin's brothers are Nergal, Ninazu and Enbilulu, though the latter two gods were commonly regarded as sons of different parents instead. Enbilulu in particular is not attested as a son of Enlil and Ninlil in any other sources. Based on their shared status as sons of Enlil Sin and Nergal were sometimes referred to as the "big twins", and in this context were identified with Lugal-irra and Meslamta-ea. The connection between Lugal-Irra and Sin seemingly depended on the latter's occasional role as a judge in the underworld. An astronomical text equates the pair Sin and Nergal with Latarak and Lulal, but this attestation is unparalleled in other sources.

=== Wife and children ===
Sin's wife was Ningal. They are already attested as a couple in Early Dynastic sources, and they were consistently paired with each other in all regions of Mesopotamia. Derivatives of Ningal were associated with local moon gods in the Ugaritic, Hurrian and Hittite pantheons. However, the old proposal that Hurrians, and by extension Hittites and inhabitants of Ugarit, received her from Harran is regarded as unproven, as she does not appear in association with this city in any sources from the second millennium BCE. She is also absent from Luwian sources pertaining to the worship of Sin of Harran in the first millennium BCE.

The best attested children of Sin were Utu (Shamash) and Inanna (Ishtar). The connection between these three deities depended on their shared astral character, with Sin representing the moon and his children, who could be identified as twins - the sun and Venus. Numerous instances of Inanna being directly referred to as his oldest daughter are known. While alternate traditions about her parentage are attested, it is agreed they were less significant and ultimately she was most commonly recognized as a daughter of Sin and Ningal. It has been pointed out that apparent references to Anu being her father instead might only designate him as an ancestor. Similarly to how Sin was referred as the "great boat of heaven" (^{d}má-gul-la-an-na), his son was the "small boat of heaven" (^{d}má-bàn-da-an-na), which reflected his subordinate status. These titles additionally reflected the Mesopotamian belief that the moon was larger than the sun. As an extension of her marriage to the sun god, the dawn goddess Aya was regarded as a daughter-in-law of Sin, as reflected by her common epithet kallatum.

Further attested children of Sin include the goddesses Amarazu and Amaraḫea, known from the god list An = Anum, Ningublaga (the city god of Kiabrig) and Numushda (the city god of Kazallu). Ningublaga's connection with the moon god is well attested in god lists (An = Anum, the Weidner god list, the Nippur god list) and other sources, one example being the formula "servant of Sin and Ningublaga," known from an Old Babylonian cylinder seal. While he was not always explicitly identified as his son, with such references lacking for example from An = Anum, direct statements confirming the existence of such a tradition have been identified in an inscription of Abisare of Larsa and in a hymn dedicated to Ningublaga's temple in Kiabrig. Designating Numushda as a son of Sin was likely meant to be a way to assimilate him into the pantheon of lower Mesopotamia, and might be based on perceived similarity to Ningublaga. The tradition according to which he was a son of the moon god is absent from sources from the third millennium BCE. Additionally, a single literary text calls Numushda a son of Enki, rather than Sin and Ningal. Amarazu and Amaraḫea are overall sparsely attested, and despite their status as Sin's daughters in god lists and the incantation series Udug Hul there is no evidence they were worshiped alongside him in Ur. The reason behind the association between these two goddesses and the moon god is unknown.

While references to Ninegal as a daughter of Sin are known, in this context the name is treated as an epithet of Inanna, and there is no evidence Ninegal understood as a distinct goddess was associated with him in any way. Another deity associated with Ishtar who was sometimes described as daughter of Sin was the love goddess Nanaya. However, this tradition seems to stem from the close connection between Nanaya and Inanna, as for example the Hymn to the City of Arbela in a passage focused on Ishtar of Arbela refers to Nanaya as a daughter of Sin, but also syncretises her with the goddess being praised. Sources where Nanaya's father is instead either Anu or Urash (the male tutelary god of Dilbat, rather than the earth goddess of the same name) are known too. Only in Assyria in the Neo-Assyrian period she was regarded as a daughter of Sin. A god list from Nineveh might indicate that she was viewed as a daughter of the moon god specifically when she was counted among deities belonging to the entourage of Enlil. A further goddess related to Inanna, Annunitum, could similarly be addressed as a daughter of Sin, though this tradition is only preserved in inscriptions of Nabonidus documenting the repair of her temple in Sippar. Due to identification with Inanna, the Hurrian and Elamite goddess Pinikir is referred to as a daughter of Sin and Ningal in a text written in Akkadian but found in a corpus of Hurro-Hittite rituals.

In a single Maqlû incantation, Manzat, the goddess of the rainbow, appears as the sister of Shamash, and by extension as daughter of his parents, Sin and Ningal.

A tradition according to which Ninazu was a son of Sin is also known. Frans Wiggermann proposes that the occasional association between these two gods might have reflected the dependence of Enegi, Ninazu's cult center, on nearby Ur.

In the first millennium BCE a tradition according to which Nuska was a son of Sin developed in Harran. Manfred Krebernik suggests that it might have reflected Aramaic influence and that it resulted from a connection between Sin, Nuska and hitherto unknown deities worshiped by this group.

While assertions that Ishkur was regarded as a further son of Sin can be found in older literature, no primary sources confirm the existence of such a tradition.

=== Court ===
Sin's sukkal (attendant deity) was Alammuš. He and Ningublaga were often associated with each other and could be even referred to as twin brothers. Manfred Krebernik notes that this might indicate that he was also viewed as a son of the moon god. However, no direct evidence supporting this notion has been identified, and therefore whether he was ever regarded as a child of Sin remains impossible to ascertain. Alammuš also possessed his own attendant, Urugal.

In the Old Babylonian forerunner of An = Anum, Nindara is listed among the deities belonging to the entourage of Sin. This god was originally worshiped as the husband of Nanshe in the state of Lagash in the Early Dynastic period. In An = Anum itself he and Sin are directly identified with each other (tablet III, line 65), and the lines following this statement list Nanshe and their children. However, there is no evidence that this equation was responsible for the lack of references to Nindara in the Sealand archives, as Nanshe was not worshiped in association with Sin in this context. Nin-MAR.KI, who was traditionally regarded as Nanshe's daughter, is also placed in the section of An = Anum dedicated to Sin, though according to Walther Sallaberger her presence there might reflect her well attested association with cattle, which she shared with the moon god. Further members of his entourage include deities such as Nineigara, referred to his "lady of the treasury" (nin-èrim, Akkadian bēlet išitti) and "obedient housekeeper"(munus-agrig šu-dim_{4}-ma, Akkadian abarakkatu saniqtu), Nimintabba, and Ninurima. In medical texts, the demon Bennu, responsible for causing epilepsy, is described as his "deputy" (šanê) as well.

In An = Anum Suzianna and Ninimma, both usually regarded as courtiers of Enlil, are also identified as Sin's nurses.

=== Other lunar deities ===
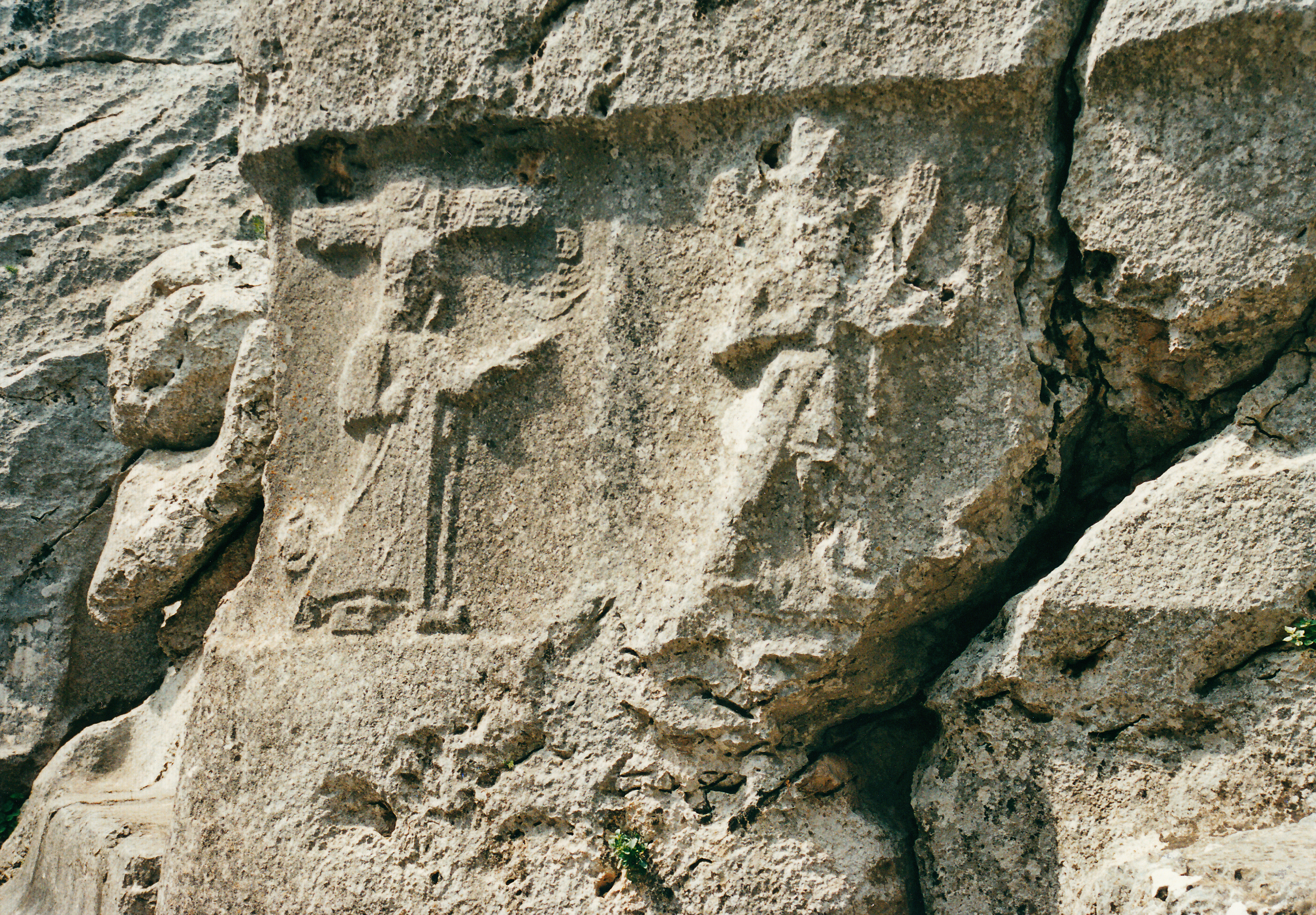
A relief of Kušuḫ (right), the Hurrian moon god, from Yazılıkaya

The Hurrian moon god, variously known as Kušuḫ, Umbu or Ušu, was identified with Sin and his name was sometimes written logographically as ^{d}EN.ZU or ^{d}30. It is possible that his character was influenced by exposure to Mesopotamian culture and the image of the moon god in it in particular.

Equivalence between Sin and Yarikh is documented in an Akkadian-Amorite bilingual lexical list presumed to originate in lower Mesopotamia and dated to the Old Babylonian period. The two of them are also equated in an Ugaritic god list. The name of Yarikh (Yariḫ) and its variants are cognate with terms referring both to the moon and to month as a measure of time in multiple Semitic languages, including both Amorite and Ugaritic. While neither the names Nanna nor Sin share such a linguistic affinity, the respective Sumerian (itud) and Akkadian (warḫum) words for moon and month are likewise the same. As noted by Nick Wyatt, Nikkal, the counterpart of Ningal regarded as the wife of Yarikh in Ugarit, likely reached the coastal city via a Hurrian intermediary, and it is possible that the myth describing their marriage was based on a Mesopotamian or Hurrian original, focused on either Sin or Kušuḫ. However, Steve A. Wiggins states that despite the connection between Sin and Yarikh the latter shows a number of traits distinct from his counterpart, for example literary texts at times compare him to a dog, an animal not associated with the Mesopotamian moon god.

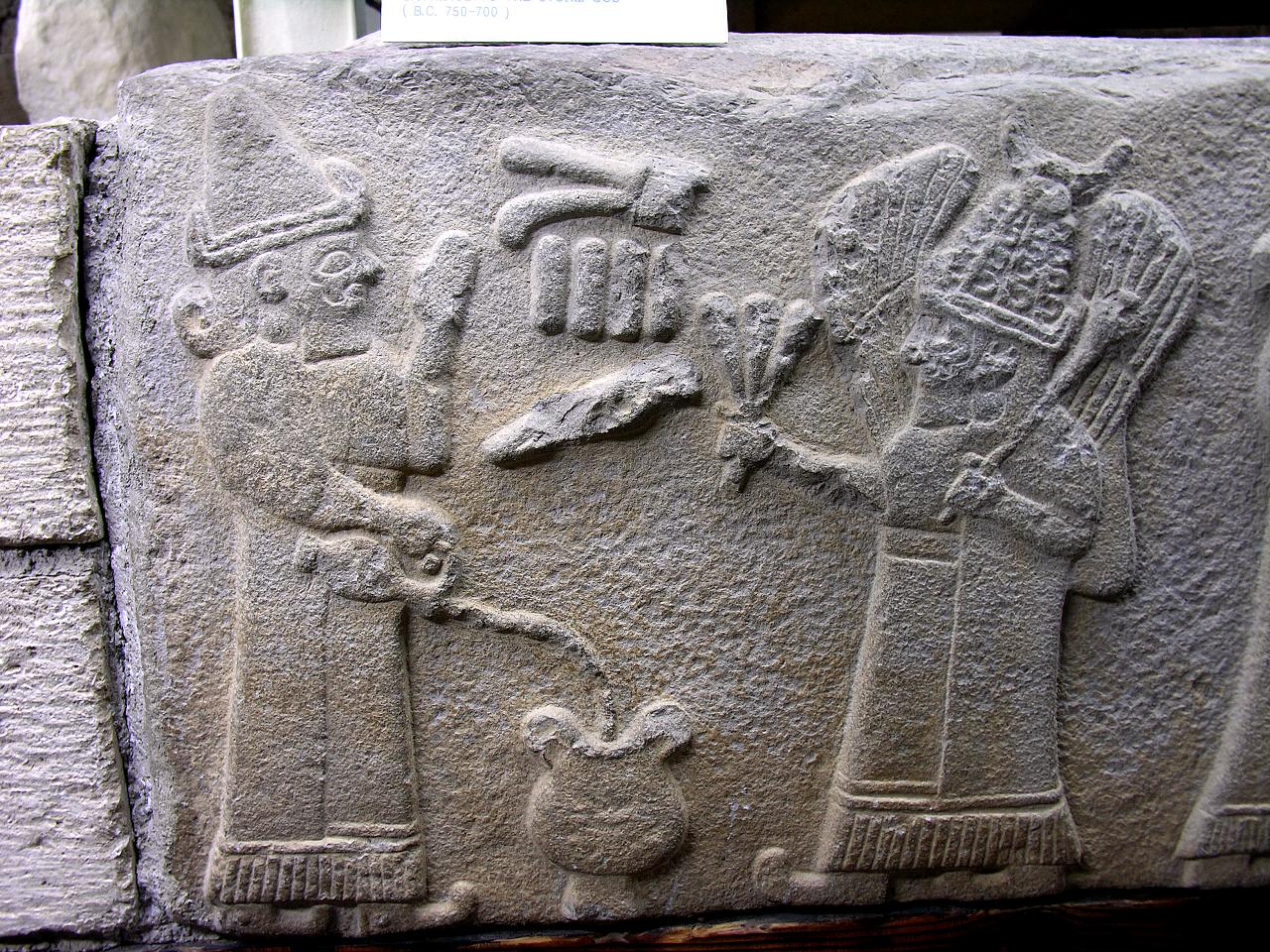
A relief depicting the offering of a libation to the Anatolian moon god Arma (right).

In Hittite and Luwian sources the logographic writings ^{d}30 and ^{d}EN.ZU were used to render the name of the Anatolian moon god Arma. As noted by Piotr Taracha, while ^{d}30 was also used to represent the name of the Hattian moon god Kašku in the corresponding version of the myth The Moon that Fell from Heaven, it is improbable that it designates him in cultic texts, as he was a deity of little relevance in Hattian and Hittite religion.

In Emar, ^{d}30 might have been used as a logogram to represent the name of the local god Saggar, who in addition to fulfilling a lunar role was also the divine personification of the Sinjar Mountains. Both he and Sin (Suinu) were worshiped in Ebla in the third millennium BCE, possibly with each representing a different lunar phase. It has been suggested that the logogram ^{d}EN.ZU designated Saggar in this city, but according to Alfonso Archi this is unlikely. Lunar character is sometimes also proposed for a further Eblaite deity, Hadabal (^{d}NI-da-KUL), though Archi similarly disagrees with this view. However, he does accept the possibility that the theophoric name of a king of Ibubu mentioned in an Eblaite text, Li-im-^{d}EN.ZU, a different deity than Sin was meant.

The logogram ^{d}30 was also used to render the name of the Elamite moon deity, possibly to be identified with Napir, though Manfred Krebernik notes that in one case the name Nannar appears to be attested in Elamite context, specifically in an inscription of Shilhak-Inshushinak.

A bilingual Akkadian-Kassite lexical list indicates that the Kassite deity regarded as the counterpart of Sin was Ši-ḪU (reading of the second sign uncertain), well attested as an element of theophoric names, though he was more commonly equated with Marduk in similar sources.

== Worship ==
Sin was recognized as a major deity all across ancient Mesopotamia. His status was already high in the earliest periods to which the history of the Mesopotamian pantheon can be traced. It is presumed that Sin was actively worshiped in most of the major cities of the region, with remains of multiple temples dedicated to him identified during excavations both in Babylonia and in Assyria.

=== Ur ===
==== Early history ====
Ur was already well established as the cult center of the moon god, initially under his Sumerian name Nanna, in Early Dynastic times, as attested in the Zame Hymns from Abu Salabikh. His primary temple this city was Ekišnugal, "house of the great light". Sanctuaries bearing this name also existed in other cities, which is presumed to reflect Ur's central importance in the sphere of religion. The first certain attestation of this ceremonial name has been dated to the reign of Utu-hegal, though it is possible it was already used in the times of Eannatum. Through history, it was rebuilt or patronized by multiple rulers, including Naram-Sin of Akkad, Ur-Nammu of Ur, various rulers from the Isin-Larsa period, Kurigalzu I of the Kassite dynasty of Babylon, Marduk-nadin-ahhe and Adad-apla-iddina of the Second Dynasty of Isin, and Nebuchadnezzar II of the Neo-Babylonian Empire. Other houses of worship dedicated to Sin existed in Ur too. For example, liturgical texts mention the ceremonial name Edimanna, "house, bond of heaven". Enamnunna, "house of princeliness", rebuilt by Sin-Iddinam, might have been located in Ur too. A ziggurat dedicated to Sin was constructed during the reign of Ur-Nammu. It bore the name Elugalgalgasisa, "house of the king who lets counsel flourish".

Kings from the Third Dynasty of Ur believed themselves to be appointed to their position by Sin. His cult flourished during their reigns, as evidenced both by structures uncensored during excavations and by the numerous dedicatory inscriptions. An inscription from this period refers to him as one of the major members of the pantheon, next to Enlil, Ninlil, Inanna, Enki, Nergal, Ninurta, Nuska, Ninshubur and the deified hero Gilgamesh, included in the enumeration due to his importance for the ruling house. Ibbi-Sin at one point dedicated the image of a "red dog of Meluhha" to Sin. According to the document describing this offering, the animal bore the evocative name "He bites!"

==== The en priestesses ====
An important aspect of the lunar cult in Ur was the institution of the en priestess. In Akkadian its holders were referred to as entum. Their residence was known as Gipar, and while initially separate in the Old Babylonian period it was combined into a single complex with the temple of the moon god's wife, Ningal. Not much is known about the duties of the en in the sphere of cult, though they apparently played a role in building and renovation activities. They are chiefly documented in sources from between the Sargonic and early Old Babylonian periods. They were typically daughters of kings.

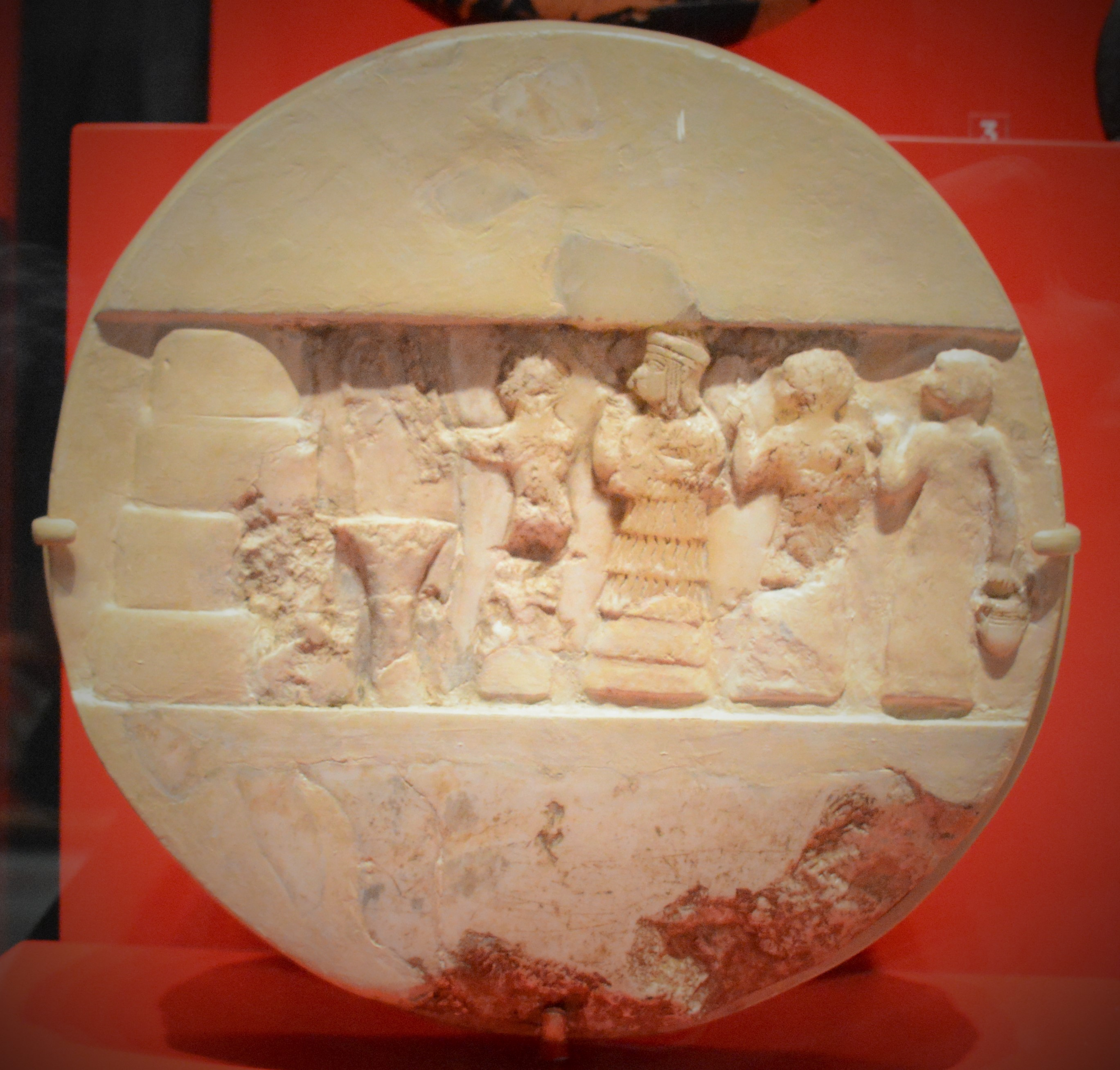
The disc of Enheduanna.

Enheduanna, the daughter of Sargon of Akkad, was a particularly famous en priestess. She is also the earliest attested holder of this office, with available evidence including the so-called "disc of Enheduanna", seals of her servants, and literary compositions copied in later periods traditionally attributed to her. It is it not certain if the office of en was only established at this point in time as an innovation, or if it developed from an earlier Early Dynastic title tied to the cult of the moon god. Later en priestesses include Enmenanna, daughter of Sargon's grandson Naram-Sin of Akkad (named as "zirru priestess of the god Nanna, spouse of the god N[anna], entu priestess of the god Sin at Ur"); Enannepada, daughter of Ur-Baba of Lagash and the only holder of this office from the Second Dynasty of Lagash; Ennirgalana, daughter of Ur-Nammu of Ur; Ennirzianna, a contemporary and possibly daughter of Shulgi; her successors Enuburzianna and Enmahgalana, the former also selected during the reign of Shulgi and the latter shortly after by Amar-Sin; Enannatumma, daughter of Ishme-Dagan of Isin who retained her position after his death and conquest of the city of Ur by Larsa; Enšakiag-Nanna, daughter of Sumuel of Larsa; and her successor Enanedu, daughter of Kudur-Mabuk of Larsa and sister of Warad-Sin and Rim-Sîn I. She was the last known holder of this office before its revival of in the Neo-Babylonian period.

As attested for the first time during the reign of Amar-Sin, separate office of en of Nanna existed in nearby Karzida. Only two of its holders are known, both of them active contemporarily with this king: Enagazianna and En-Nanna-Amar-Suen-kiagra. Sparsely attested Enmegalanna, known only from a single reference to funerary offerings meant for her from the early Old Babylonian period, might have been a further en from Karzida, though it is ultimately unknown whether she resided there or in Ur.

It is presumed that while prominent in the third and early second millennia BCE, the institution of en gradually declined and finally disappeared.

==== Later evidence ====
Sources dealing with the worship of Sin in Ur after the Old Babylonian period are less common than these from early periods.

While Ur is not directly referenced in any of the texts agreed to come from the archives of the First Sealand dynasty, it is nonetheless possible that both the city and Sin had a particular importance to rulers belonging to it. He is one of the best attested deities in the Sealand text corpus next to Nanshe, Ishtar, Ninurta and Shamash. He is the single most common deity in theophoric names from it, which reflects his popularity in the onomasticon attested from Old Babylonian to Middle Babylonian period. At the same time, other evidence points to his cult only having a modest scope, which might indicate its center was a temple only loosely tied to the royal administration. Three texts indicate he could receive offerings in the beginning of a lunar month, during the new moon. He is also invoked alongside Enlil, Ea and the respective spouses of all three of these gods (Ningal, Ninlil and Damkina) in a seal inscription of Akurduana. In addition to the worship of Sin himself, offerings to a distinct manifestation of Inanna known under the epithet "daughter of Sin", ^{d}(INANNA.)DUMU(.MÍ)-^{(d)}30(‐NA)/^{d}EN.ZU are also documented in the Sealand texts.

With the exception of Kurigalzu I, rulers of the Kassite dynasty showed little interest in Ur. During his reign the Edublamaḫ, "house, exalted door socket", originally a court of law dedicated to Sin build by Shu-Ilishu to commemorate the return of a statue of this god from Anshan, was rebuilt as a temple.

Little is known about the worship of Sin in Ur during the reign of the Second Dynasty of Isin and beyond, as no late temple archive has been discovered, and the information is limited to scarce archeological evidence for building activity and a small number of commemorative inscriptions. The oldest of them come from the middle of the seventh century BCE, when the city was under the control of a local dynasty of governors loyal to the Neo-Assyrian Empire. It is uncertain to what degree the Neo-Assyrian rulers themselves were involved in the religious traditions of Ur. One of the governors, Sîn-balāssu-iqbi, son of Ningal-iddin and contemporary of Ashurbanipal, apparently capitalized on a local economic boom to renovate Ekišnugal. He also rebuilt Elugalgalgasisa.

After the period of Sîn-balāssu-iqbi's activity sources pertaining to the worship of Sin in Ur only reappear during the reign of Nebuchadnezzar II, who similarly renovated Ekišnugal. He might have been motivated by the importance he attributed to the moon god as responsible for determining destiny through lunar omens. His successor Nabonidus carried out further construction work pertaining to the cult of Sin in Ur. He commissioned multiple large building projects, including the reconstruction of houses of worship connected to Sin and his wife Ningal. Elugalgalgasisa was among them, and in an inscription commemorating this event the king asserted work on the same structure had earlier been made by Ur-Nammu and Shulgi. He also showed interest in earlier traditions of Ur and revived the institution of the en priestess, placing his daughter in this role and bestowing the new name Ennigaldi-Nanna ("priestess requested by Nanna") upon her. Her birth name is unknown. In an inscription Nabonidus claimed that he relied on a document authored by Enanedu while restoring the office. Paul-Alain Beaulieu notes that his investigation of the nature of the office of en priestess in the previous periods of Mesopotamian history can be compared to a degree to the work of a modern archeologist.

=== Harran ===
==== Early history ====
In upper Mesopotamia, the most widely recognized cult center of Sin was Harran. Melanie Groß states that Sin might have been introduced to Harran from Ur during the reign of the Third Dynasty of Ur, when the city served primarily as a trading center. Similar view has been advanced by Steven Holloway. However, Harran is first linked with Sin in texts from the Old Babylonian period. The city itself is already attested in Eblaite sources from the twenty fourth century BCE. They indicate it was among the settlements which officially recognized the hegemony of Ebla over northern Syria. While Sin (Suinu) was worshiped in this area, offerings to him are not mentioned frequently in the Eblaite archive, and the city regarded as his cult center was apparently NI-rar. Alfonso Archi argues that he was not introduced there from lower Mesopotamia, and points out he was locally associated with the Balikh River. A single source mentions an individual who served as a priest of both Suinu and Baliḫa, a duo of deities representing this watercourse.

==== Second millennium BCE ====
The oldest evidence for the worship of Sin in Harran might be an inscription of Naram-Suen of Eshnunna dated to the late nineteenth century BCE, though its reading remains uncertain, and it is generally assumed the earliest unambiguous references to "Sin of Harran" (^{d}EN.ZU ša ḫa-ar-ra-nim^{ki}) occur in texts from Mari from the reign of Zimri-Lim (1782-1759 BCE), such as a letter mentioning a temple dedicated to him. It states that the local ruler, Asdi-Takim, signed a treaty with the kings of Zalmaqqum and the elders of DUMU-iamina in this house of worship. It was known as Eḫulḫul (𒂍𒄾𒄾), "house which gives joy", though this ceremonial name is not attested before the Neo-Assyrian period. Due to continuous occupation of Harran no buildings predating late antiquity have been identified during excavations, and as of 2023 the exact location of the temple of Sin is unknown.

The worship of Sin in Harran is not well documented through the rest of the second millennium BCE, though he does appear among the divine witnesses in a treaty between Šuppiluliuma I of the Hittite Empire and Šattiwaza of the Mitanni Empire as one of the deities of the latter of these two states. Alfonso Archi points out that he and Kušuḫ, the Hurrian moon god, are listed separately in this source. There is no evidence that Sin of Harran was worshiped by Hittites. However, he was incorporated into Luwian religion, as indicated by references to his introduction to Tarḫuntašša from the second millennium BCE. Manfred Hutter states that his cult spread there from Kizzuwatna, where he and Kušuḫ were the moon deities favored by Luwians, in contrast with Arma's popularity among western Luwian communities.

==== First millennium BCE ====
The popularity of Sin of Harran grew in the Iron Age. He became an important deity in the local pantheon of Tabal. Even though Arma continued to be worshiped by the Luwian communities residing in Pamphylia, Cilicia, Caria and Lycia, among eastern Luwians he was entirely displaced by Sin of Harran as the moon god. The latter is mentioned alongside deities such as Tarḫunz and Kubaba in an inscription of Himayata on a stela from Til Barsip. He also appears alongside Kubaba in curse formulas in multiple inscriptions from Tabal.

While no references to Sin of Harran occur in Assyrian sources from the Middle Assyrian period, even though it is possible his cult center was incorporated into the Middle Assyrian administrative system as early as during the reign of Tukulti-Ninurta I, evidence for royal patronage of his temple is available from the subsequent Neo-Assyrian period. Steven W. Holloway suggests the Neo-Assyrian Empire strived to adopt the cult of Sin, popular among the local population, for the sake of royal propaganda. It attained a particular importance in Assyria from the reign of Sargon II onward. Esarhaddon received astronomical reports from the galamāḫu ("chief lamentation priest") of Sin of Harran. Ashurbanipal renovated the Eḫulḫul and most likely took part in an akitu celebration in this city, possibly while returning from his campaign against Egypt.

Royal cult of Sin in Harran ceased after the fall of Assyria, and after the defeat of Aššur-uballiṭ II his temple was looted by Nabopolassar and his Median allies (Ummanmanda). However, royal interest in it was revived later on in the Neo-Babylonian period by Nabonidus. His mother Adad-guppi most likely hailed from this city, and she was either a priestess of Sin or an upper class laywoman particularly devoted to this god. It has been suggested that her personal devotion to the tutelary god of Harran influenced the religious outlook of her son. The rebuilding of Eḫulḫul started during the reign of Nabonidus, but it is not known if the project was complete by the time he was deposed by Cyrus the Great in 539 BCE.

Harran retained importance as a religious site after the fall of the Neo-Babylonian Empire through the Persian, Hellenistic and Roman periods, though references to it are less common than in earlier sources. Presumably the temple of Sin retained its form from the reign of Nabonidus under the Achaemenids, but it was most likely rebuilt under Greek rule. Coins from the mint established in Harran in the late fourth century BCE under the rule of Antigonus I Monophthalmus are marked with a crescent, which is presumed to be an indication of continuation of the worship of Sin. Lunar symbols continued to appear on locally minted coins in the Roman period, with examples available from the reigns of Roman emperors such as Lucius Verus, Septimius Severus and Elagabalus.

=== Other areas ===
==== Nippur ====
Sin is already mentioned in an Early Dynastic inscription of Lugalzagesi from Nippur, with the name Nanna only appearing in sources from this city later on. A temple dedicated to Sin known under the ceremonial name Ekišnugal existed in Bīt-Suenna, which was seemingly a suburb of this city. The so-called Nippur Compendium mentions a nameless temple dedicated to him located in Nippur itself, and states that he was worshiped there alongside Ningal, Ishtar, Shamash, Shuzianna and Kalkal. He was also venerated in one of the four chapels in the temple of Ninlil, with the other three dedicated to Ninhursag, Nintinugga and Nisaba. In theophoric names from Kassite Nippur, Sin is the single most common deity, appearing 129 times in available sources in this context.

==== Babylon and Borsippa ====
In Babylon, Sin is first attested in the Old Babylonian period during the reign of Sumu-abum, who constructed a temple dedicated to him, though it is not certain to which of the sanctuaries documented in later sources it corresponded. One of them shared the name Ekišnugal with the temple from Ur, as attested in inscriptions of Hammurabi, Samsu-iluna and Nebuchadnezzar II. A second house of worship dedicated to him, Enitendu, "house of (pleasant) rest", existed in the east of the same city, as indicated by inscriptions of Ammi-Ditana and Ammi-Saduqa. Sin was also worshiped in the temple of Bēlet-Bābili, a local hypostasis of Ishtar, presumably due to his well documented role as the father of this goddess. In the Seleucid period, Antiochos I on one occasion made offerings to Sin in Babylon. However, it is presumed that his religious policy with regards to veneration of local deities was unique and should not be regarded as the standard for Seleucid rulers, as it finds no direct parallel in sources pertaining to other members of this dynasty.

Sin was also worshiped in the immediate proximity of Babylon in Damru, as evidenced by his epithet bēl Damru, "lord of Damru". A temple dedicated to him bearing the ceremonial name Egissubiduga, "house whose shade is pleasant", existed in this settlement.

Evidence for the worship of Sin in nearby Borsippa is available from the Neo-Babylonian period and late sources, though he was likely present in this city earlier already. In the Ezida temple complex, which was dedicated to Nabu (earlier Marduk, initially Tutu), there existed a sanctuary dedicated to him known as Edimanna, "house, bond of heaven", as attested in an inscription of Nebuchadnezzar II commemorating its rebuilding and in a Neo-Babylonian administrative text. It is possible his presence in the local pantheon reflected a connection between him and Nanaya.

==== Uruk ====
In Uruk the worship of Sin is first documented in the Old Babylonian period, with an offering list using his Sumerian name and an administrative text the Akkadian one. His temple in this city was known under the ceremonial name Edumununna, "house of the son of the prince". In the Neo-Babylonian period he was most likely worshiped in this city in a small chapel, so-called ekurrātu. Three manifestations of him received offerings, with Sin "of the courtyard" (ša kisalli) and "of heaven" (ša šamê) attested in addition to the standard form of this god. However, the significance of these two more specific manifestations was minor. In three cases, Sin and "Sin of heaven" appear in the same texts as two distinct deities.

A reference to a sanctuary of Sin occurs in a text from the reign of Darius the Great as well. He also continued to be venerated in Uruk in the Seleucid period, as indicated by references to him in both ritual and legal texts, as well as attested theophoric names invoking him. He might have been one of the deities worshiped in the Bīt Rēš, "head temple," a new temple complex dedicated to Anu and Antu which was built in this period. According to Julia Krul, it can be assumed that his presence in the local pantheon of Uruk was also the reason behind the introduction of Ningal and Ningublaga to the city documented in late sources.

==== Other Babylonian cities ====
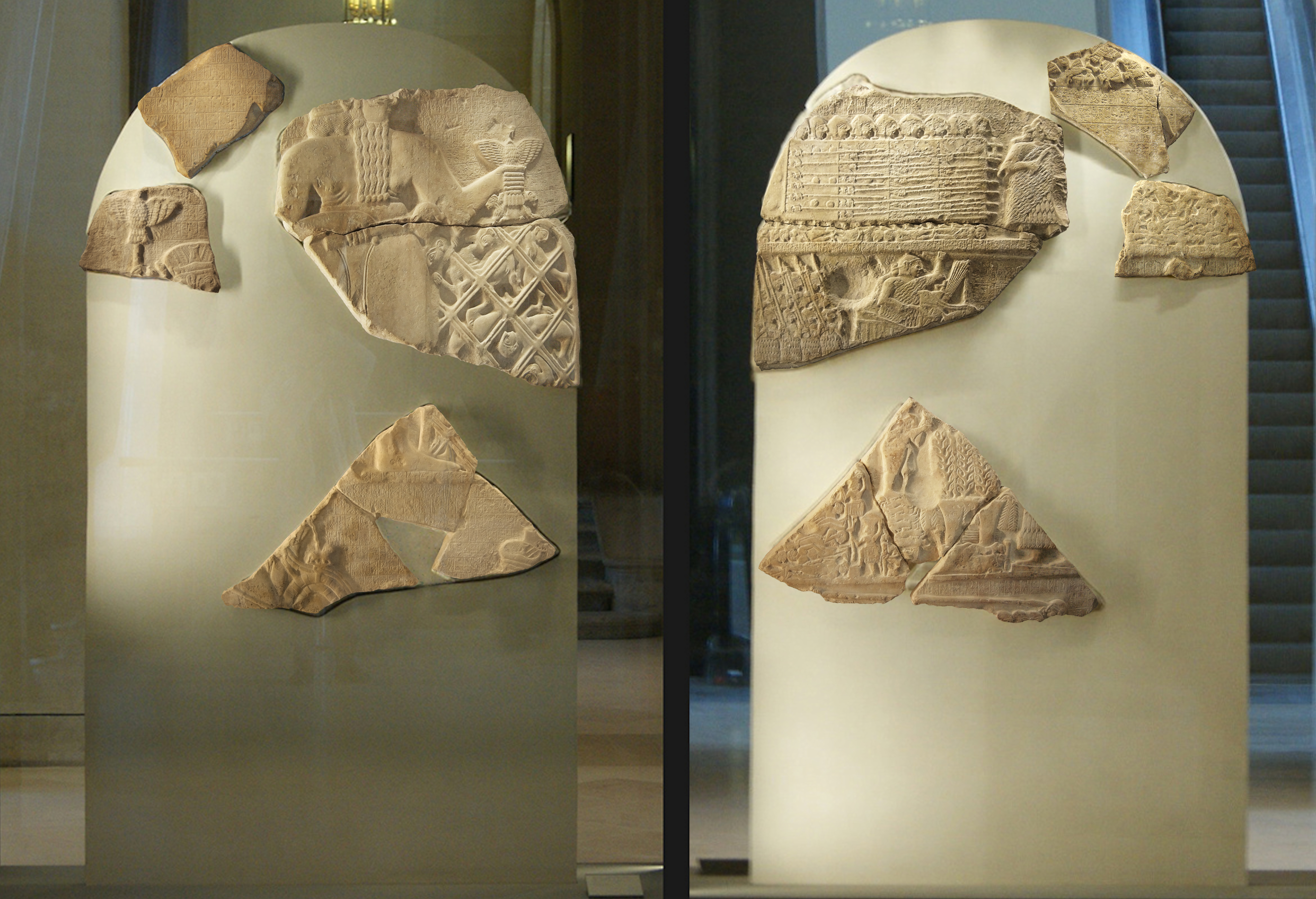
The surviving fragments of the Stele of the Vultures.

While Sin was seemingly not actively worshiped in Early Dynastic Lagash, he appears among the deities invoked in an oath formula on the Stele of the Vultures, as well as in both Sumerian and Akkadian theophoric names identified in sources from this area, such as Amar-Suen and Puzur-Suen. Later on Naram-Sin might have built a temple dedicated to him in nearby Girsu.

In Urum Sin was worshiped in a temple known under the ceremonial name Eablua, "house of teeming cattle". According to Andrew R. George the Edublamaḫ, "house, exalted door socket", which was built in this city by Nāqimum of the Mananā Dynasty near Kish was also dedicated to him.

Akshak was seemingly also regarded as a cult center of Sin, as evidenced by references to a sanga priest of this god residing there, as well as by the theophoric name ^{d}EN.ZU-LUGAL-Akšak^{ki}, "Sin in the king of Akshak".

In Sippar Sin is well documented in sources from the Old Babylonian period, appearing there for the first time on a seal from the reign of the local king Immerum, a contemporary of Sumu-la-El of Babylon. He had a temple in this city, Eidimanna, "house, bond of heaven". However, no references to his cult occur in documents from later periods, and he is only attested again in this city during the reign of Nabonidus. It is not certain if this ruler reintroduced him to the city, or if he only promoted the status of a minor cult which existed there all along but was not referenced directly in available sources. Sin continued to be worshiped in Sippar under Persian rule as well.

In Larsa Sin was worshiped in a temple shared with Ningal in the Old Babylonian period, but no references to him occur in sources from this city from later times.

Sin and Ningal at some point replaced Inanna and Dumuzi as the tutelary deities of Kissig.

==== The Diyala basin ====
Sin played an important role in the Diyala basin, for example in an inscription of Dadusha of Eshnunna enumerating the major deities of his kingdom he is listed directly after Anu and Enlil, which is a position where usually Enki (Ea) would be expected to appear. It is possible that he had a temple in the city of Eshnunna itself, which might be mentioned in a year name of Ibal-pi-el II. Tutub was recognized as his cult center in this area, and excavations indicate that the temple dedicated to him existed in the Jemdat Nasr period already. An en priestess dedicated to him resided in this city, similarly as in Ur. However, the city eventually lost its importance as a cult center of Sin. A further house of worship dedicated to him has been identified during excavations in Tell Ishchali, most likely the site of ancient Nērebtum.

Sin is also the most commonly occurring god in personal names known from tablets from the Chogha Gavaneh site in western Iran, which in the early second millennium BCE was an Akkadian settlement most likely connected to the kingdom of Eshnunna.

==== Assyria ====
While in Babylonia sanctuaries dedicated to Sin were typically located in cities associated with deities regarded as his relatives, for example his father Enlil in the case of Nippur and his daughter Ishtar in Uruk and Babylon, in Assyria they occur mostly in settlements which served as this region's capitals at various points in time. A double temple dedicated jointly to him and Shamash, the Eḫulḫuldirdirra, "house of surpassing joys", existed in Assur. It is not clear if this rarely used ceremonial name was influenced by the better attested Eḫulḫul, referring to the temple in Harran. It was rebuilt by Ashur-nirari I, Tukulti-Ninurta I and Ashurnasirpal II. A similar joint temple existed in Nineveh, as indicated in documents from the reign of Esarhaddon, though its name is presently unknown. Since yet another comparable double sanctuary was located in Dur-Sharrukin, it is possible that the topography of temples of Assur was used as a model for other cities which served as capitals at different points in the history of Assyria.

In the Old Assyrian period Sin was among the Mesopotamian deities most frequently worshiped by the inhabitants of the Old Assyrian trading colony (karum) in Kanesh.

== Mythology ==
Despite his religious importance, Sin only uncommonly appears in myths, especially when compared with his children Ishtar and Shamash.

=== Nanna-Suen's Journey to Nibru ===
The composition Nanna-Suen's journey to Nibru describes the moon god's journey to visit Enlil in his city, Nippur. It is presumed that this composition reflected a festival well attested in literary texts during which a statue of the moon god was transported by boat from Ur to Nippur. After a hymnic prologue praising Nippur, the narrative relays how Sin dispatches his servants to provide him with wood from various areas, including Ebla and Tummal, so that he can have a ship constructed to that end. Once it is finished, he prepares various gifts for Enlil, including cattle, sheep, birds, fish and other animals. He then embarks on his journey. He makes five stops along the way, in each case being welcomed by a local goddess: Ningirida in Enegi, Šerida in Larsa, Inanna in Uruk, Nin-unug in Shuruppak and Ninlil in Tummal, but despite their urging he does not share the cargo meant to be received by Enlil with any of them. After reaching Nippur, he is welcomed by the divine doorkeeper Kalkal, and finally meets Enlil. He requests a blessing for his city, Ur, which he receives in the closing lines of the composition.

=== The Labbu myth ===
Sin plays a prominent role in the Labbu myth. This composition is known only from a single poorly preserved copy from the library of Ashurbanipal. Due to the prominence of Sin and the presence of Tishpak it is possible that it originated in the kingdom of Eshnunna. Wilfred G. Lambert estimated that it was originally composed at some point between 1800 BCE and 800 BCE. Frans Wiggermann favors dating its composition to earlier than 1755 BCE. It deals with the conflict between gods and the eponymous monster. At the sight of Labbu Sin obscures his face with a cloak, which is presumed to reflect a lunar eclipse. Later he advises Tishpak, who has apparently been selected to battle the monster. He is thus responsible for coordinating the slaying of Labbu.

=== Inanna's Descent ===
In Inanna's Descent into the Underworld Ninshubur, the sukkal (attendant deity) of the eponymous goddess, is tasked with petitioning Nanna, as well as Enlil and Enki, in order to prevent her mistress from dying in the underworld. Ninshubur later enters the Ekišnugal to plead with him as instructed, but Nanna refuses to help her. It is presumed that his presence in this myth reflects his well attested role as Inanna's father.

Dina Katz argues that a direct parallel to this passage can be found in the myth Gilgamesh, Enkidu, and the Netherworld and on this basis suggests an intertextual relation between these two compositions. She assumes Inanna's Descent was older and influenced Gilgamesh, Enkidu and the Netherworld, with the opposite possibility being less likely. However, Alhena Gadotti disagrees with Katz's proposal and argues that evidence for a connection between the two texts is lacking, and the passages are not directly parallel as Gilgamesh, Enkidu and the Netherworld notably does not feature Nanna. However, she does point out a similar sequence is present in the composition preserved on tablet XII of the Epic of Gilgamesh.

=== Epic of Gilgamesh ===
In the "Standard Babylonian" edition of the Epic of Gilgamesh some of the grave goods meant to deceased Enkidu are said to be dedicated to Sin, in this passage referred to as Namraṣit. According to Andrew R. George this might reflect the belief that he accompanied the dead when not visible in the sky. A poorly preserved passage in the subsequent section of the epic, which deals with Gilgamesh wandering in the wilderness and mourning Enkidu, might describe the hero killing two lions and dedicating them to Sin in a temple dedicated to him, perhaps after being reassured by the moon god in a dream.

Sin is also mentioned on Tablet XII of the standard edition of the epic, an Akkadian adaptation of Gilgamesh, Enkidu and the Netherworld, which forms a separate narrative. When Enkidu is imprisoned in the underworld, Gilgamesh begs Sin, Enlil and Ea to help him recover his companion, but the first two of these gods refuse.

An unusual variant of the Epic of Gilgamesh replaces the names of the eponymous protagonist and Enkidu with logograms usually used to represent Sin and Ea, ^{d}30 and ^{d}40. Additionally, Ur is referenced in place of Uruk. The reasons behind this are uncertain, as it is difficult to find similarities between the characters of Sin and Ea and the heroes of the Epic of Gilgamesh. The only known tablet was copied at some point between the end of the Old Babylonian period and the beginning of the Middle Babylonian period, possibly in the kingdom of Sealand. The surviving passages correspond to the section of the epic dealing with the "civilizing of Enkidu".

=== Other compositions ===
The Lament for Sumer and Ur, which was inspired by the fall of the Third Dynasty of Ur, describes the impact of a cataclysm which befalls Sin's cult center on him. He asks Enlil to reverse the judgment of the divine assembly which resulted in it, but his request is initially denied. He therefore leaves the city alongside Ningal. He eventually approaches Enlil to request help again, this time receiving a guarantee Ur will be rebuilt. Eventually he and Ningal return to the city.

In the Enūma Eliš the moon god, referred to with the name Nannar, is appointed to his position by Marduk after the defeat of Tiamat. However, in a fragmentary uadi song, his status is described as bestowed upon him by Ninlil. In another tradition, preserved in a text from the reign of Gungunum, his luminosity was bestowed upon him by the so-called "Enki-Ninki deities", a class of ancestral beings from various Mesopotamian theogonies. Another fragmentary composition, dated to the Old Babylonian period, describes the marriage of Sin and Ningal, with Enlil presiding over their wedding. The moon god also appears in a fragmentary text seemingly describing visits of the fire god Gibil in various major temples. Additionally, as noted by Nathan Wasserman, various literary fragments which portray Sin as a god who "enjoys river-side fishing" are known.

== Later influence ==
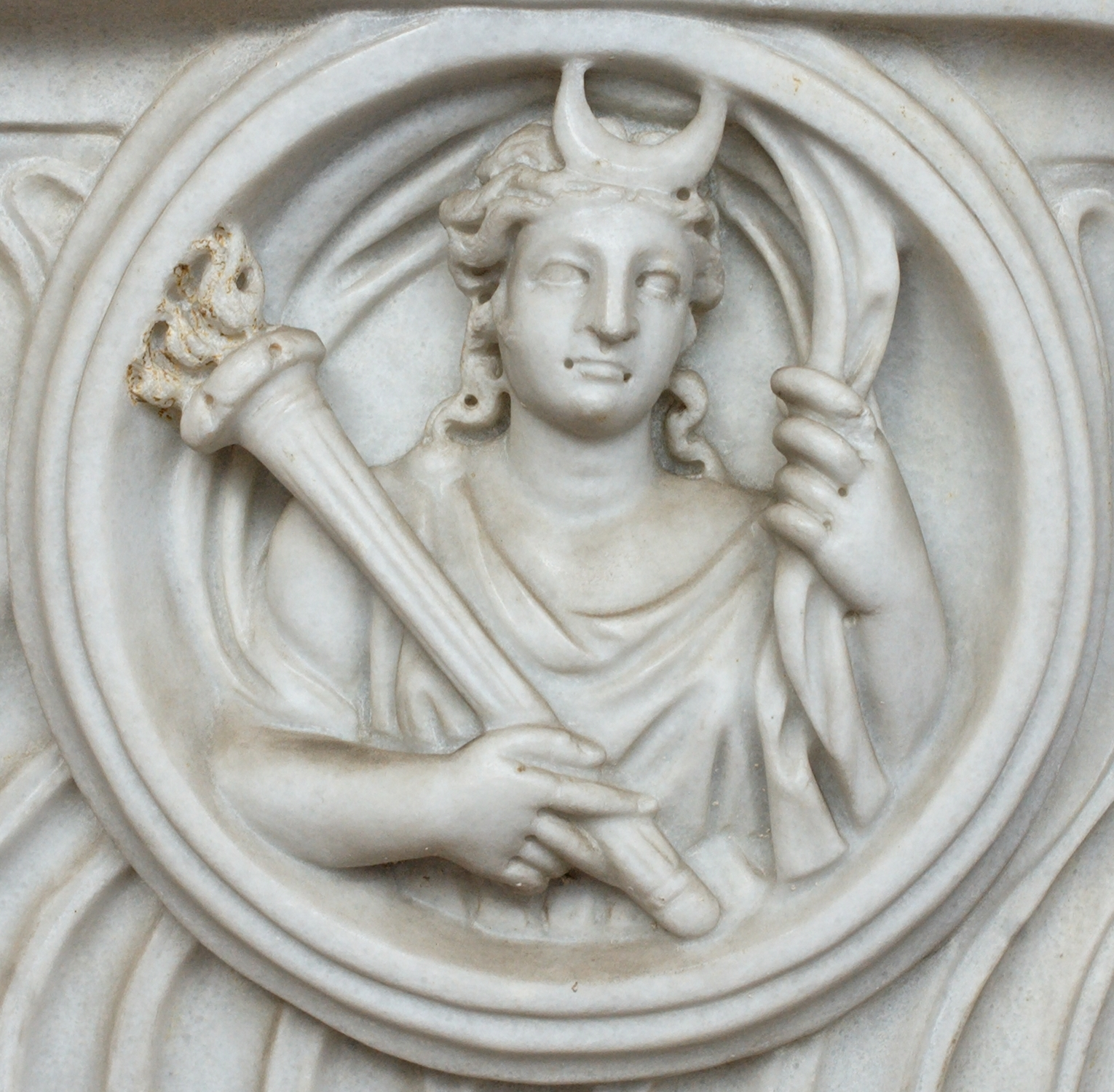
Selene, the Greek goddess of the moon, incorrectly described as the deity worshiped in Harran by Herodian.

Sources postdating the reign of Antigonus I Monophthalmus do not contain much information about the fate of the cult of Sin in Harran, and it remains uncertain how it developed in the last centuries BCE and first two centuries CE, though the official visit of Caracalla in 217 confirms that the city retained a degree of importance. Herodian asserts that this emperor aimed to visit a temple of Selene. However, according to Tamara Green today it is agreed that both this account and Ammianus Marcellinus' reference to Luna as the deity worshiped in Harran, as well as a number of other Greek, Latin and later Arabic sources asserting that a moon goddess being the central deity of this city, are incorrect. The anonymous author of Historia Augusta is a notable exception, correctly referring to the deity of Harran as a male figure, "Lunus".

In Arabic sources the inhabitants of Harran were described as pagan "Sabians" but there are too few reliable accounts of their beliefs to determine to what degree they were a continuation of the cult of Sin known from earlier periods. It has been pointed out that many rituals and deities from late accounts of Harranian religion do not appear to have clear forerunners in earlier sources. Michael Blömer has suggested that the reports of the survival of "pagan" traditions in Harran might have been exaggerated to disparage the city and contrast it with its political rival, Edessa. Medieval sources assert that the fortress located in Harran was originally a Sabian temple, but it is not known if this claim is rooted in historical truth, and furthermore it cannot be ascertained if this hypothetical house of worship was identical with the ancient temple of Sin. The latter was most likely demolished shortly after the visit of Egeria in the city, dated to 383. Local religious traditions of Harran survived the Muslim conquest of the city in 640 and continued to flourish in the subsequent centuries, until it was destroyed by Mongols in 1260. However, while it is agreed that a part of the local population was neither Christian nor Muslim, according to Blömer it should be called into question if their practice reflected the ancient worship of Sin in any meaningful capacity. He notes that unreliable testimonies might have been prioritized in their evaluation due to "the allure of portraying the enigmatic Sabians of medieval Ḫarrān as worshippers of Sîn and the last pagans". He points out inscriptions from the Byzantine period indicate that churches of multiple Christian denominations existed in the city, and suggests already by the time of the Muslim conquest most of its inhabitants were Christians, much like in Edessa or Amida.

References to Sin are also known from Mandaic literature. In Mandaean cosmology, the name for the moon is Sin (ࡎࡉࡍ), which is derived from the name of the corresponding Mesopotamian deity, much like the Mandean names of many other celestial bodies.
