= Alammuš =

Mesopotamian god

- Sukkal of Nanna
- Major cult center: Ur
- Symbol: staff

Genealogy
- Siblings: Ningublaga
- Spouse: Ninurima

Alammuš (Alammush) was a Mesopotamian god. He was the sukkal (attendant deity) of the moon god Nanna, and like him was worshiped in Ur. He was also closely associated with the cattle god Ningublaga, and especially in astronomical texts they could be regarded as twin brothers.

== Name and character ==
Alammuš’s name was often written logographically as ^{d}LÀL (𒀭𒋭) or ^{d}MÙŠ.LÀL, though syllabic spellings are attested too. The Sumerian logogram LÀL resembles that representing the unrelated deity Kabta, leading to occasional confusion between them in scholarship in the past. Frans Wiggermann notes that the name and character of Alammuš (as well as these of other well attested sukkals of major city gods: Ninshubur, Nuska, Bunene and Isimud) do not appear to show direct connection with these of his master, Nanna, which means that he cannot be considered the personification of the effect of the corresponding major deity's actions (unlike sukkals such Nabium, deified flame associated with Girra or Nimgir, deified lightning associated with Ishkur) or a divine personifications of specific commands (unlike such deities as Eturammi, "do not slacken," the sukkal of Birtum). It has been proposed that he was a god connected with food production, as the logogram LÀL used to write his name also meant "honey" or "syrup," and in an offering list from Umma he appears alongside deities associated with grain (Nisaba) and dairy (Nineigara, the wife of Ningublaga, whose name means "lady of the house of butter and cream").

Alammuš could be addressed as a sukkalmaḫ. This term originally denoted an administrative official responsible for managing the duties of sukkals, in this context a class of lower ranked officials responsible for overseeing the implementation of royal orders rather than a type of deity. However, there is no evidence that a divine sukkalmaḫ was in charge of deities regarded as sukkals, and in some cases a deity had multiple sukkals but none of them was referred as a sukkalmaḫ, while in other a sukkalmaḫ was the only sukkal of their master. Most likely addressing a deity as a sukkalmaḫ was only meant to highlight the high position of their master in the pantheon. A text written in the Emesal dialect of Sumerian calls Alammuš "the noble lord of the courtyard," possibly a synonym of his usual title.

Frans Simons instead argues that Alammuš was a god associated with the underworld, pointing at his position in a list deities on the so-called "Land grant to Munnabittu kudurru," where he and Ningublaga occur between the members of two well established groups of underworld deities, Nergal and his entourage and the snake gods Tishpak and Ištaran. He is uncertain if Alammuš and his twin should be regarded as members of one of these two groups, or as unrelated to either despite their postulated character. He also argues that since disappearance of the moon could be connected with the underworld and with funerary offerings, it would be reasonable to assume that some of the courtiers of the moon god would show affinity with this sphere.

The attribute of Alammuš was a staff, which most likely was used to identify sukkals in visual arts.

== Associations with other deities ==
Alammuš was the sukkal (attendant deity, divine vizier) of the Mesopotamian moon god, Nanna (Sin in Akkadian). Manfred Krebernik proposes that he might have been also viewed as one of his sons at an unknown point in time. Alammuš also had a sukkal himself. Two writings of the latter deity's name are known, ^{d}Uru_{3}.gal and ^{d}Uru_{x}(EN).gal. Instances of a deity well established as a sukkal having a sukkal of their own should be regarded as an anomaly according to Richard L. Litke. The other attested case is Niĝgina, a sukkal of the sun god Utu, whose sukkal was Iqbi-damiq.

The goddess Ninurima was regarded as the wife of Alammuš. Her name means "lady of Ur." According to an inscription of Shulgi, she had a temple in Karzida (Ga'eš). At least two instances of Ninuruma receiving offerings alongside her husband are known. She also received offerings of flour on her own. A theophoric name invoking her, Geme-Ninurima, is known from the Ur III period.

Alammuš was commonly associated with the cattle god Ningublaga. They could be regarded as brothers. Early assyriologist Ernst Weidner incorrectly assumed that Ningublaga was a female deity and the wife of Alammuš, which has been disproven by subsequent studies. Together they corresponded to the constellation called "Little Twins" (^{mul}MAŠ.TAB.BA TUR.TUR) in Mesopotamian astronomy. It has been proposed that Little Twins corresponded to Lambda Geminorum and Xi Geminorum. The analogous title "Great Twins" referred to Lugal-irra and Meslamta-ea. Alammuš and Ningublaga also appear together in incantations, ritual texts, and oath formulas.

In the Nippur god list, Alammuš occurs outside the circle of Nanna, next to Lulal. This placement was most likely based on the fact that the sign LÀL was also present in Lulal's name.

== Worship ==
Alammuš was worshiped in Ur. He is also present in offering lists from Umma from the Ur III period. Andrew R. George considers him to be one of the possible identities of the deity worshiped in the temple E-bursasa (Sumerian: "house of the beautiful jars"), though he notes Ningublaga, his wife Nineigara or another presently unidentified deity from the court of Nanna should be considered plausible options too. The same name also referred to part of the temple complex of Shara in Umma and to his temple in Babylon.

An oath sworn by Alammuš, Nanna, Ningal, Ninshubur and other deities which, if broken, was meant to result in infertility is mentioned in a seal inscription of a certain Kussulu. Another inhabitant of Ur, Elali, who was his debtor, was apparently able to raise a family despite breaking the oath, leading Kussulu to implore the same gods again to enforce the contract. Legal texts from the Kingdom of Ḫana mention him alongside deities such as Marduk, Shamash, Annunitum and Adad. One mentions a field which was regarded as property of this god. He is also mentioned in the inscription on a kudurru (boundary stone) from the reign of Marduk-apla-iddina I alongside Ningublaga, as well as a large number of other deities, including Nergal, Ishum, Mammitum, Ištaran and Tishpak. He is also mentioned in an Udug-hul incantation.

Alammuš was worshiped in Uruk in the Seleucid period, though he is absent from earlier sources from the city from the neo-Babylonian period. Julia Krul proposes that his introduction was tied to increased focus on astronomy in local intellectual circles and resulting interest in astral deities, such as Šulpae and the two pairs of "astral twins." He was paired with Ningubalaga during the annual akitu festival of Anu. He is however not attested in personal names or legal texts.

Theophoric names invoking Alammuš are known, one example being Awīl-Alammuš. It is unclear if Early Dynastic names from Ur with the element LÀL, but without a dingir (so-called "divine determinative," a sign which preceded names of deities in cuneiform), should be understood as invoking him.

== Mythology ==
Alammuš appears very rarely in known literary texts. He is mentioned in Lamentation over the Destruction of Sumer and Ur, where it is stated that he "laid down the staff" during the described tumultuous period. Another text, possibly a fragment of a myth about Nanna going on a journey, describes him as "suitable for justice like Utu."
