= Tal Abu Tbeirah =

Archaeological site in Iraq

- Location within Iraq
- 30°59′00″N 46°16′04″E
- Type: settlement
- Periods: Early Dynastic, Akkadian, Ur III
- Location: Dhi Qar Governorate, Iraq

History
- Built: 3rd millennium BC

Site notes
- Excavation dates: 2012-present
- Archaeologists: Franco D'Agostino
- Condition: Ruined
- Owner: Public
- Public access: Yes

Tal Abu Tbeirah is an ancient Near East archaeological site about 7 kilometers south of modern Nasariyah in Dhi Qar Governorate, Iraq, near the Euphrates river and Lake Hammar. It is located 15 about kilometers east of the ancient city of Ur. Remains at the site date mainly to the Early Dynastic, Akkadian, and Ur III periods. The small and now largely destroyed 3rd millennium BC site of Tell Ahaimer lies about 1 kilometer to the northwest. During the occupation period of Tal Abu Tbeirah in the 3rd millennium BC the Persian Gulf extended much further north and the site had a brackish marshy environment. The few cuneiform tablet fragments found so far are too damaged to read. The ancient name of the site is still unknown though Kiabrig, Ĝešbanda/Nišbanda, and Enegi have been suggested.

== Archaeology ==
The site, roughly circular, is about 45 hectares in area with a maximum height of 4.3 meters (north-east sector) and is divided into four sectors by ancient water channels, primarily an ancient canal that passes northwest to southeast and feed the harbor in Area 5. These channels now hold modern roads, one running north to south and the other north-west to south-east. The badly salinized surface has been disturbed by military trenches and pits, graves, and oil and gas exploitation (including a pipeline running north to south through the site). The northwest portion of the site is completely missing due to soil being exploited for industrial use.

In 2008, as part of a program between Italian and Iraqi agencies a short survey of the site was conducted as part of a teaching program with the University of Dhi Qar, resulting in an excavation permit being signed in 2010, in anticipation of future growth in oil exploration and the projected growth of Nasariyah into that area. In 2011 a longer survey was conducted. Since 2012, a joint team of Italian and Iraqi archaeologists led by Franco D'Agostino have been excavating at Tal Abu Tbeirah. In the 1st season three trenches were excavated, mainly to examine a large building in the south-east area seen on imagery. Graves of the Akkadian and late Early Dynastic periods were also excavated. One of the Akkadian period graves (Grave 100), in Area 2, from the middle 3rd millennium BC, was high status based on grave goods. Finds included three bronze vessels, toiletries and three carnelian beads from the Indus Valley. One grave included a complete dog skeleton, a clay boat model, and a jar with a stylized bull-head. The 2nd season, also in 2012, lasted only 23 days due to weather conditions. More graves were examined with a calibrated radiocarbon date of 2470-2295 BC determined for one and 2575-2290 BC for another. Work continued on the structure noted on imagery (Building A), which had three phases, was centered by an 80 square meter courtyard, and was cut by multiple graves. In Phase 1 the courtyard contained a tannur in which were found 3 beakers. Finds there included a copper alloy chisel and a large perforated potter's wheel. In the 2013 season an equid burial was found. DNA analysis showed that the maternal parent was a donkey. The following seasons continued the excavations with most of the focus on southeast sector with the 600 square meter Building A and the graves which cut it (Area 1). In the seventh season Area 6 was opened on highest point on the mound, the northeast sector, by enlarging Iraqi military trenches. Two inscribed half bricks of Ur III ruler Amar-Sin (c. 2046-2037 BC) were found. Area 5 in the northwest, heavily damaged by recent activity, was opened to explore the harbor area. The harbor, with ramparts and docks, had a central basin of 400 square meters and boreholes were made to explore its history.

"Amar-Suena, the one called by name by the god Enlil in Nippur, supporter of the temple of the god Enlil, mighty man, king of Ur, king of the four quarters."

The 8th and 9th (2018 and 2019) seasons focused primarily on geoarchaeology. Excavation did reveal some graves (Area 6) from the early 2nd millennium BC. In one of the graves, looted in antiquity, a light green stone Old Babylonian period seal was found. In area 2 Building B and Building C were found.

After a break due to the pandemic the 11th excavation season at Tal Abu Tbeirah was conducted in 2021/2022.

== History ==
The site was occupied from the Jemdet Nasr period through the Ur III period. Substantial occupation came during the Early Dynastic and Akkadian periods, with a much reduced presence in the Ur III period. The city appears to have been a harbor and trading center associated with Ur in the later half of the 3rd Millennium BC. During these periods the city was about 30 kilometers from the gulf. A small amount of remains from the Old Babylonian period were observed by the excavators.

== See also ==
- Cities of the ancient Near East
