= Enegi =

Lost ancient city in Iraq

Enegi or Enegir was an ancient Mesopotamian city located in present-day Iraq. It is considered lost, though it is known that it was one of the settlements in the southernmost part of lower Mesopotamia, like Larsa, Ur and Eridu. Attempts have been made to identify it with multiple excavated sites. In textual sources, it is well documented as the cult center of the god Ninazu, and in that capacity it was connected to beliefs tied to the underworld. It appears in sources from between the Early Dynastic and Old Babylonian periods. Later on the cult of its tutelary god might have been transferred to Ur.

== Name ==
The earliest attested writing of the toponym Enegi in cuneiform is EN.GI.KI or EN.GI_{4}.KI from the Early Dynastic period, replaced by EN.DIM_{2}.GIG^{ki} in subsequent Sargonic and Ur III sources. A shorter logographic writing, IM^{ki}, is also attested. It occurs in sources from the Old Babylonian period. However, the same logographic writing was also used to represent the names of two other cities, Karkar (the cult center of Ishkur) and Muru (the cult center of Ninkilim). While in the case of Karkar the use of this logogram reflected the writing of the name of its tutelary god as ^{d}IM, it is not known how a similar scribal convention developed in the cases of Enegi and Muru.

It has been proposed that the name of Enegi was connected with the Early Dynastic Sumerian term ki-en-gi, corresponding to the Akkadian phrase māt šumerim, "land of Sumer". Proponents of this view argue that the early name of the southern part of lower Mesopotamia would mean "region of Enegi" and reflect its importance as a religious center associated with the world of the dead and perhaps with burial traditions known from the royal cemetery of Ur, with the connection being forgotten by the end of the Early Dynastic period. However, it is generally agreed that the final element of the term ki-en-gi is identical with that designated by the sign gi_{7} (gir) in words such as emegir, ur-gi_{7} ("dog"), dumu-gi_{7} ("noble", "free citizen") and in the personal name Shulgi, typically translated as "noble" and less commonly as "native".

== Proposed location ==
It is known that Enegi was located in the southernmost part of lower Mesopotamia, in the proximity of cities such as Larsa, Ur and Eridu. Its precise location remains unknown, with early proposals from the 1970s and 1980s including Išan Khaiber, Umm al-Wawiya and Diqdiqah (a mound located 2.4 kilometers away from the ziggurat of Ur). In 2009 Douglas Frayne suggested it was located around 25 kilometers away from Ur (Al-Muqayyir), at the site of modern Mušar. In 2019 Franco D'Agostino and Angela Greco proposed that the recently excavated site of Abu Tbeirah, located 10 kilometers southwest of Nasiriyah, might correspond to Enegi. Material evidence indicates that it flourished roughly between 2450 and 2000 BCE, and that it was an important economic and religious center connected with Ur. D'Agostino and Greco point out that Enegi is the best textually documented city known to have been located in the proximity of the latter city. However, they also stress that the epigraphic evidence from Abu Tbeirah itself is limited, and conclude that certain identification will remain impossible until more texts are uncovered. They consider multiple other lost cities as possibilities as well, including Kiabrig (the cult center of Ningublaga), Ĝešbanda (the cult center of Ningishzida; alternatively identified as Tell Umm al-Dhab near Tell al-'Ubaid), Ga’eš (alternatively identified as Tell Sakhariya) or Aššu.

== Textual attestations ==
Textual sources indicate that Enegi was the cult center of the god Ninazu and his wife Ningirida. Ritual texts, as well as literary compositions such as the Temple Hymns, Lament for Sumer and Ur and the myth Enlil and Ninlil, indicate that a temple dedicated to Ninazu existed there. It bore the ceremonial Sumerian name Egidda (also romanized as Egida), variously translated as "storehouse", "sealed house" or "long house". Due to Ninazu's character as an underworld god, Enegi was associated with the land of the dead, as already attested in sources from the Early Dynastic period. It could be outright compared to it, with the Temple Hymns referring to it as the place where people gather after their deaths. It could also be poetically compared to a type of clay pipe used for funerary libations (a-pa_{4}) designated as a property of Ereshkigal. Furthermore, its association with beliefs centered on the underworld could be highlighted by referring to it as the "Kutha of Sumer", the latter city being regarded as the cult center of Nergal, a god associated with the underworld worshiped further north. Texts addressing Nergal as the god worshiped in the Egidda are known too.

In the Early Dynastic period rulers of Lagash, including Urukagina, apparently showed interest in the cults associated with Enegi, and its tutelary god as a result received offerings in two cities belonging to their kingdom, Girsu and Niĝin. In one case, Ninazu of Enegi is followed in an offering list by Ereshkigal, which constitutes the earliest known reference to this goddess, who is absent from the early god lists from Fara and Abu Salabikh. In the Early Dynastic IIIa period it was included in a list of territories controlled by the city of Uruk under ruler Lumma.

Attestations of Enegi are also available from the Ur III period. The city was under direct control of Ur and retained its religious role. It is presumed that an incantation from the Ur III period addressing Ninazu as the "king of the snakes" originated in Enegi. Ur-Nammu at one point dedicated a marble vase to Gilgamesh (presumably in this context acting as an underworld deity) of Enegi. Frans Wiggermann argues that this dedication, as well as references to the worship of deities such as Ninshubur, Ninsun and Mes-sanga-Unug in Enegi, indicate that its religious traditions were influenced by those of Uruk.

Dina Katz argues that Enegi was destroyed at the end of the Ur III period, relying on the literary account from the Lament for Sumer and Ur. However, Dietz Otto Edzard pointed out that in the Old Babylonian period the city appears in texts from Larsa. Frans Wiggermann states that the attestations are limited to references to prebends, and while they can be considered evidence of the continuous operation of the Egidda in Enegi in the Old Babylonian period, the city and its cults for the most part appear only in literary texts, such as Nanna's Journey to Nippur, which reflect situation in earlier periods.

No references to Enegi occur in sources from the first millennium BCE, but a text from Ur from the reign of Ashurbanipal mentions a temple named Egidda, which according to Paul-Alain Beaulieu might indicate that the cult of Ninazu was eventually transferred to this city from its original center.
