= Ninirigal =

Mesopotamian goddess

- Tutelary goddess of Kullaba
- Major cult center: the Kullaba district of Uruk

Genealogy
- Spouse: Nunbaranna (Gibil)

Ninirigal or Ninirigala was a Mesopotamian goddess associated with Kullaba, a district belonging to the city of Uruk. Her character is poorly known beyond her role as a tutelary goddess of this area. Her husband was a god known under the name Nunbaranna, most likely an epithet of the fire god Gibil.

== Character and worship ==
The theonym Ninirigal can be translated as "lady of the Irigal," Irigal being the name of a temple dedicated to this goddess which existed in Uruk between the late third and early second millennium BCE. She could be referred to as the "mother of Kullaba", but her individual character is poorly defined in known sources.

A goddess named Nin-UNUG who appears in the Early Dynastic Zame Hymns, which describe her as the tutelary deity of Kullaba (also spelled Kullab), a district of Uruk, is sometimes assumed to be Ninirigal, though this remains uncertain and the reading Ninunug is also considered a possibility. If not prefaced by the dingir sign, which functioned as determinative designating names of deities, nin-unug, in this case agreed to mean "the lady of Uruk", was instead an epithet of the incantation goddess Ningirima, as indicated by inscriptions of Lugalzagesi, or Inanna, as attested in a single inscription of Utuhegal.

Ninirigal received offerings in Nippur in the Ur III period, but she is overall sparsely attested after the Early Dynastic period.

According to Julia Krul, it is possible that in the Seleucid period, Ninirigal was "reinvented as protectress of the Irigal". In this context this ceremonial name designated an entirely new temple of Ishtar and Nanaya. It is disputed if the name of the temple should be read as Irigal or Ešgal, though Krul argues the former is more likely Ninirigal is absent from theophoric names and legal texts from Seleucid Uruk, and there is no indication that she was worshiped in this city in the Neo-Babylonian period. Her reintroduction to the pantheon of the city was most likely related to the antiquity and local character of her cult, similar as in the case of Pisangunug.

== Associations with other deities ==
In an Old Babylonian god list considered to be the forerunner of later An = Anum, Ninirigal appears alongside Nunbaranna, a god labeled as her husband, between the sections dedicated to the moon god Nanna and the sun god Utu, but in An = Anum itself both of them appear among the deities associated with craftsmanship in the Enki section instead. The same list equates him and a variant spelling of his name, Nunbaruna, with Gibil/Girra and assigns this deity to Ninrigal as her husband. Based on the use of the name Nunbaranna in incantations it has been suggested that he was simply an epithet of the fire god. Jeremiah Peterson notes that a location associated with Gibil, which in one text is stated to be the place of his birth, was written the same way as the element irigal in Ninirigal's name, AB-gal, and proposes that the theonym and the toponym in mention might be related. He argues that the common assumption that the AB-gal linked to the fire god functions as another writing for a homophonous term referring to the underworld is implausible, and an association with a place linked to his wife fits what is known about both deities better.

Since Ninirigal appears in some of the copies of the myth Nanna-Suen's Journey to Nippur, even though in the standard version Sud is instead present in the same passage, according to Manfred Krebernik it is possible in certain contexts these two deities were conflated. However, he also notes it is not impossible that the inclusion of Ninirigal is only a scribal error.

While it has been argued in early scholarship that Ninirigal was related to or identical with Inanna, no evidence in favor of this theory is available, even though she was also worshiped chiefly in the territory of Uruk. In one ritual text from the same city she appears alongside the medicine goddesses Bau and Gula/Meme.
