= Ningublaga =

Mesopotamian god of cattle

- God of cattle
- Major cult center: Kiabrig

Genealogy
- Siblings: Alammuš
- Spouse: Nineigara

Ningublaga (𒀭𒊩𒌆𒂯, less commonly Ningublag) was a Mesopotamian god associated with cattle. His cult center was Kiabrig, a little known city located in the proximity of Ur. He belonged to the circle of deities related to the moon god, Nanna, and sometimes could be viewed as his son. He is also well attested as the brother of Alammuš, and they frequently appear together in god lists, incantations and especially in astronomical texts.

== Character ==
It is assumed that Ningublaga's name is a genitive construction meaning "lord of Gublag" in Sumerian, Gublag presumably being an otherwise unknown toponym linked with the worship of this god. Two further names which possibly referred to him are GUL-zi (attested in the name of a priestess, reading of the first sign uncertain) and Lugal-baḫar.

Ningublaga was associated with cattle. He was believed to oversee the herds belonging to the moon god Nanna. Consumption of beef was regarded as taboo to him. He also had an apotropaic role, and appears in many incantations, for example against scorpion bite. One of them refers to him as lugal-ḫulĝálra, "lord who fights evil." He could also be referred to as a mašmaš, "incantation priest." This epithet is otherwise rare, and the only other known deities it was applied to were Ninšar (in the text Lipit-Ishtar and the plow) and the unidentified deity ^{d}TU (in an incantation from the Ur III period).

== Associations with other deities ==
Ningublaga was closely associated with the moon god Nanna (Sin), and appears after him and his wife Ningal in most god lists. The great god list An = Anum does not label him as Nanna's son, though the existence of such a tradition is confirmed by other sources. Similarly, it is considered plausible that Ningal was viewed as his mother. However, An = Anum states that his mother was a goddess named ^{d}Áb-na-ar-bu or ^{d}Áb-nir-bu. He was also commonly associated with Alammuš, the sukkal (attendant deity) of Nanna. They could be regarded as brothers. Early assyriologist Ernst Weidner incorrectly assumed that Ningublaga was a female deity and the wife of Alammuš, which has been disproved by subsequent studies. Together they corresponded to the constellation called "Little Twins" (^{mul}MAŠ.TAB.BA TUR.TUR) in Mesopotamian astronomy. It has been proposed that Little Twins corresponded to Lambda Geminorum and Xi Geminorum. The analogous title "Great Twins" referred to Lugal-irra and Meslamta-ea. Alammuš and Ningublaga also appear together in incantations, ritual texts, and oath formulas. Ningublaga's wife was Nineigara. Her temple was the Eigara ("house of butterfat"), but its location is not known and in the so-called Canonical Temple List it was misinterpreted as a temple of her husband.

A neo-Babylonian text refers to two minor goddesses, Mannu-šāninšu and Larsam-iti, as the "Daughters of E-Ningublaga." It is assumed that this name, meaning "house of Ningublaga," refers to his temple in Larsa. Multiple pairs of deities referred to as the "daughters" of a specific temple are known, many of them from northern Mesopotamia. Examples include the Daughters of Ezida (Kanisurra and Gazbaba) from Borsippa, the Daughters of Esagil from Babylon (Katunna and Silluš-tab), the Daughters of Emeslam from Kutha (Tadmuštum and Belet-ili), the Daughters of Edubba from Kish (Iqbi-damiq and Ḫussinni), the Daughters of Ebabbar from Sippar (Mami and Ninegina}), and the Daughters of E-ibbi-Anum from Dilbat (Ipte-bita and Belet-eanni). Further examples are also known from Uruk, Nippur, Eridu in southern Babylonia and Arbela in Assyria. Based on the fact that the goddesses associated with Esagil and Ezida are well attested as members of courts of Zarpanit and Nanaya respectively, specifically as their hairdressers, Andrew R. George concluded that the remaining pairs also were regarded as maidservants in the household of the respective major deity or deities.

In one text, the god Lumma is most likely described as a subordinate of Ningublaga, though a less likely restoration instead places Dumuzi in the role of his superior instead.

Jeremiah Peterson proposes that Numushda was perceived as similar to Ningublaga and for this reason the former also came to be sometimes viewed as a son of Nanna, though he notes no direct equivalence between these two deities is attested in any known god lists.

== Worship ==
Ningublaga's cult center was Kiabrig. His temples there were the Egudušar, "house of multiple perfect oxen," and the Gaburra, "chamber of jars," originally founded by Ur-Nammu. Other sanctuaries of Ningublaga are also known, though their location has yet to be determined. These include the E-bahar ("house of the potter") and the E-nunudda (possibly "princely house, station"). Very little is known about Kiabrig beyond its association with Ningublaga. Literary texts mention in relation to cattle husbandry. It is known that it was located in the proximity of Ur, the cult center of Nanna and Enegi, the cult center of Ninazu. According to Andrew R. George, after the Ur III period Gaburra was likely relocated to Ur, where it was rebuilt first by Warad-Sin and then later by one of the two rulers from the Kassite dynasty bearing the name Kurigalzu (Kurigalzu I or Kurigalzu II). Much like Nanna, he had an entu priestess in this city, who similarly resided in her own gipar building. During the reign of Lipit-Ishtar, this office was held by his daughter Enninsunzi. There is also evidence that in addition to Ur, he was worshiped in Nippur as early as in the Ur III period, and from the Old Babylonian period onward he is attested in Larsa as well.

Ningublaga was worshiped in Uruk in the Seleucid period, though he is absent from earlier sources from the city from the neo-Babylonian period. Julia Krul proposes that his introduction was tied to increased focus on astronomy in local intellectual circles and resulting interest in astral deities, such as Šulpae and the two pairs of "astral twins." He did not have his own temple, but was instead worshiped a cella in one dedicated to Sin. He was paired with Alammuš during the annual akitu festival of Anu. He is not attested in personal names or legal texts.

An inscription on a kudurru (boundary stone) from the reign of Marduk-apla-iddina I (the "land grant to Munnabittu kudurru") mentions Ningublaga alongside a large number of other deities, including Nergal, Laṣ, Bēl-ṣarbi, the pair Lugal-irra and Meslamta-ea, Šubula, Ishum, Mammitum, Ištaran and Tishpak.

A theophoric name invoking Ningublaga, Ur-Ningublaga, is known from documents from the Early Dynastic period and the Ur III period.
