= Nineigara =

Mesopotamian goddess of dairy products

- Goddess of dairy products
- Major cult center: Ur, Kiabrig, Šadunni

Genealogy
- Spouse: Ningublaga

Nineigara (also romanized as Nine'igara) was a Mesopotamian goddess associated with dairy products. She was regarded as the wife of the god of cattle, Ningublaga, and like him belonged to the court of the moon god Nanna.

== Name and character ==
Nineigara's name can be translated from Sumerian as "lady of the house of butter and cream." On this basis, it is assumed that she was regarded as the goddess of dairy products. By extension, she might have been associated with cattle. It has been suggested that she was depicted seated on a throne, with cattle horns, holding emblems depicting cow and sheep, as reflected by references to these objects in a passage focused on her in the Lament for Sumer and Ur.

== Associations with other deities ==
Ningublaga was regarded as Nineigara's husband. They appear as a pair in the Lament for Sumer and Ur, where the she laments this departure and the destruction of their home. They are also invoked together in the ḫulbazizi incantations known from copies from Assur and Nineveh. Furthermore, they are juxtaposed in multiple god lists, including An = Anum and its Old Babylonian forerunner, as well as the Mari god list.

Based on Nineigara's connection to Ningubaga it is presumed that like him she belonged to the court of the moon god Sin. Multiple deities associated with cattle belonged to it, which reflects his association with herding, especially pronounced in the traditions of Ur. According to Jeremy Black, Nineigara functioned as the divine housekeeper of his temple Ekišnugal. Aino Hätinen notes that an incantation assigns various administrative roles in the household of Sin to her, including these of an "obedient housekeeper" (Sumerian munus-agrig šu-dim_{4}-ma, Akkadian abarakkatu saniqtu), but also of the "lady of the treasury" (Sumerian nin-èrim, Akkadian bēlet išitti).

== Worship ==
Nineigara was worshiped in a temple bearing the ceremonial name Eigara, "house of butterfat". Its location is presently unknown. It might have served as storage for various dairy products. The Canonical Temple List erroneously attributes it to Ningublaga instead. A temple dairy located in Girsu bore the same name. Nineigara was also worshiped in the main temple of her husband, Egaburra, "house of bur jars", located in Kiabrig. An unpublished hymn indicates that she also had a temple in Šadunni which was named Egainunšaršar, "house which provides a profusion of milk and ghee". According to Andrew R. George, it is also likely that one of the temples bearing the name Ebursasa, "house of beautiful jars", was dedicated to a courtier of the moon god, with Nineigara, Ningublaga and Alammuš all being plausible candidates for this role. This Ebursasa should not be confused with two other houses of worship sharing its name, located in Umma and in Babylon, both of which were dedicated to Shara.

Many offering lists from Ur from the Ur III period mention Nineigara. She appears in one of them alongside Ningublaga and Alammuš. She is also grouped with the latter god and Nisaba in a number of similar documents, possibly based on their shares association with food: Nisaba was associated with grain, while a connection with syrup has been proposed for Alammuš.

An inscription of king Lipit-Ishtar of Isin dealing with the installation of his daughter Enninsunzi as the en priestess of Ningublaga in Ur mentions that her new position will make her the "true stewardess" of Nineigara as well.

While most attestations of Nineigara come from the third and second millennia BCE, literary texts from the first millennium BCE still refer to her as one of the deities connected with the religious traditions of Ur.
