= Gibil =

Mesopotamian god of fire

- God of fire
- Other names: Girra, Mubarra
- Major cult center: Shuruppak, Eridu (disputed), Nippur
- Abode: Irigal
- Symbol: torch

Genealogy
- Spouse: Ninirigal

Gibil (𒀭𒉈𒄀), also known under the Akkadian name Girra, was a Mesopotamian god associated with fire, both in its positive and negative aspects. He also played a role in ritual purification. Textual sources indicate his symbol was a torch, though no representations of him have been identified in Mesopotamian art. Multiple genealogies could be assigned to him. The god list An = Anum indicates his spouse was Ninirigal. He was also frequently associated with deities such as Shamash, Nuska and Kusu. He is first attested in Early Dynastic texts from Shuruppak, such as offering lists. He was also a member of the pantheon of Eridu. In the Kassite period he was worshiped in Nippur. Later attestations are available from Assyria and from Uruk. He also appears in a number of literary texts.

== Names ==
Gibil (^{d}gibil_{6}) is considered the conventional reading of a theonym written in cuneiform as ^{d}NE.GI (variant: ^{d}GI.NE), though Jeremiah Peterson notes that it has yet to be fully verified by primary sources. Ryan D. Winters also stresses lack of direct evidence for the reading Gibil, despite its conventional status in Assyriological literature. Manfred Krebernik and Jan Lisman similarly conclude that despite being commonly used in scholarship, the reading Gibil, in contrast with Girra, is not securely supported by primary sources. Peterson suggests that it is not impossible that ^{d}NE.GI was instead read as ^{d}gira_{x}^{gi}, which would presumably reflect derivation from the Akkadian word girru, "fire". The Akkadian form Girra was derived directly from the term girru. These terms are ultimately derived from the root *ḥrr, "to burn" or "to scorch", similarly as another theonym, Erra. Jeremy Black and Anthony Green treat names Gibil and Girra as referring to the same deity. Johanna Tudeau argues that they were initially separate, but came to be fully merged with each other either in the Old Babylonian period or shortly after it, with later sources such as Assyrian copies of the Weidner god list indicating they were used interchangeably to refer to one figure. Gebhard J. Selz describes Gibil and Girra as already analogous to each other in the context of the text corpus from Lagash from the Early Dynastic period. Instances of ^{d}GIBIL_{6} being used as a logogram meant to be read as Girra are known from astronomical texts. A further attested writing of the theonym Gibil is ^{d}GIŠ.BAR. Selz argues that originally it referred to a distinct god, Gišbar or Gišbarra, attested in theophoric names such as Ur-Gišbar-izipae from the Ur III period and later conflated with Gibil.

In Emesal texts, Gibil was referred to with the variant name Mubarra. Additional names or epithets attributed to him include Nunbaranna (or Nunbaruna; translation uncertain), known from the god list An = Anum (tablet II, line 337), its Old Babylonian forerunner and a number of incantations from the same period; Nunbarḫada ("prince with a burning white body"; An = Anum, tablet II, line 339), and Nunbarḫuš ("prince with a glowing body", present both in the An = Anum forerunner and in An = Anum, tablet II, line 340). Piotr Michalowski notes that the last of these names also appears as a synonym of the term ziqtu, "torch", in lexical lists from the first millennium BCE.

The name Gibil was also used as a designation for a star in the Old Babylonian period, though its identification remains uncertain and is complicated by late astronomical text treating it as synonymous with the planet Mars.

== Character ==
Gibil was the god of fire. He could represent this element in its positive aspect, for example in association with furnaces and kilns, and in this context could be treated as a tutelary deity of metallurgists. However, he also represented fire as a cause of destruction. A namburbi, a type of ritual text focused on warding off the negative consequences of specific omens, documents that it was believed that situations in which houses were set on fire by a lightning strike were considered a display of Gibil's wrath. He could be also blamed for the burning of fields. As indicated by the incantation series Maqlû and Šurpu, a further function of the fire god was warding off malevolent magic and unlucky events foretold by nightmares. He additionally played a role in ritual purification. It has been argued that this was his main function in the sphere of cult.

While textual sources indicate that Gibil's symbol was a torch, no iconographic representations of him have been identified.

== Associations with other deities ==
=== Family and court ===
Piotr Michalowski argues that the beliefs about the origin of Gibil reflected his proposed association with the city of Eridu, as he could be considered "the son of the Abzu". According to another tradition his father was Enlil, as documented in an Old Babylonian Akkadian source (tablet BM 29383) and possibly in a Sumerian literary text from the same period. Maqlû instead calls him a "scion" of Anu (tablet II, line 77). The same series of incantations also refers to him as offspring of Shalash (tablet II, line 137), though a copy where Shala occurs instead in the same passage has been discovered too. References to Nuska as his father are known as well.

The god list An = Anum (tablet II, line 341) indicates that the goddess Ninirigal could be considered the spouse of Gibil. It is not certain if they were already regarded as a couple in earlier periods. The same text states that his divine attendant (sukkal) was Nablum (tablet II, line 342), "flame", who might have been linked to him due to being a divine representation of the effects of his activity, similarly to how the weather god Ishkur's sukkal was Nimgir, "lightning". Furthermore, it assigns him two counselors, the divine representations of a torch (^{d}níg.na) and a censer (^{d}gi.izi.lá).

=== Other associations ===
As already attested in an Ur III text from Nippur, Gibil was connected with the sun god Shamash (Utu), who according to Piotr Michalowski was the deity he was most commonly linked to in Mesopotamian tradition. Jeremiah Peterson proposes that the connection between the two was related to the belief documented in Maqlû, according to which in some rituals, possibly these which took place during the month Abu, the fire god was believed to take the place of the sun god at night. He was commonly described as his "friend" or "companion" (Akkadian tappû).

Gibil was also closely associated with Nuska. They are attested together in Old Babylonian seal inscriptions from Sippar. He also appears after Nuska and his wife Sadarnunna in the Weidner god list, and he is explicitly linked to the former of these two deities in a boundary stone inscription from the reign of Nazi-Maruttash. Andrew R. George notes that he could effectively function as an "agent" of Nuska. However, the two could be identified with each other as well, which led to the development of a tradition in which Nuska, normally associated with Enlil, was instead portrayed as a son or attendant of Anu.

In late commentaries on religious texts, Gibil was often paired with Kusu, a purification deity associated with censers. Both of them could be grouped into a triad with Ningirima, a deity who also belonged to the sphere of ritual purification.

== Worship ==
Gibil is relatively sparsely attested in Mesopotamian texts, though he nonetheless is known from sources from various time periods and locations. Most of the evidence postdates the third millennium BCE.

The oldest references to Gibil occur in texts from Early Dynastic Shuruppak (Fara), where he might have been a relatively important deity, as in offering lists he occurs alongside the major members of the local pantheon. Additionally, the forty-third of the Zame Hymns is dedicated to him. (Note: Krebernik and Lisman tentatively suggest reading the logogram ^{d}NE.GI as Girra in their edition of the Zame Hymns.) This text has been discovered in Abu Salabikh. Piotr Michalowski argues that his cult center in this composition is Eridu. An association between him and this city is also accepted by Julia Krul. However, Manfred Krebernik and Jan Lisman instead translate the line describing Gibil's cult center as "NE.GI, pure place of the prince" (NE.GI nun ki). They consider it implausible that Eridu (NUN^{ki}) is meant instead. They point out that NE.GI is likely to be a logographic spelling of the name of an unknown city due to the widespread phenomenon of the same logograms designating both a deity and the corresponding cult center, attested as well for example for Sud and Shuruppak or Enlil and Nippur. Jeremiah Peterson additionally suggests that like his spouse Ninirigal, he might have been associated with Uruk and Kullaba.

In sources from Lagash from the Early Dynastic period, Gibil is only attested in a single theophoric name, Ur-Gibil. In Adab, he occurs in a single Old Akkadian offering list and in a number of theophoric names, such as Geme-Gibil and Ur-Gibil.

Only a single house of worship associated with Gibil is known. Under the name Girra, he was worshiped in the Emelamḫuš ("house of awesome radiance"), the temple of Nuska in Nippur, as attested in the Canonical Temple List, dated to the Kassite period. Two theophoric names invoking him appear in texts from this city from the same period. He also appears in Assyrian tākultu texts as a member of a group of deities associated with Shamash.

Late attestations of the fire god are known from Seleucid texts from Uruk, though he was not yet worshiped there in the Neo-Babylonian period. Most likely similarly as in the case of Kusu and Kusibanda, his introduction to the local pantheon reflected his role in craftsmanship and his importance in the eyes of āšipu and kalû clergy. Despite being actively worshiped, he is absent from legal texts, and no theophoric names invoking him are attested.

== Literature ==
=== The Gibil imgida ===
An imgida text focused on Gibil has been identified by Jeremiah Peterson on a fragmentary tablet from Old Babylonian Nippur. Due to its state of preservation much about its plot remains uncertain, though based on the surviving sections it can be established that it described his birth in a place referred to as AB-gal, to be read as either iri_{12}-gal or eš_{3}-gal. This location is also described as his dwelling in other sources. Peterson chooses to render it as Irigal in his translation. He argues that the temple of Gibil's spouse Ninirigal in Uruk is meant, rather than the underworld, as while the latter location could be referred to with the term irigal, (Note: This designation might be the source of later term Irkalla, which is first attested in the Middle Assyrian period.) it was typically written as AB✕GAL^{(GAL)}, AB-gunû^{(GAL)} or IRI-GAL, as opposed to AB-gal, in contrast with the theonym Ninirigal, consistently spelled ^{d}nin-AB-gal from the Ur III period onward. As an alternative he proposes that the term ešgal might be used instead, as it could be a designation of many temples, for example Ekur. The view that the Irigal associated with Gibil is to be understood as the underworld has originally been formulated by Piotr Michalowski. Another passage of the imgida describes Gibil joining the moon god, Nanna, in the sky in the evening. He is apparently responsible for providing light during the night alongside him. It is possible that the rest of the text originally described his visits to the cult centers of others gods, as a fragment mentions Enlil and his temple Ekur, where Gibil apparently had to purify an oven, while in another references to Inanna and the city of Zabalam occur.

=== Girra and Elamatum ===
A fragment of a myth focused on Girra, provisionally referred to as The Myth of Girra and Elamatum in absence of any references to its original title, is preserved on an Old Babylonian tablet from either Sippar or nearby Tell ed-Der (BM 78962), though based on the colophon the surviving fragments only represent the seventh part of a longer multi-tablet sequence, which might have originally consisted of a total of around three hundred and fifty lines. The initial lines are not possible to decipher, but the first passage describes Enlil proclaiming the destiny decreed for Girra after his defeat of Elamatum ("the Elamite woman"), possibly either a supernatural representation of Elam as a geopolitical rival of Mesopotamian states or a personification of famine, illness or sorcery, with the last of these interpretations possibly supported by the fire god's common role as a deity countering it in incantations. Her remains are apparently turned into an object visible in the sky. The name appears as a designation of an unidentified group of stars in an Old Babylonian prayer among many better attested constellations, but it is absent from later compendiums of Mesopotamian astronomy. It is to be distinguished from the "Star of Elam" (MUL.ELAM.MA^{ki}) identified with Mars. Christopher Walker notes that parallels can be drawn between the surviving section of this myth and the celebration of Ninurta's victory in compositions such as Lugal-e or Marduk's in Enūma Eliš.

=== Other literary texts ===
In the Lament for Sumer and Ur, Gibil is mentioned among the causes of destruction described in this composition. He is apparently responsible for setting fire to reeds. As noted by Nili Samet, a direct parallel to the passage describing this is present in the myth Inanna and Ebiḫ, where the eponymous goddess threatens that she will tell Gibil to perform the same action.

In the Epic of Anzû, Girra is one of the three gods who refuse to fight the eponymous creature to recover the Tablets of Destiny, the other two being Shara and Adad.

In the Enūma Eliš, Gibil is the forty sixth of the names bestowed upon Marduk after the defeat of Tiamat. (Note: Wilfred G. Lambert renders the name as Girra instead in his translation.) The function attributed to Marduk under this name might be "who makes weapons hard", possibly a reference to the fire god's role in metallurgy, but the passage is unclear.

A literary text dealing with Shalmaneser III's campaign in Urartu mentions Girra in passing as one of the two gods who accompanied this king, the other being Nergal.
