= Brine spring =

A brine spring or salt spring is a saltwater spring.

Brine springs are not necessarily associated with halite deposits in the immediate vicinity. They may occur at valley bottoms made of clay and gravel which became soggy with brine seeped downslope from the valley sides.

Historically, brine springs have been early sources of U.S. salt production, as in the case of the salterns in Syracuse, New York and at the Illinois Salines.

== See also ==
- Saline seep
- Salt lick
- Mineral spring
