= Nimintabba =

Goddess in Sumerian mythology

Nimintabba

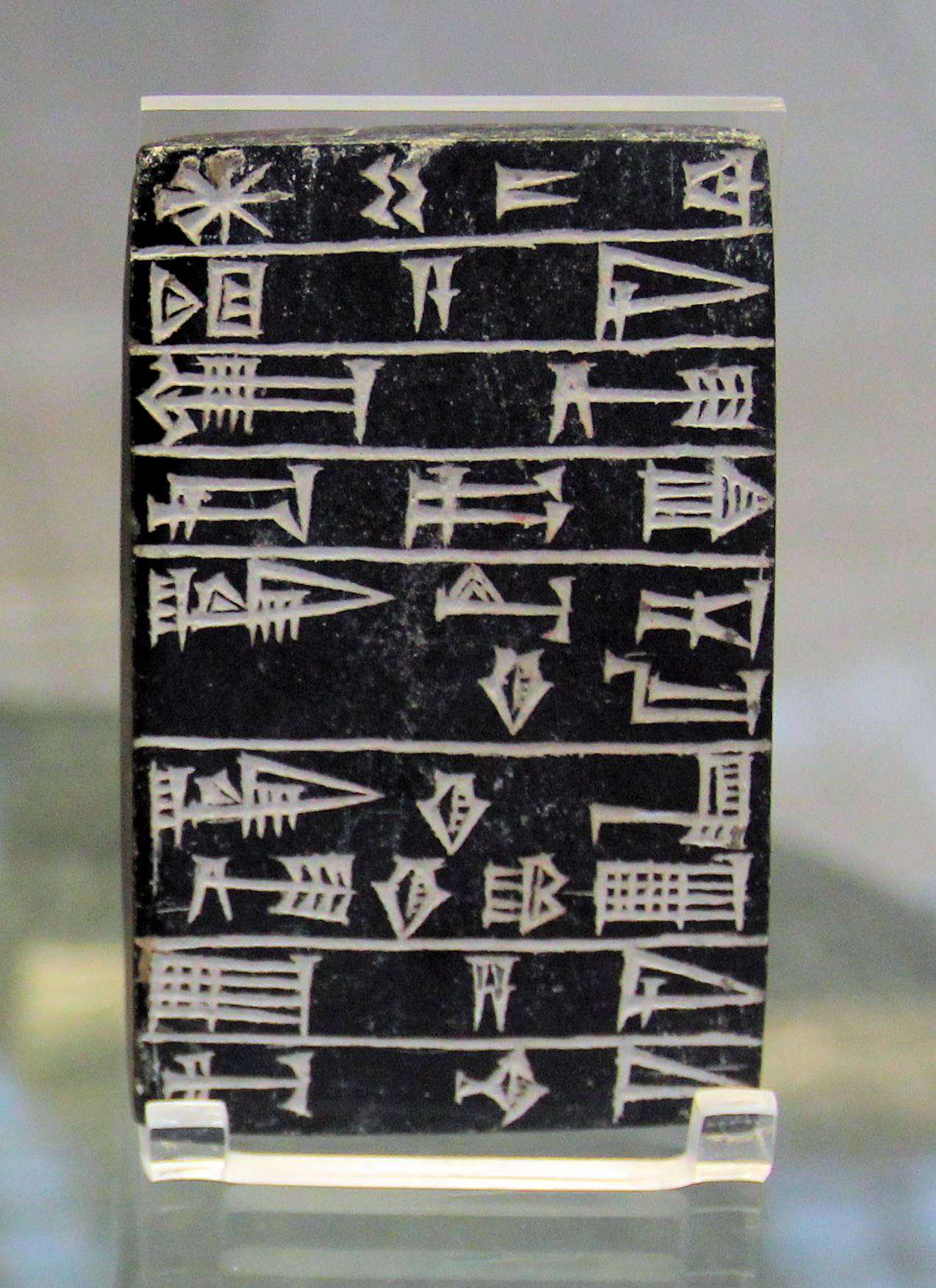
𒀭𒐏𒋰𒁀
𒎏𒀀𒉌
𒂄𒄀
𒍑𒆗𒂵
𒈗𒋀𒀊𒆠𒈠
𒈗𒆠𒂗
𒄀𒆠𒌵𒆤
𒂍𒀀𒉌
𒈬𒈾𒆕

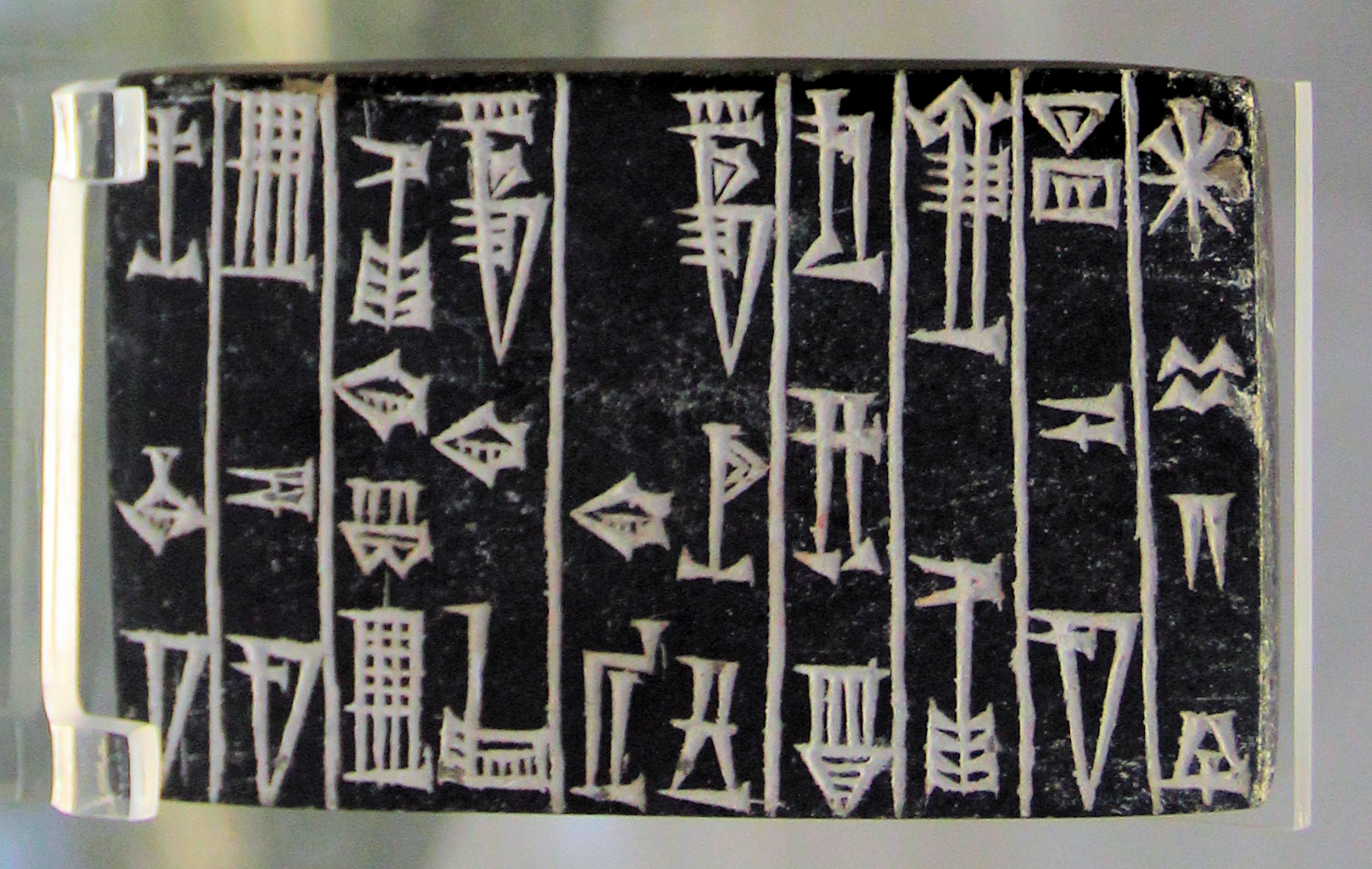
^{D}Nimintabba.............. "For Nimintabba"
NIN-a-ni..................... "his Lady,"
SHUL-GI.................... "Shulgi"
NITAH KALAG ga...... "the mighty man"
LUGAL URIM KI ma... "King of Ur"
LUGAL ki en............... "King of Sumer"
gi ki URI ke................. "and Akkad,"
E a ni.......................... "her Temple"
mu na DU................... "he built"

Foundation tablet of king Shulgi (c. 2094–2047 BC), for the Temple of Nimintabba in Ur. ME 118560 British Museum. Inscription "For his Lady Nimintabba, Shulgi the mighty man, King of Ur and King of Sumer and Akkad, has built her Temple": The traditional orientation is vertical, but modern transcription is based on the rotated script.
Location of the Nimintabba Temple in Ur.

Nimintabba (𒀭𒐏𒋰𒁀 ^{D}Nimin-tab-ba, previously read Dimtabba) was a Goddess of Sumer. She is thought to have been a local deity of the city of Ur, as her only known temple was located there. Her worship was particularly associated with king Shulgi (reigned c. 2094 – c. 2046 BC), and there are no previous attestations of her.

== Attestations ==
A Temple was built for her at Ur by the Sumerian king Shulgi, circa 2100 BCE. The remains of the Temple were excavated in Ur by Wolley. Various artifacts with the name Nimintabba were found in the vicinity of the Temple. She seems to have been a rather minor, local deity.

Nimintabba is also known from a famous dedicatory inscription by Shulgi, found in the foundation of the Nimintabba Temple of Ur, and now in the British Museum (ME 118560).

A foundation figurine was also found under the northeastern wall of Temple of the Goddess Nimintabba, encased within baked brick boxes, and accompanied by steatite tablets, with the figurine positioned standing and leaning north east. The steatite tablets rested on the bottom of the sealed box. The male figurine represents the king Shulgi, a connection provided by the historical implication of the figure's posture. The posture of the figurine replicates the posture associated with royal iconography established in the mid-third millennium BCE. The basket atop the head of the figurine also resembles images of Assurbanipal (686-627 BCE) with a basket on top of his head. Inscriptions connect this image with the construction of the temple. These pieces of evidence combined with the inscription on the lower half of the figures contribute to the probability that the figurine under the Temple of the Goddess Nimintabba was a dedication to Nimintabba by Shulgi, claiming responsibility for the construction of the temple.

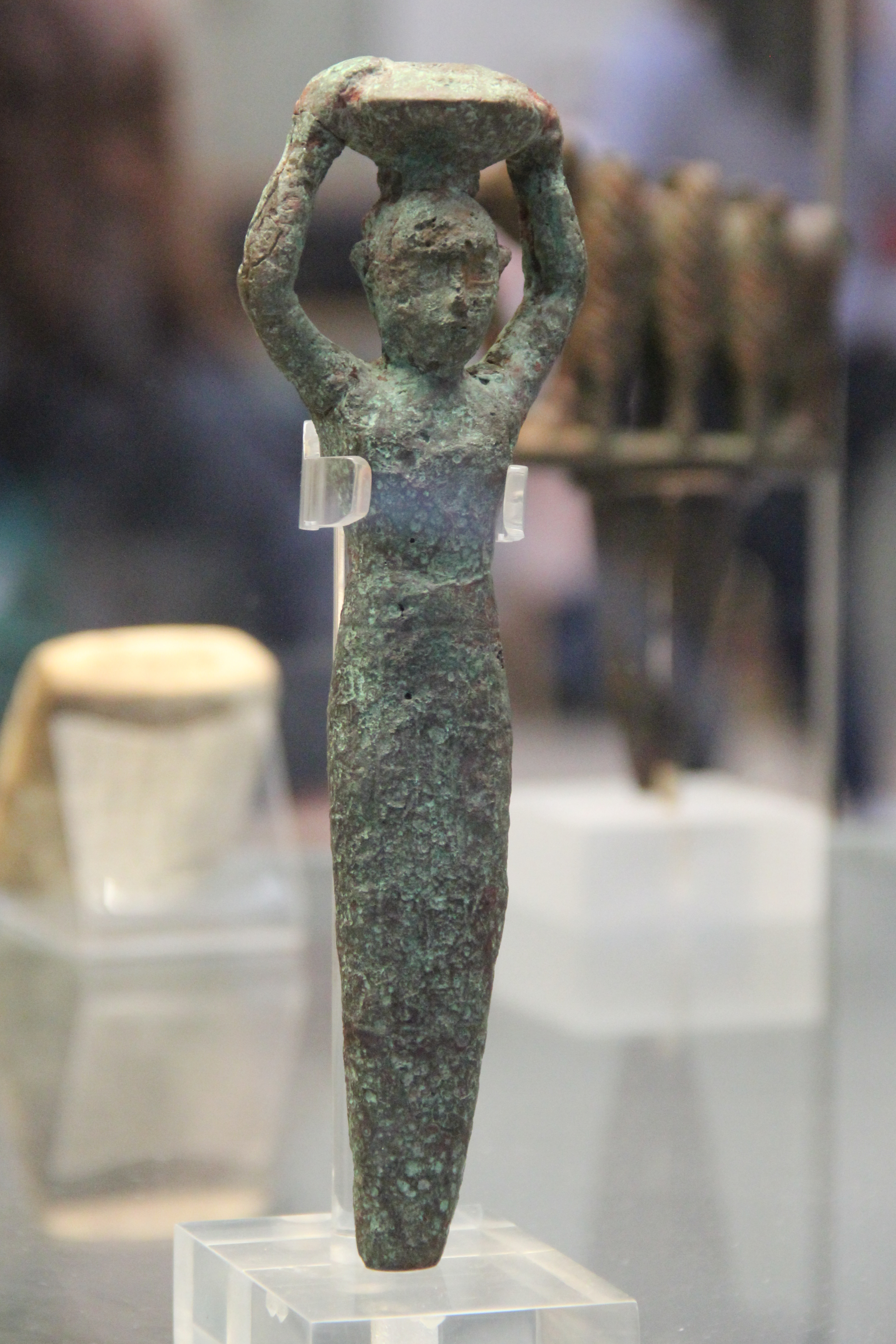
Bronze foundation figurine of Shulgi from the Temple of Nimintabba at Ur.

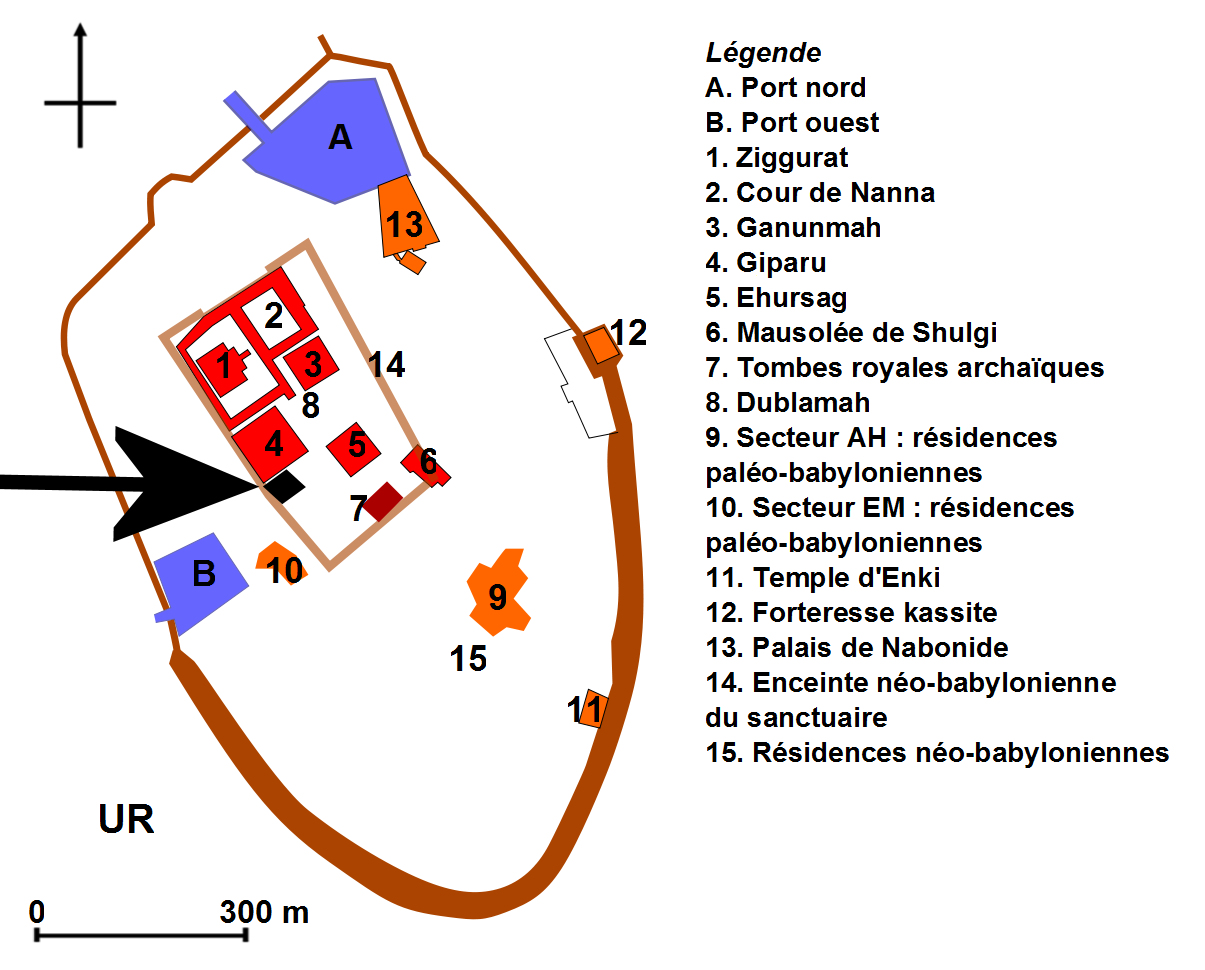
Location of Nimintabba Temple at Ur.
