= Šubula =

Minor Mesopotamian underworld god

- Underworld god
- Major cult center: Ṣupur-Šubula

Genealogy
- Spouse: Tadmuštum

Equivalents
- Amorite: Ġalamu

Šubula (Shubula) was a Mesopotamian god. He was associated with the underworld, and commonly appears in association with Nergal, Ishum, Laṣ and other deities of similar character. He was worshiped in small settlements such as Ṣupur-Šubula and Lagaba, likely located in the proximity of Kutha, but also in Susa and Uruk.

== Character ==
Šubula was a minor god. It is assumed that the name is etymologically connected with the Akkadian word ābalu(m), "to dry" or "to be dry." A less likely proposal instead derives it from wābalu(m), "to carry." He was most likely associated with the underworld. In known sources he is often mentioned alongside other gods of the underworld. In an offering list from Puzrish-Dagan from the Ur III period concerned with rites of Kutha he appears alongside Tadmuštum, Laṣ and Meslamtaea. On a kudurru (boundary stone) of Marduk-apla-iddina I (the "land grant to Munnabittu kudurru") he appears alongside Nergal, his wife Laṣ, Šar-ṣarbati, the pair Lugal-irra and Meslamta-ea and Mammitum. This is the only known kudurru inscription mentioning him, and he appears on the thirty third place among the deities invoked. In Šurpu he appears alongside Nergal, Ishum and Šar-ṣarbati (Bēl-ṣarbi). In the Nippur god list, he appears after Nergal and Mammitum.

== Associations with other deities ==
Many researchers assume that Šubula was Nergal's son. Among the supporters of this interpretation are Andrew R. George, Frans Wiggermann and Julia Krul. It has been argued that such a connection could be a reflection of the location of his cult center, Ṣupur-Šubula, in the proximity of Nergal's city, Kutha. However, as noted by Jeremiah Peterson, it is unclear if the god list An = Anum, usually used to support this theory, recognizes him as Nergal's son, as the corresponding section contains a lacuna. Another possible restoration would instead make him the son of Ishum. Those two gods appear together very commonly in known sources, but the nature of the connection between them is not certain. In one text, Ishum and Šubula are called the "gods of Tigris and Euphrates."

According to the god list An = Anum, Šubula's wife was Tadmuštum, who was also an underworld deity.

In a bilingual Akkadian-Amorite lexical list dated to the Old Babylonian period, Šubula's Amorite counterpart was Ġalamu (ḫa-la-mu), whose name is presumed to be a cognate of Ugaritic ġlm, literally "boy, youth", but as an epithet also metaphorically "the noble". Presumably this figure was a minor deity in the Amorite pantheon. A connection with Ḫalmu and Ḫalamu, a pair of sparsely attested primordial ancestral deities known from the lexical list Diri from Old Babylonian Nippur, has been ruled out.

== Worship ==
In the Reallexikon der Assyriologie und Vorderasiatischen Archäologie, Piotr Michalowski describes Šubula as "known only from Ur III and early Isin sources", but more recent publications show that he is also attested in documents from later periods. He was still worshiped under the rule of the Seleucid Empire in the late first millennium BCE.

The village Ṣupur-Šubula, located near Kutha, was a cult center of Šubula, and a temple dedicated to him was located in it. Locally he was invoked in oath formulas alongside Shamash and Marduk. According to documents from the archive of Ubarum, a soldier who lived in Ṣupur-Šubula in the Old Babylonian period, the temple served as a place for signing contracts and resolving legal disputes for the local community. There is also evidence that it was responsible for collecting taxes from the inhabitants on behalf of the ruler. He was also worshiped in Lagaba, a small town located in northern Babylonia known only from records from the reigns of Hammurabi and Samsu-iluna. It is possible that it was also located near Kutha, as deities worshiped in the later settlement, such as Laṣ, appear in theophoric names from Lagaba. A temple of Šubula is also mentioned in the so-called Canonical Temple List, but its name and location are lost. A feast of Šubula is mentioned in a document from Old Babylonian Sippar.

In Seleucid Uruk, Šubula was worshiped during the akītu festival alongside Nergal. However, he is absent from legal texts and no theophoric names invoke him. There is also no evidence that he was worshiped there in the neo-Babylonian period. Julia Krul proposes that he was only introduced to the pantheon of the city late and entirely due to his connection with Nergal, similar to Ishum and the Sebitti.

Šubula is attested as a family deity in cylinder seal inscriptions. A single reference to an unknown individual making his subordinates swear an oath by Šubula because he was his family god is known. He appears in both Sumerian and Akkadian theophoric names, such as Šu-Šubula and Ur-Šubula. One man bearing the latter name was a high-ranking official during the reign of Ishbi-Erra of Isin. It is also present in model contracts which formed a part of scribal school curriculum in Old Babylonian Nippur. Two theophoric names invoking Šubula are also known from documents from this city from the Kassite period.

=== Outside Mesopotamia ===
Theophoric names attested in administrative documents indicate Šubula was also worshiped in Susa in Elam in the Old Babylonian period. One known example of an Elamite theophoric name invoking him is Kuk-Šubula. Ran Zadok proposes that like many other Mesopotamian deities worshiped in this city, he might have been introduced there from the "trans-Tigridian" or Sealand regions of Mesopotamia.
