= Ugur (god) =

Mesopotamian god

- Sukkal of Nergal, war god
- Major cult center: Isin, Girsu
- Successor: Ishum

Genealogy
- Spouse: Šī-šarrat

Ugur was a Mesopotamian god associated with war and death, originally regarded as an attendant deity (sukkal) of Nergal. After the Old Babylonian period he was replaced in this role by Ishum, and in the Middle Babylonian period his name started to function as a logogram representing Nergal. Temples dedicated to him existed in Isin and Girsu. He was also worshiped outside Mesopotamia by Hurrians and Hittites. He might also be attested in sources from Emar.

== Name and character ==
Ugur's name was written in cuneiform as ^{d}U.GUR. It is alternatively romanized as Uqur or Ukur. Jeremiah Peterson notes that an Old Babylonian exemplar of the Weidner god list appears to preserve a variant spelling, ^{d}U.GU_{2}, which supports the reading Ugur. A bilingual god list from Emar phonetically transcribes it in Hurrian as ^{d}u-ku-ur-un. According to Manfred Krebernik and Volkert Haas its origin and meaning are not fully certain. It has been proposed that it was the imperative form of Akkadian nāqaru, "destroy!" A lexical list explains his name as a synonym of the Akkadian word for sword, namsaru. However, another text of the same genre translates it as "butcher", ṭābiḫu.

In Mesopotamian sources Ugur's name was used as a logogram representing the name of Nergal at least from the Middle Babylonian period onward. However, originally he was his attendant deity (sukkal). Wilfred G. Lambert proposed that he was initially imagined as a personification of Nergal's weapon, specifically a sword, though this proposal is not universally accepted. After the Old Babylonian period, Ishum replaced him as Nergal's attendant. In the Nippur god list, as well as in An = Anum and its forerunner, Ugur does not appear in the proximity of Nergal, though he is still explicitly identified as his sukkal. He is placed between the sections dedicated to Zababa and Abu alongside his wife (tablet V, lines 52-53). His spouse is attested both in An = Anum and its forerunner, and she bore the name Šī-šarrat ("she is queen").

Due to attestations of epithets such as "the bloody" being applied to Ugur in texts from Anatolia it is assumed that he was associated with death and war. In Hurrian context, under the title Šaum(m)atar, he was associated with two warlike deities, Nupatik and Aštabi. It has been proposed that this epithet was derived from an Indo-European language, and that it might be cognate with Sanskrit somadhara (Milky Way) or soma-dhana ("containing soma"). However, it was in use chiefly in some of the Hurrian-speaking areas.

In Hittite sources the logogram ^{d}U.GUR could represent Šulinkatte, a war god of Hattian origin described as having the appearance of a young man. (Note: However, he was also sometimes represented by the logogram ^{d}ZA.BA_{4}.BA_{4}.) In late Hittite sources, ^{d}U.GUR could also be used to represent the name Zilipuri, a household god of Hattian origin.

== Worship ==
The oldest possible attestation of Ugur is an entry in the Early Dynastic Abu Salabikh god list, ^{d}u_{4}-gur. However, it has been argued that it might instead be an unrelated theonym related to the term gur, "to (let) return", or to Ugurara, "howling storm", attested in later sources as a standard epithet of Ishkur. Another early mention of him might be present in an inscription on a foundation tablet of Enshakushanna, an Early Dynastic king of Uruk, but the restoration of the theonym is uncertain. It commemorates the construction of a temple. Further early attestations include two theophoric names from the Ur III period, Puzur-Ugur and Ur-Ukura. Theophoric names invoking Ugur are also mentioned in a supplement to ^{d}Inana-teš_{2}, a text enumerating personal names which belonged to the scribal school curriculum in Old Babylonian Nippur. An Old Assyrian text from the archive of Šalim-Aššur discovered in Kanesh presumed to be the inventory of a privately maintained chapel mentions "2 hawiru for/of salt, 1 cup of silver and a perfume-flask" placed in front of a representation of Ugur. It is possible that the deities listed in this fragment were the family gods of one of the inhabitants of the city, though this remains impossible to verify with certainty.

The Canonical Temple List, which most likely was originally composed in the second half of the Kassite period, preserves the ceremonial names of a number of houses of worship dedicated to Ugur, including Emeslamnigurru, "Emeslam which is clad in terror" (Note: Emeslam, "house of the warrior of the underworld", is well attested as the ceremonial name of the temple of Nergal in Kutha and of other houses of worship dedicated to this god or related figures.) and Esulim-Enlile ("house of the awesome radiance of Enlil") in Girsu, and a temple in Isin whose name is lost. Andrew R. George notes that the worship of Ugur in the latter of these cities most likely reflects the well attested presence of cults of underworld deities in it, with other examples including Nergal, Ningishzida and the otherwise unknown goddess Lakupittu who according to him was likely the tutelary deity of Lagaba near Kutha.

It is presumed that the name of the goddess Ugurtu, who was worshiped in Assur in the temples of Ea-šarri and the Sebitti, was derived from Ugur's.

=== Hurrian reception ===
Ugur was also worshiped in Hurrian religion. "Ugur of Teshub" appears in the kaluti (offering lists) dedicated to the circle of this god. In the standard kaluti of Teshub of Aleppo, he occurs on the twenty sixth position, before the "heroes of Teshub" and after Argaba, a figure also related to the weather god whose name is attested elsewhere as the name of a mountain.

Hurrian theophoric names invoking Ugur have been identified in the texts from Mari, for example Arip-Ugur ("Ugur gave [a child]") and Ḫazip-Ugur ("Ugur heard"). An individual named Ugur-atal appears in a text from Tell al-Rimah. Examples are also known from Nuzi, which indicates he was worshiped in eastern Hurrian areas as well. One example is Ḫutip-Ukur ("Ugur elevated").

=== Hittite reception ===
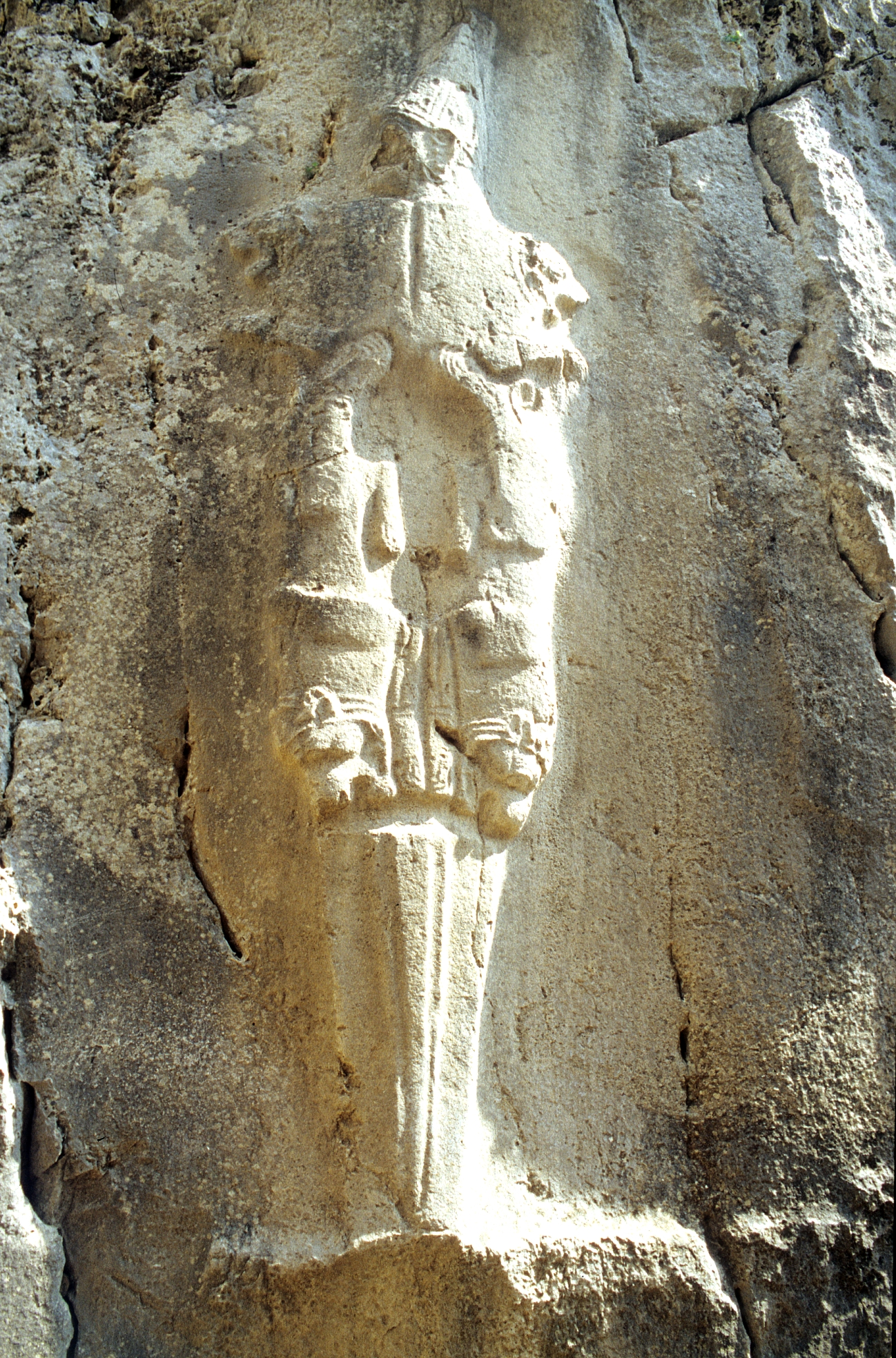
A possible depiction of Ugur as a sword-like figure from Yazılıkaya.

In the Yazılıkaya sanctuary, which was dedicated to deities originally belonging to the western Hurrian pantheon of Kizzuwatna and northern Syria, Ugur might be depicted in chamber B, on a relief showing a figure in the form of a sword with a hilt shaped like a human head and four lions. Frans Wiggermann instead interprets it as a depiction of an unidentified local god of death identified with Nergal. Piotr Taracha proposes that figure number 27 from the procession relief from chamber A of the same site, placed between a pair of bull-men separating earth and heaven and the mountain god Pišaišapḫi, also might be Ugur.

Ugur was one of the deities celebrated in the ḫišuwa festival which originated in Kizzuwatna and was introduced to the Hittite Empire by queen Puduḫepa. Instructions for it prescribe clothing a statue representing him in a short red robe.

Anatolian locations where Ugur was worshiped include Hattusa, where priests in his service are attested, and Kaitana, where a festival dedicated to him took place.

=== Uncertain attestations ===
In Emar a god whose name was written with the logogram ^{d}U.GUR appears in rituals alongside Shuwala, a Hurrian goddess connected with the underworld. ^{d}U.GUR from Emar has been interpreted as the logographic writing of either the name of Nergal or Resheph, though it is also possible it is meant to be read as Ugur, as a syllabic spelling of this name is known from Hurrian texts from both Emar and Nuzi, as pointed out by Daniel E. Fleming. This interpretation is also supposed by Volkert Haas, who assumes he was among Mesopotamian deities introduced to the local pantheon of Emar and that he was regarded as distinct from Nergal locally, and Daniel Schwemer, who argues the presence of Shuwala in the same texts indicates Ugur in this context belongs to a Hurrian milieu.

While no evidence for the existence of a temple dedicated to ^{d}U.GUR in Emar is available, he is mentioned in instructions for the kissu festival of Dagan, which most likely took place in Šatappi, a settlement possibly located further south. During this celebration, songs dedicated to him and Shuwala were sung. The precise meaning of the term kissu remains uncertain, making the nature of these celebrations, and roles of specific deities in them, difficult to ascertain. It has been proposed that the presence of underworld deities, namely ^{d}U.GUR and Shuwala, indicates that it represented the periodic death and return to life of a deity, possibly Dagan's spouse, but this remains speculative. It is also possible that it involved abi, offering pits connected to the cult of underworld deities.

According to Volkert Haas, Ugur was also worshiped in Hayaša. However, according to Alice Mouton the name was used as a logogram in this context to designate a deity comparable to Nergal or Šulinkatte. On occasion, Ugur and "Ugur of Hayaša" could appear as two distinct deities in Hittite offering lists. Piotr Taracha argues that the former should in this context be understood as a logogram representing Zilipuri. The two Ugurs were seemingly regarded as protective deities of the house.

Volkert Haas additionally assumes that "Lord of Ḫubšalum" or "Nergal of Ḫubšalum" known from Tell Leilan and other sites might be the same deity as Ugur. However, Wouter Henkelman identifies this deity as the Elamite god Simut.
