= Laṣ =

Mesopotamian goddess

- Goddess associated with the underworld
- Major cult center: Kutha, Tarbiṣu

Genealogy
- Spouse: Nergal

Laṣ (^{d}La-aṣ; also romanized as Laz) was a Mesopotamian goddess who was commonly regarded as the wife of Nergal, a god associated with war and the underworld. Instances of both conflation and coexistence of her and another goddess this position was attributed to, Mammitum, are attested in a number sources. Her cult centers were Kutha in Babylonia and Tarbiṣu in Assyria.

== Name and character ==
The best attested spelling of the theonym Laṣ in cuneiform is ^{d}La-aṣ, and the single instance of ^{d}La-a-aṣ known from a copy of the Mesopotamian Weidner god list from Ugarit it is not sufficient evidence to support the conclusion that it was pronounced with a long vowel, as the additional sign might be a scribal mistake. Laz is a romanization commonly used in modern publications, but according to Wilfred G. Lambert Laṣ is the most accurate option in the light of the name being spelled with a ṣ in an Aramaic inscription from one of the Sefire steles, KAI 222. It is assumed that the name originates in a Semitic language, but a plausible etymology has yet to be proposed.

Lambert proposed that Laṣ was a goddess of healing, as an explanatory version of the Weidner god list equates her with Bau, while other similar documents place her in the proximity of Gula, who were both regarded as deities of such character.

An Old Babylonian text attests that Laṣ was believed to be capable of interceding with Nergal on behalf of human supplicants, a role commonly associated with wives of major gods. Similar function as a mediator between worshipers and a major deity is well attested in the cases of Shamash's wife Aya, Adad's wife Shala, Ea's wife Damkina, Ishum's wife Ninmug, but also for Ninshubur, the sukkal (divine vizier) of Inanna.

A Neo-Assyrian text calls Laṣ the "mistress of Eridu," nin-NUN^{ki}.

== Associations with other deities ==
Laṣ was the wife of Nergal. In Babylonia, she became the goddess most commonly identified as such starting with the reign of Kurigalzu II, while in Assyria an analogous phenomenon is attested from the reign of Tiglath-Pileser III onward. In the Old Babylonian period, Nergal's wife was usually Mammitum. The god list An = Anum equates them with each other. However, in the so-called "Nippur god list" Laṣ occurs separately from Nergal, while Mammitum is listed alongside him. It is possible that through the second millennium BCE both Laṣ and Mammitum were worshiped in the Emeslam temple in Kutha. In a description of a New Year ritual from Babylon during which the gods of Kish (Zababa), Kutha (Nergal) and Borsippa (Nabu) and their entourages were believed to visit Marduk (at the time of the text's composition likely not yet a major god), both she and Mammitum appear side by side as two separate goddesses. It is possible Mammitum was originally associated with Erra rather than Nergal, and was only introduced to Kutha alongside him. A third goddess labeled as Nergal's wife in An = Anum is Admu ("earth"). She is otherwise only known from theophoric names and a single offering list from Old Babylonian Mari.

In an Ur III offering list from Puzrish-Dagan, Laṣ appears alongside Tadmuštum, a minor underworld goddess regarded as Nergal's daughter. In an inscription from a kudurru (boundary stone) of Marduk-apla-iddina I (the "land grant to Munnabittu kudurru") she is listed a member of a group of underworld deities alongside Nergal, Bēl-ṣarbi, the pair Lugal-irra and Meslamta-ea, Šubula and Mammitum.

In the Weidner god list, the beer goddesses Ninkasi and Siraš occur between Nungal, the goddess of prisons, and Laṣ. It has been proposed that this possible association between beer and underworld deities was meant to serve as a reflection of negative effects of alcohol consumption. Laṣ also occurs in the same text for the second time in association with Simut, an Elamite god who could be equated with Nergal. In a variant of known from a copy from Ugarit, a deity named Raqadu appears instead of her, and according to Manfred Krebernik should be identified as Simut's spouse.

== Worship ==
While no attestations of Laṣ from the third millennium BCE were known to Wilfred G. Lambert at the time of publication of her entry in Reallexikon der Assyriologie und Vorderasiatischen Archäologie, in more recent publications other authors point out she was already worshiped in the Ur III period, as evidenced by lists of offerings to deities of Kutha. This city was located in Babylonia and served as a cult center of Nergal; Laṣ was worshiped in it in his temple, known under the ceremonial name E-Meslam. She is also attested in theophoric names from Lagaba, a small town located in northern Babylonia, possibly near Kutha. Based on a cylinder of Neriglissar, in the Neo-Babylonian period providing for E-Meslam was regarded as a royal duty, similarly as in the case of Marduk's and Nabu's main temples (respectively E-Sagil in Babylon and E-Zida in Borsippa). However, administrative documents indicate that Nergal and Laṣ received fewer offerings than Marduk or Nabu and their respective spouses. Offerings of sheep, bulls and muttāqu (a type of cake) to the pair are attested.

In Assyria the main cult center of Laṣ and Nergal was Tarbiṣu. they are mentioned together in the treaty between Ashur-nirari V of Assyria and Mati'ilu of Arpad among gods meant to guarantee the document will be binding.

A late reference to Laṣ might be present in a theophoric name identified in a Seleucid document from Kutha dated to the year 226 BCE, though the restoration of the theonym is uncertain.

== Mythology ==
Laṣ appears in the myth Erra and Naram-Sin. Wilfred G. Lambert argued that the eponymous god should be understood as Nergal, rather than Erra, due to being referred to as the god of Kutha. In literary texts both Erra and Nergal are names which can designate the latter. In this myth, the eponymous king builds a temple for Erra and his wife after the former approaches him to ask for help in a conflict between him and Enlil. In the end of the composition, Laṣ implores her husband to bless Naram-Sin.
