= Land grant to Munnabittu kudurru =

Ancient Mesopotamian inscribed stone

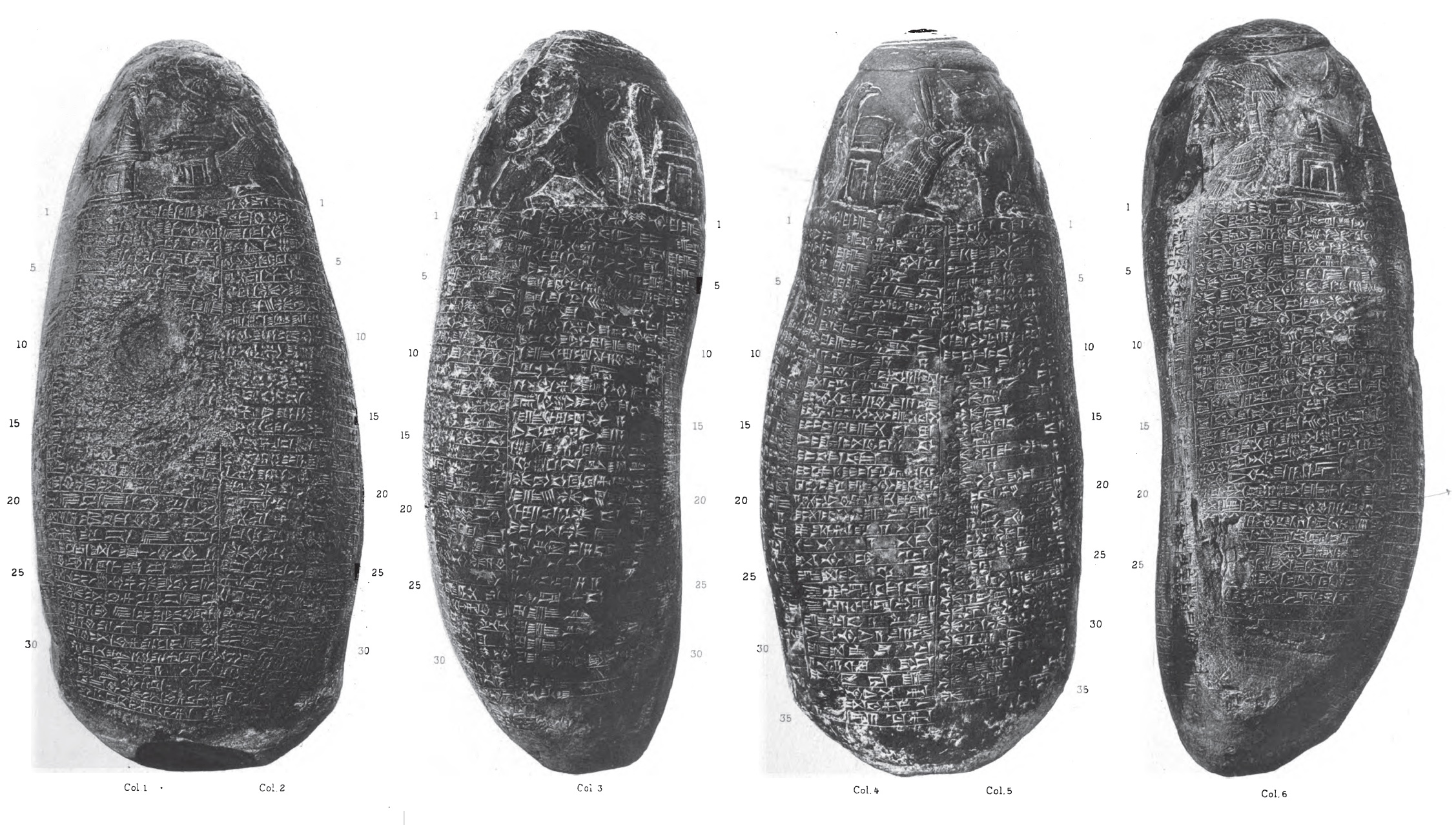
- Kudurru of Marduk-apla-iddina I granting land to his servant Munnabittu
- Material: Limestone
- Height: 46.5 cm
- Width: 20.5 cm
- Created: c. 1165 BC
- Discovered: 1899; Shush, Khuzestan, Iran
- Present location: Paris, Ile-de-France, France

The Land grant to Munnabittu kudurru is an elongated egg-shaped black limestone ancient Mesopotamian narû or entitlement stele (kudurru), 46.5 cm high and 20.5 cm wide, which details the reconfirmation of a gift of 30 GUR of land (around 750 acres) by Kassite king Marduk-apla-iddina I to his servant Munnabittu (a name meaning "fugitive, refugee"), son of Ṭābu-melû (probably a Hurrian name). It is significant because, in addition to portraying eighteen divine icons around its top, it lists forty-seven gods in its inscription, more than any other similar object.

== The stele ==
Recovered from Susa during the French excavations under Jacques de Morgan at the turn of the twentieth century, excavation reference Sb 26, it is currently located in the Louvre Museum. The text covers around three quarters of the surface of the sides with the top part engraved with a relief of religious iconography.

It records the granting of a tract of land in the limits of the town of Šaknanâ, on the banks of the Mēdandan canal, district of Ḫudādu (Baghdad?), originally by Meli-Šipak. The failure to issue a record of this deed resulted in its contention by Munnabbittu’s neighbor, Aḫūnea (probably the hypocoristic form of his name), son of Dayyān-Marduk, who laid claim to a three GUR and twenty qa portion of the field, claiming that "it is the 'gate' of my field". On appeal to Marduk-apla-iddina I, the former governor of Ḫudādu, Kidin-Ninurta, under whose period in office the original grant had been made, and Ṣir-šum-iddina, his successor, together with various city elders, were consulted and unanimously upheld Munnabittu’s claim. Ṣir-šum-iddina and the scribe Bēl-ippašra were dispatched to resurvey the property and confirmed its size.

=== Cast of characters ===
- Meli-Šipak (the earlier king, grantor)
- Munnabittu, son of Ṭābu(DUG.GA)-melû (the beneficiary)
- Izkur-Nabû, "son of Arad-Ea" (neighbor)
- Kidin-Ninurta, son of Namru (ex-governor of Ḫudādu)
- Nabû-šum-iddina, son of Šuzib-Marduk, "son of Arad-Ea" (Meli-Šipak’s royal scribe)
- Marduk-apla-iddina I, (the king rendering judgement)
- Aḫūnea, son of Dayyān-Marduk (the plaintiff)
- Ṣir-šum-iddina, son of Aḫu-banû (governor of Ḫudādu)
- Bēl-ippašra, "son of Arad-Ea" (scribe, surveyor)

Witnesses:

- Libur-zanin-Ekur, ša rēši (^{lú}SAG), a court official
- Ḫa-SAR-du, sukkal mu'erru, previously a beneficiary himself in the land grant to Ḫasardu kudurru, on which both Libur-zanin-Ekur and Iqīša-Bau appeared as witnesses
- Marduk-kudurrī-uṣur, ša rēš šarri (^{lú}SAG LUGAL), a court official
- Uzib-Bēl, sukkal, a court official
- Iqīša-Bau, "son of Arad-Ea", pīḫātu, a minor provincial official?

=== Divine names and symbols ===
The kudurru's significance lies in its extensive list of Mesopotamian deities used in the curse section, the longest by far to appear on any similar object, where around a dozen usually suffice. The elaborate endorsements, however, provided no protection to the monument as within around fifteen years it was taken back to Elam as war-booty by the invading army of Šutruk-Naḫḫunte. The following gives the names of the gods and goddesses in the order in which they appear in the text, with the cuneiform synonym in parentheses when the name is not written phonetically. The divine symbols are numbered as per Hinke's diagram (opposite).

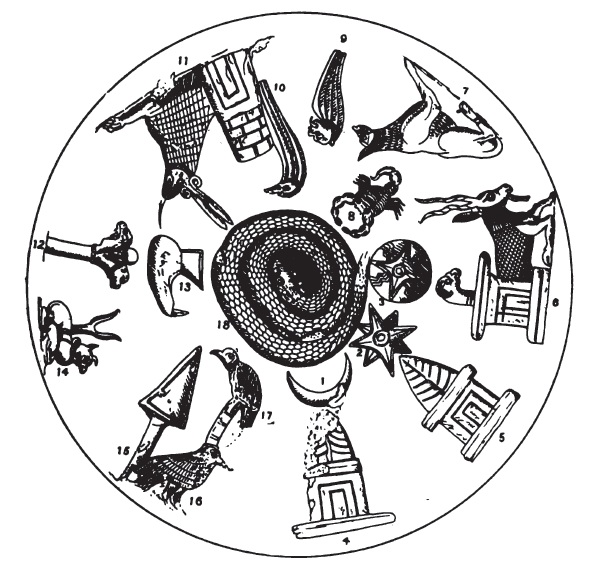
Hinke's artwork for the divine symbols on the top of the kudurru.

- Anu (4. shrine with tiara)
- Enlil (5. shrine with tiara)
- Ea (6. goat-fish in front of shrine)
- Ninhursag
- Sîn (^{d}30) (1. crescent moon)
- Ningal
- Šamaš (^{d}UTU) (3. sun-disc)
- Aya (^{d}GAL)
- Bunene (^{d}ḪAR)
- Kittu (^{d}NIN.GI.NA)
- Mêšara (^{d}NIN.SI)
- ^{d}AT.GI.MAḪ
- ^{d}ŠE.RU.ŠIŠ
- Marduk (^{d}AMAR.UTU) (15. spade)
- Zarpanitum
- Nabû (^{d}AG) (11. horned dragon before brick shrine)
- Tašmetum
- Ninurta (12. double lion-headed symbol)
- Ninkarrag (Gula) (7. dog)
- Zababa (10. vulture-headed symbol)
- Bau (16. the walking bird)
- Damu
- GEŠTIN.NAM
- Ištar (2. Venus-star)
- Nanaya
- Anunitum
- Adad (^{d}IM) (14. bull reclining beneath lightning bolt)
- Šala
- Mišarru
- Nergal (^{d}U.GUR (9. lion-headed symbol)
- Lâṣ
- Išum
- Šubula
- Lugalgirra
- Meslamtae’a
- Šarṣarbati (^{d}LUGAL.GIŠ.A.TU.GAB.LIŠ)
- Ma’-me-tum
- Alammuš (^{d}LÀL)
- Ningublaga (^{d}NIN.BAD)
- Tišpak
- Ištarān (^{d}KA.DI) (18. coiled snake)
- Nusku (^{d}PA+KU) (13. lamp)
- Sadarnunna
- Uraš (^{d}IB)
- Ninegal
- Šuqamuna (17. bird on a perch)
- Šumalia (17. bird on a perch)

Išḫara (8. scorpion), the only symbol not named

=== Principal publications ===
- V. Scheil (1905). Mémoires de la Délégation en Perse, Tome VI: Textes Élamites - Sémitiques. Paris. pp. 31–39. and pl. 9–10: translation and photographs
- W. J. Hinke (1911). Selected Babylonian Kudurru Inscriptions. E. J. Brill. pp. 14–18. line art
