= Erragal =

Mesopotamian god

- Storm god, apotropaic astral deity
- Other names: Errakal
- Major cult center: Me-Turan, Nippur

Genealogy
- Spouse: Ninšar

Erragal or Errakal was a Mesopotamian god presumed to be related to Erra. However, there is no agreement about the nature of the connection between them in Assyriology. While Erragal might have been associated with storms and the destruction caused by them, he is chiefly attested as a benevolent deity, for example as an astral god with apotropaic functions. He was regarded as the husband of the goddess Ninšar, the divine butcher of Ekur, and they could be represented as a pair of stars in astronomical treatises such as MUL.APIN. References to worship of Erragal are uncommon, though he nonetheless appears in a variety of sources from the Isin-Larsa period to Neo-Babylonian times. He also appears in the Epic of Gilgamesh and in Atra-Hasis as a deity linked to the great flood.

== Name and character ==
Erragal's name is etymologically related to that of Erra and it has been suggested that it can be translated as "the great Erra". The shorter theonym in turn goes back to the root ḥrr, possibly "scorching", which is attested in various Semitic languages, including Akkadian. It has been argued that Erragal and Erra were identical with each other due to equations between them postdating the Old Babylonian period, or that Erragal was a "fusion hypostasis" of Erra and Nergal, comparable to double theonyms designating a single deity common in Ugaritic texts such as Nikkal-wa-Ib, Kothar-wa-Khasis or Qudšu-wa-Amrur, but according to Frans Wiggermann Erragal's role in the Mesopotamian pantheon was distinct and he should be considered a separate god in origin, rather than just a form of Erra. This is also accepted as a possibility by Frank Simons. However, Kynthia Taylor disagrees with Wiggermann and argues that due to the proximity of these two deities in god lists and the fact that Erragal is well attested in texts written in the Emesal dialect of Sumerian it is plausible they developed under similar circumstances, with Erragal originally being an epithet applied to Erra in Emesal texts which eventually came to be viewed as a separate figure. Further related theonyms include Errakal, Errakalkal, Errakar and Erkal. The first of them is presumed to functionally be a double of Erragal, and based on distribution in known texts might represent an Akkadian spelling of the same name, following the well attested phenomenon of interchange between voiced and voiceless consonants in Sumerian loanwords in this language. The form Erragal can be found for example in the Old Babylonian Weidner god list and in a god list from Susa, while Errakal occurs in later An = Anum (tablet VI, line 10) as well as in Atra-Hasis and the Epic of Gilgamesh.

It has been argued that Erragal was originally associated with storms and with the destruction caused by them. According to Nicla de Zorzi a passage in the section of Enūma Anu Enlil focused on the weather can be translated as an omen pertaining to him, "Erragal will bring hard times to the land". However, he is portrayed as a benevolent in most texts referencing him. He functioned as an astral deity. In the incantation series Ḫulbazizi ("Evil be gone!") he is invoked alongside the Pleiades, Sirius and Jupiter for apotropaic purposes. He has also been described as a god linked to the underworld.

== Associations with other deities ==
In the god list An = Anum (tablet I, line 332) Erragal appears among the gods of Nippur as the husband of Ninšar, a goddess described as the butcher and cook of Ekur. There is no indication that he was ever associated with the wife of Erra, Mami, instead. According to the astronomical compendium MUL.APIN, Erragal and Ninšar corresponded to two paired stars located in the proximity of that associated with "Lamma, the messenger of Baba", a part of a constellation known as "She-Goat", modern Lyra. It is presumed that the "star of Erragal" corresponds to Zeta Lyrae. Erragal and Ninšar were also collectively associated with nigkalagû, assumed to be either apotropaic bells or a gong making a sound similar to thunder. They also shared a connection to knives, and in an explanation of a ritual they are collectively addressed as the "bearers of the bronze dagger".

A bilingual edition of the Weidner god list from Emar might equate Erragal with Tarḫunna or Tarḫunt, respectively the Hittite and Luwian weather god, though the reasons behind this are uncertain. It has been noted that the multilingual versions of this text are unlikely to be reliable sources of theological information.

It has been suggested that the name of the Greek hero Heracles was derived from that of Erragal. However, due to Walter Burkert's critical assessment of this proposal it is generally accepted that it rests on "uncommonly slippery grounds".

== Worship ==
References to Erragal in known sources are scarce. Oldest certain attestations are theophoric names from the Isin-Larsa period, such as KUG-Erragal and Puzur-Erragal; an older, Ur III name written Èr-ra-gal most likely should be read as Erra-rabi and does not invoke him. An Old Babylonian legal document of unknown provenance mentions him alongside Adad of Šuḫatum, an otherwise entirely unknown settlement. In other contemporary texts his attestations are largely limited to entries in god lists.

A Middle Assyrian text refers to Me-Turan (Sirara) as a cult center of Erragal, though his name might only be used as a stand-in for Nergal in this context, as the latter is well attested in association with this city. The rebuilding of Erragal's temple located there is mentioned on a broken prism of Ninurta-tukulti-Ashur.

A number of letters presumed to originate in Babylon and dated to either the last years of the reign of Esarhaddon or the first of Ashurbanipal describes the repairs of statues of a number of deities apparently worshiped in this city, including Erragal, as well as Urash, Belet-ekalli, Šarrāḫītu, Zababa and Lugal-Marada. The Nippur Compendium, known from Neo-Babylonian copies, states that in this city Erragal was worshiped in the "outer court in the scepter" and in the temple of Nergal. An inscription of Nabonidus from the so-called Eigikalama Cylinder describes Erragal as "the most powerful among the gods" and credits him as one of the deities who bestowed kingship upon him.

== Mythology ==
In both the Epic of Gilgamesh (tablet XI, line 102) and the Neo-Assyrian version of Atra-Hasis, Erragal is responsible for "ripping out the mooring-poles" before the flood. Frans Wiggermann tentatively suggests that this might be a wordplay involving the name Errakal and the term tarkullu. It can be literally translated as "mooring pole", but metaphorically it could refer to connections between various elements of the universe. Erragal's role in Mesopotamian literature is limited to these texts, but it has been argued that a reference to these two passages can be found in the myth Erra and Ishum (tablet IV, lines 118–120), where the first of the eponymous gods describes the destruction he is capable of causing:

Let me rip out the mooring-pole so that the ship keeps drifting away,

Let me break the rudder so it cannot dock at the shore,

Let me tear out the mast, let me rip out its rigging

According to a recent publication by Elyze Zomer a further possible reference to Erragal in a similar context also occurs in the text HS 1885+ from Nippur, a "royal epic" (Königsepos) describing the conflict between Gulkišar, the sixth king of the First Dynasty of Sealand, and Samsu-Ditana, with the former portrayed as the protagonist.
