= Bēl-ṣarbi =

Mesopotamian god of poplars

Bel-ṣarbi
- God of poplars, underworld deity
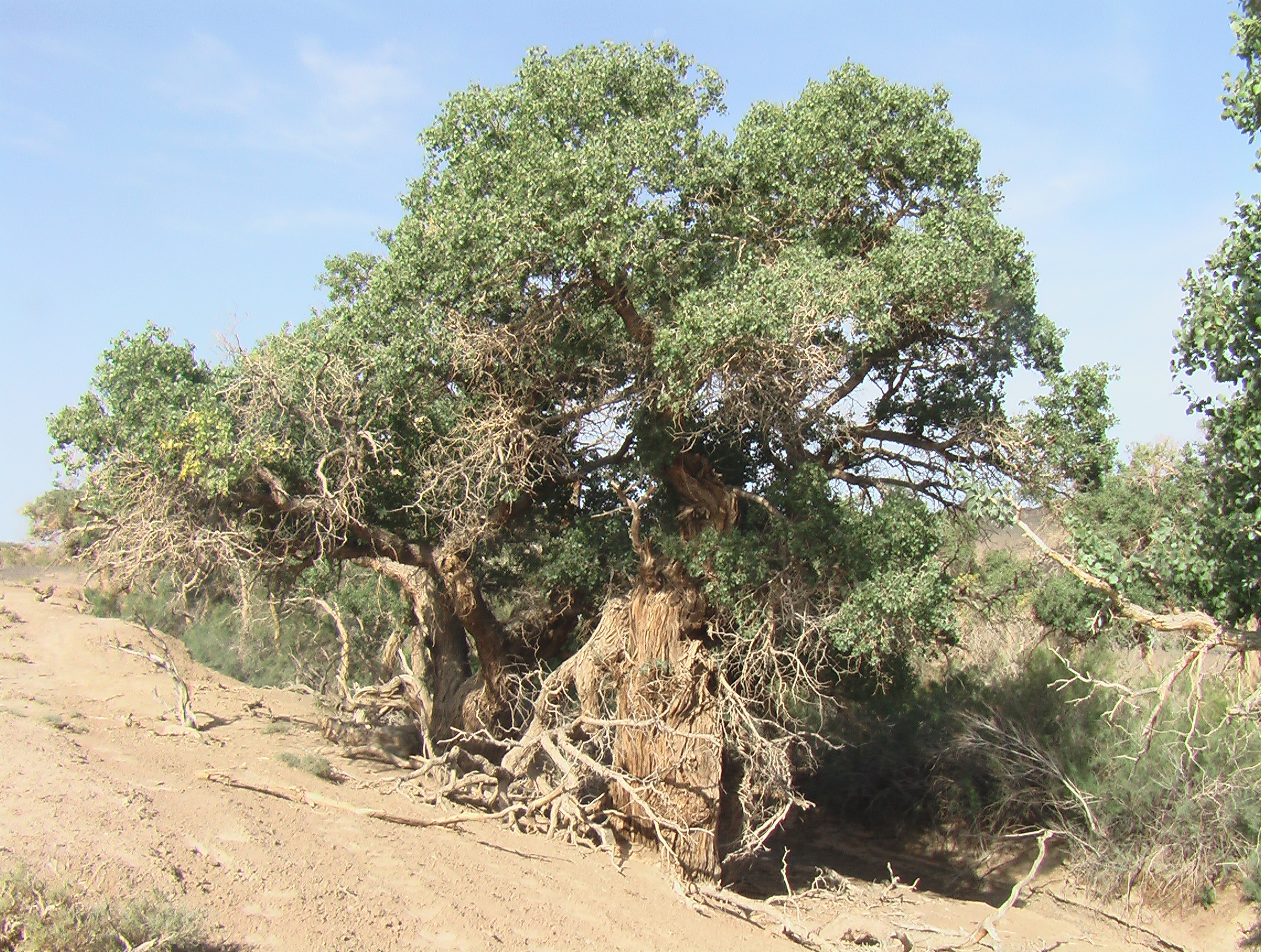
- The Euphrates poplar (Populus euphratica), a tree which ancient Mesopotamians associated with Bel-ṣarbi.
- Other names: Šar-ṣarbati. Lugal-asal
- Major cult center: Baz, Ḫiritum, Iabušum

Bel-ṣarbi or Šar-ṣarbati (Akkadian: "lord of the poplar") was a Mesopotamian god associated with poplars. He was also known under the Sumerian name Lugal-asal. He frequently appears in enumerations of deities associated with the underworld who formed the entourage of Nergal, and in some cases could be equated with him. A possible feminine counterpart, NIN-ṣar-BE, is known from Neo-Assyrian sources, and is sometimes identified with earlier Ištar-ṣarbatum from Ebla in modern scholarship.

== Name and character ==
The name Bēl-ṣarbi means "lord of the poplar" (the tree meant is assumed to be Populus euphratica) in Akkadian. In Sumerian it was rendered as Lugal-asal. The names are used interchangeably in scholarship. The second element can be interpreted as a nisba, since it can be written with the determinative of a place name (ṣar-bi^{ki}). Possibly a name of an area associated with the god, perhaps a grove, was derived from poplar trees. It is assumed two separate places bearing the name Ṣarbat existed. The southern Ṣarbat or Ṣarbatum was located near Babylon, Dilbat and Sippar, while the northern Ṣarbat most likely in the proximity of the Sinjar Mountains (known as Saggar in antiquity).

Bel-ṣarbi could also be associated with the Euphrates, as attested in the incantation compendium Šurpu. Similarly, a lipšur litany describes him as a god who "travels on the Tigris and the Euphrates".

Additionally, Bēl-ṣarbi could also be regarded as one of the gods associated with underworld.

According to an esoteric text assigning various objects and substances to deities, Lugal-asal corresponded to a muššaru stone. It is assumed that this term refers to a red agate.

== Worship ==
Bēl-ṣarbi was the city god of Baz (Baṣ). In Neo-Assyrian sources it was called Šapazzu. This settlement was located near Dilbat. (Note: An association between Baz and the Bazi dynasty of Babylon has been proposed, but it has been argued that its name instead corresponds to a location near the juncture of the Diyala and Tigris rivers, associated with the Kassite clan Bīt-Bazi. It is possible that both names are derived from the Akkadian word baṣṣu, "sandbank," and that originally multiple settlements bearing this name existed, even though only one is present in sources from the first millennium BCE.) A temple dedicated to Bēl-ṣarbi, E-durgina (Sumerian: "house, established abode") existed in it. Its name has also been rendered as E-tušgina. It was rebuilt by Nebuchadnezzar II.

The gods of Baz were carried off to Assyria during the reign of Tiglath-Pileser III. A relief from Kalhu dated to this period shows Assyrian soldiers carrying away the figure of a god holding an unidentified object. It has been suggested that it might be Bēl-ṣarbi, and that an eagle emblem present on the same relief also belonged to him. A further Assyrian source mentioning Bēl-ṣarbi is a text from the reign of Ashurbanipal which mentions that "Lugal-asal of Šapazzu" was among the deities who accompanied him during his campaign against Elam, which most likely took place in the year 653 BCE. The other gods mentioned are Ashur, Marduk, Nabu, Anu rabu (Ištaran) and Shamash.

In the Old Babylonian period Bēl-ṣarbi was associated with Ḫiritum and Iabušum. An inscription of Samsu-iluna which mentions various forts he built for specific deities lists Iabušum in association with Bēl-ṣarbi. The king describes him as a god "who magnifies my royal name".

Multiple god lists mention Lugal-asal, including An = Anum and its forerunner, as well as the Nippur god list and the Weidner god list.

== Associations with other deities ==
On a kudurru (boundary stone) of Marduk-apla-iddina I (the "land grant to Munnabittu kudurru") Šar-ṣarbati appears as a member of a group of underworld deities: Nergal, his wife Laṣ, Šubula, the pair Lugal-irra and Meslamta-ea and Mammitum. In Šurpu he appears alongside Nergal, Ishum and Šubula. Under the name Lugal-asal he could be outright identified with Nergal, similar to a number of other gods associated with trees: Lugal-gišimmar ("lord of the date palm"), Lugal-zulumma ("lord of the dates;" sometimes erroneously listed as a name of Dumuzi in secondary literature) and Lugal-šinig ("lord of the tamarisk;" he could also be identified with Ninurta).

=== NIN-ṣar-BE and INANNA-ṣarbat ===
The name of the goddess NIN-ṣar-BE, "lady of the poplar", was the female counterpart of Bēl-ṣarbi. It is possible her name should be read as Bēlet-ṣarbe or Bēlet-ṣarbat. She was a part of the state pantheon of the Neo-Assyrian Empire, and appears in one of the Tākultu texts. It has been proposed that she can be identified with the goddess INANNA-ṣarbat, though this remains uncertain and some researchers, for example Martin Stol, consider Assyrian NIN-ṣar-BE and the western goddess to be two separate deities. The latter was worshiped in Ebla and in pre-Sargonic Mari already, and appears in later documents from Emar as well. It has been suggested that her presence in Ebla was the result of political and commercial ties with Mari. The name is interpreted as Ištar-ṣarbatum in translations of texts from Ebla, while the form from Emar is romanized as Aštar-ṣarba. She has been characterized as a goddess of the middle Euphrates area, but it is unclear if her cult center was the northern settlement Ṣarbat.
