= Ishum =

Mesopotamian god

- Divine night watchman
- Symbol: possibly a torch

Genealogy
- Parents: Shamash and Sudaĝ (Aya), alternatively Shamash and Ninlil
- Spouse: Ninmug
- Children: possibly Shubula

Equivalents
- Sumerian: Hendursaga

Ishum (Išum; possibly the masculine form of Akkadian išātum, "fire") was a Mesopotamian god of Akkadian origin. He is best attested as a divine night watchman, tasked with protecting houses at night, but he was also associated with various underworld deities, especially Nergal (or Erra) and Shubula. He was associated with fire, but was not exclusively a fire god unlike Gibil. While he was not considered to be one of the major gods, he was commonly worshiped and appears in many theophoric names. In bilingual texts he could be associated with Sumerian Hendursaga, but this equation is only attested for the first time in the Old Babylonian period, and the rationale behind it remains uncertain. Both of those gods could be regarded as the husband of the goddess Ninmug, though she was primarily associated with Ishum and only secondarily with Hendursaga.

== Character ==
Ishum has been characterized as a "benevolent fire-god". It has been proposed that his name was related to the Akkadian word išātum, "fire", cognates of which are present in multiple Semitic languages, both extinct and extant. Andrew R. George proposes that his name was simply the masculine form of išātum. However, there is no clear evidence that he was exclusively a fire god like Gibil (Girra). A possible reference to Ishum as a fire god is present in the Epic of Erra, where he is called a "firebrand" (diparu). He was frequently described as a divine night watchman. Many of his epithets refer to this role, including "Herald (nimgir) of the Street," "Headman of the Street," "Hero who Goes about at Night," "Minister (sukkal) of the Night," "Herald of the Night, Lord of the Street." He could be worshiped as a protective god of the household. However, as noted by Andrew R. George, he should be differentiated from gods of the household in the proper sense, as he was believed to protect houses from without by patrolling the streets at night, not from within.

No pictorial representations of Ishum have been identified, and it is uncertain if any specific symbol served as his attribute. However, based on textual sources it is considered possible that he was associated with torches.

== Worship ==
The oldest evidence for the worship of Ishum are theophoric names, already attested in sources from the Early Dynastic period. They are common in sources from the Ur III period, and retained popularity through the later periods of Mesopotamian history. He is also common in inscriptions on cylinder seals, and according to Dietz Otto Edzard, Ishum's popularity in these two types of displays of personal devotion can be compared to that of major gods of the Mesopotamian pantheon. Ishum's importance grew further in the Neo-Assyrian period, possibly because his character made him a suitable deity in times of political instability and war.

According to a Middle Babylonian metrological text, a shrine of Ishum existed in Nippur. He was also worshiped in Tarbiṣu in Assyria, where he received offerings alongside Nergal and Laṣ.

== Associations with other deities ==
According to Joan Goodnick Westenholz, Ishum's mother was Sudaĝ, one of the names of the wife of Shamash (Aya). Due to an association between Sudaĝ and Sud (Ninlil), a myth lists the latter as his mother instead. Manfred Krebernik considers this to be the result of confusion between the names, rather than syncretism. Ishum's father was Shamash.

After the Old Babylonian period, Ishum came to be seen as the sukkal (attendant deity) of Nergal, replacing Ugur. The god list An = Anum is the only source which explicitly refers to Ishum as Nergal's sukkal, but his activity in literary texts is often related to this function. He often appears in enumerations of deities of the underworld, for example in Šurpu (alongside Nergal, Shubula and Šar-ṣarbati) and on a kudurru (boundary stone) of Marduk-apla-iddina I, the "land grant to Munnabittu kudurru" (alongside Nergal, his wife Laṣ, Shubula and the pair Lugal-irra and Meslamta-ea). Shubula appears alongside him particularly commonly in known sources, but the nature of the connection between them is not certain. While it is commonly assumed that Shubula was Nergal's son, Jeremiah Peterson remarks that in the light of recent research it is possible that he was Ishum's son instead. In one text, Ishum and Shubula are called the "gods of Tigris and Euphrates."

When first introduced to the Mesopotamian pantheon, Ishum was not conflated with any Sumerian god of analogous character, similar to other minor gods of Akkadian origin, such as Shullat and Hanish. Starting in the Old Babylonian period, he came to be equated with Hendursaga in bilingual contexts, with the former appearing in Akkadian and the latter in Sumerian formulas. They were also equated with each other in the Weidner and Nippur god lists, and possibly in An = Anum, though due to state of preservation and possible scribal errors the last case is uncertain. However, the reasons behind the association between these two gods are presently unknown. Another god closely related to both of them was Engidudu, who was the divine guardian of the Tabira Gate in the city of Assur. In the Epic of Erra, Engidudu is used as an alternate name of Ishum. In a bilingual Akkadian-Amorite lexical list dated to the Old Babylonian period, Ishum s Amorite counterpart is a deity whose name is not fully preserved, a-a-[x]-um. While full reconstruction is not possible, Andrew R. George and Manfred Krebernik suggest that the most plausible interpretation is that the name is a derivative of the root ʔwr, "to shine", and thus a cognate of Akkadian urrum, "dawn, daytime", Ugaritic ảr, "light", and Hebrew ʔōr, "to shine" and ʔōr, "light". On this basis they suggest the restoration a-a-[ru]-⸢um⸣, pronounced as /ʔārum/. Presumably this figure was a minor god in the Amorite pantheon.

Ishum's wife was Ninmug, a goddess of crafts and birth originally worshiped in Kisiga. They are first attested as a couple in the Old Babylonian period. As in the case of other divine wives, such as Aya and Shala, Ninmug was invoked to intercede with her husband on behalf of worshipers. No children of this couple are known. Ninmug could also be regarded as the wife of Hendursaga, but this was a secondary development based on the equation between him and Ishum. It is possible that in the third millennium BCE, Hendursaga's wife was instead Dumuziabzu, the tutelary goddess of Kinunir (Kinirsha), a city in the state of Lagash, though in that period family relations between deities were often particularly fluid or uncertain.

== Mythology ==
=== Erra and Ishum ===
Ishum is one of the main characters of the composition Erra and Ishum, also known as Epic of Erra. While the other eponymous god is referred to as Erra, in literary texts this name was considered to be interchangeable with Nergal's.

The oldest known copies come from the Assyrian city of Nineveh and have been dated to the seventh century BCE, but it has been argued that the composition is between 100 and 400 years older than that based on possible allusions to historical events which occurred during a period of calamity which Babylonia experienced roughly between eleventh and eighth centuries BCE. Based on a colophon, it was compiled by a certain Kabti-ilāni-Marduk. Attribution of the text of a myth to a specific author was uncommon in ancient Mesopotamia. It is assumed that the beginning of the poem designates Ishum as the god who revealed the text of the poem to Kabti-ilāni-Marduk in a dream.

Ishum is introduced trying to stop his master Erra and his servants, the Sebitti, from waging war on the inhabitants of Babylonia. Erra dismisses him, noting that it is necessary to regain respect in the eyes of humans, and embarks on a destructive campaign. The following bloodshed is described from the perspective of Ishum, who explains that the chaos wrought by Erra surpasses the capability of other gods or mortal kings. These sections of the poem do not celebrate Erra, but rather focus on the suffering of his victims. Ishum eventually manages to bring an end to the bloodshed by waging a war himself on the inhabitants of Mount Sharshar, seemingly a site associated with the origin of a period of chaos in the history of late second and early first millennium BCE Babylonia which likely inspired this myth. Ishum's war is described in very different terms to Erra's, and with its end the period of instability comes to a close. Erra is seemingly content with the actions of his sukkal and with hearing the other gods acknowledge the power of his rage. The narrative ends with him instructing Ishum to spread the tale of his rampage, but also to make it clear that only thanks to his calming presence the world was spared. Andrew R. George notes that Ishum appears to play the role of Erra's conscience through the entire duration of the story.

=== Other myths ===
In a fragment of an Old Babylonian poem, Ishtar explains the circumstances of Ishum's birth to Enlil. In this composition, he was abandoned on the street before she found him, which might be a mythical justification of his role as a divine watchman. Andrew R. George notes that the mention of Ishtar temporarily taking care of the young god is unusual, as she "was consistently described as not at any age temperamentally disposed to care for a baby," though he proposes that it might have been a nod to stars lighting up the night, the primary time of Ishum's activity. Similarly, the fact that Ishum's parents according to this composition were Shamash and Ninlil is regarded as unusual and likely results from confusion between alternate names of Ninlil and Shamash's wife Aya.

Ishum also appears in the text Underworld Vision of an Assyrian Prince. The eponymous figure, Kummâ (relation to any historical figures is uncertain), avoids being killed by Nergal, who is convinced that he insulted his wife, only thanks to the intervention of Ishum.
