= Ninšatapada =

Ancient Mesopotamian princess and author

- Occupation: high priestess of Meslamtaea
- Language: Sumerian
- Period: Old Babylonian period
- Notable works: Letter to Rim-Sîn I
- Relatives: Sîn-kāšid

Ninšatapada (also romanized as Ninshatapada; active c. 1800 BCE) was a Mesopotamian princess from the Old Babylonian dynasty of Uruk. She is known from a letter addressed to Rim-Sîn I, in which she implores him to restore her to her former position as a high priestess of Meslamtaea. The letter was incorporated into the curriculum of Mesopotamian scribal schools.

== Biography ==
Ninšatapada was a princess from the Old Babylonian dynasty of Uruk. Her father was Sîn-kāšid, who reigned over this city in the nineteenth century BCE. She was most likely born when he was still young, in the third quarter of said century. Since no information about her grandfather is known, and her father originally served as the governor (šakkanakkum) of Durum, which was fortified by Ishme-Dagan, it has been suggested that her family might have hailed from Isin.

She was the high priestess (nin-dingir) of Meslamtaea. It is uncertain which king of Uruk was responsible for her appointment, though William W. Hallo argued it is plausible it was her father. The appointment of princesses to similar priestly positions was a tradition going back to the Sargonic period. She resided in Durum, modern Umm al-Wawiya. A letter attributed to her links her a temple located in this city dedicated jointly to Lugalirra and Meslamtaea named E-Meslam, which might be either an abbreviation of E-Meslam-melamilla ("E-Meslam which bears radiance"), which according to an inscription of her father was dedicated only to the latter of these two gods, or alternatively the name of a complex of temples.

After Durum was conquered by Rim-Sîn I of Larsa, Ninšatapada was exiled, but she was likely restored to her position later on. Nathan Wasserman and Yigal Bloch note that this makes it possible to assume that struggles between Old Babylonian dynasties were limited to the spheres of politics and military, and not religion.

Next to Enheduanna, Ninšatapada is one of the two only female historical figures mentioned in the Old Babylonian corpus of Sumerian literary texts.

== Works ==
It is assumed that one of the letters belonging to the text corpus known as the "Royal Correspondence of Larsa" was authored by Ninšatapada. However, her authorship is not entirely certain, and an alternate proposal is that the letter was composed as propaganda by scribes serving the royal court of Larsa. It was written in Sumerian. It is 58 lines long. Six copies most likely to be dated to the eighteenth century BCE are known, with two coming from Nippur and four being of unknown provenance. An additional exemplar has been discovered during excavations in Me-Turan.

The letter is written in first person. It is centered on Ninšatapada's appeal to Rim-Sîn I to restore her to her priestly position. She describes herself as a female scribe (munus dub-sar), daughter of Sîn-kāšid and servant of Rim-Sîn I. She praises the latter king for sparing the population of conquered Uruk and letting the city live in peace, but also laments that she was exiled from Durum, where she formerly lived. She highlights her senior age and loneliness:

Look favorably upon me, let your pronouncement brighten this dark day. They have made me live like a slave these five years away from my city. I have nothing. Because of your silence, my countenance has changed. My body is dead; my course is bent. In the deserted place I clap my hands, I do not know... Though I am youthful in old age, I am abandoned, I am driven from my bedroom. Like a bird in a cage with its young gone from its nest, my children are scattered afar. I do not have anyone to work for me. They do not clammer for my home - they moan about it like doves.

It is not known to what degree the letter reflects historical reality. William W. Hallo argues that it accurately describes the period following the conquest of Durum, and that it was written between 1801 and 1799 BCE, after a four or five year period of exile, when the author by own admission reached old age. Dating the letter to around 1800 BCE is also tentatively accepted by Charles Halton and Saana Svärd.

Comparisons have been made between Ninšatapada's characterization of herself with a similar composition in which Enheduanna presents herself as a "righteous sufferer". A comparable letter addressed to Zimri-Lim is also known. Furthermore, many of the formulas used in Ninšatapada's composition find parallels in royal inscriptions and date formulas of kings of Larsa, which according to Hallo can be considered an example of literary allusion.

The letter of Ninšatapada was incorporated in the curriculum of scribal schools. Alhena Gadotti argues that it was meant to familiarize trainee scribes with a tradition of appointing royal daughters to religious positions, which they in same cases were able to retain after the end of their fathers’ reigns. She assumes the copyists were meant to be introduced to the notion of a shared Mesopotamian heritage through the texts they worked with. She notes Uruk was not a major political power at the time of the letter's composition and inclusion in the scribal school curriculum, but due to its long history it was considered culturally significant, similarly to Lagash and Ur, also well represented in similar text corpora despite no longer being major powers in the Old Babylonian period.
