= Sîn-kāšid =

Sîn-kāšid 𒀭𒂗𒍪𒂵𒅆𒀉

King of Uruk
- Reign: c. 1865 - c. 1833 BC
- Successor: Sin-iribam
- Died: c. 1833 BC
- Spouse: Sallurtum
- Issue: Ninsatapada; Sin-iribam
- House: 6th Dynasty of Uruk

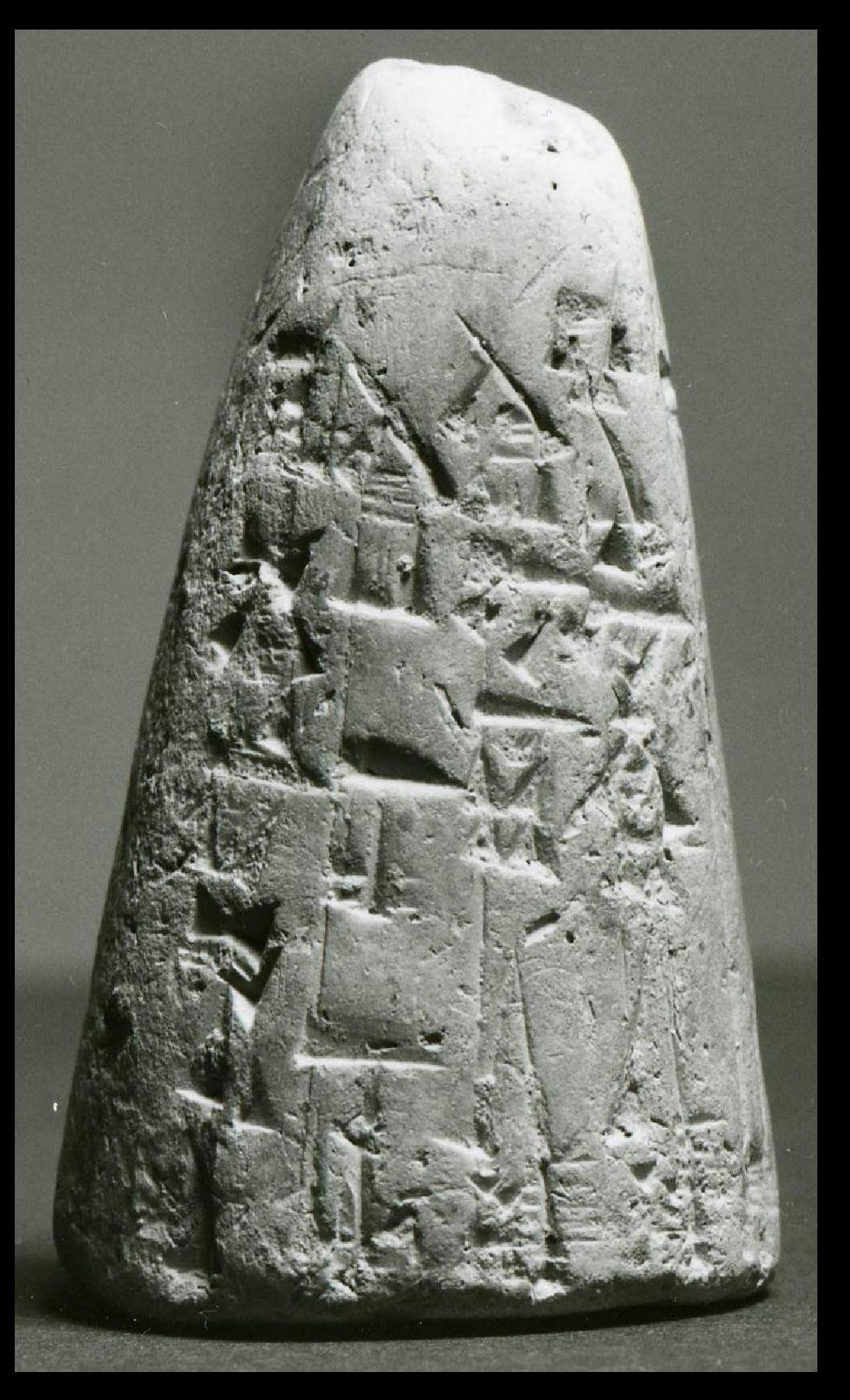
Clay cone which reads “Sîn-kāšid, mighty king, king of Uruk, king of Amnānum, his palace, of kingship he built,” from the Walters Art Museum, Baltimore

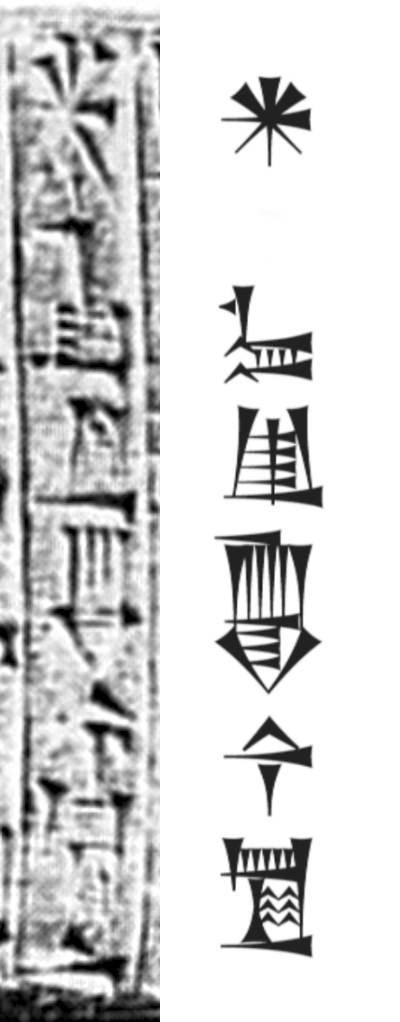
Name of Sîn-kāšid on one of his tablets, and in standard Sumero-Akkadian cuneiform

Sîn-kāšid (inscribed in Akkadian: 𒀭𒂗𒍪𒂵𒅆𒀉: EN.ZU-kà-ši-id; died c. 1833 BC) was the Amorite king of the ancient Mesopotamian city of Uruk during the 19th century BC. No date lists are known nor any year names so his regnal length is uncertain, but it is likely to have been fairly long due to the voluminous building inscriptions extant for which he is best known. He was contemporary with Nur-Adad of Larsa and Enlil-bani of Isin. His apparent lack of relationship with any of the preceding rulers of Uruk and his omission of mentioning his father in any of his inscriptions has led to the belief that he was the founder of a dynasty. He participated in a diplomatic marriage with Šallurtum, the daughter of Sumu-la-El, the second king of the First Babylonian Dynasty, as her name and epithets appear in the seal impressions of three clay bullae recovered from the remains of his palace.

== Biography ==
Sîn-kāšid seems to have begun his career as a viceroy of Dūrum, a small town near Uruk, a city initially under the hegemony of the kings of Isin. It was the beneficiary of his building works as cones commemorate his construction of a temple, the Eniḫušil, “house that bears a fearsome splendour,” to one of the tutelary deities, Lugal-Irra, and the Emeslam for the other one, Meslamtae’a. His letter to the god Meslamtae’a became a belles-lettre of later ages, used in scribal education.

He successfully wrestled the city-state of Uruk away from the dominion of Larsa, thereby founding a 50-year dynasty. He shared genealogical links with Babylon, as he belonged to the same royal lineage of the Amnānum tribe, an oft repeated claim in his inscriptions with his title of "king of the Amnānum," and married a daughter of the second king of Babylon to cement those links further.

He constructed an enormous palace, the Ekituššaḫula, “House – Abode of Rejoicing” and the numerous bricks, tablets and cones (examples pictured) which were imbedded in its walls have found their way into museum collections all over the world, giving him a prominence much greater than that which might have been suggested by political events of his time; a possible reconstruction of his palace can be seen here. A small cache of 25 school texts were found in a room in the ruins and include mathematical exercises and lexical lists. He rebuilt the temple, which was called Eanna, "House of Heaven," and provided a cella (Epapaḫ) for the gods An and Inanna in it, and thereafter styled himself ú-a-é-an-na, “provider of Eanna.” He engaged in many other religious construction projects including the building of an “oval” for a temple (E[ša]ḫula), of the goddess Nanaya, temples for Enki, Iškur, the Egal-maḫ for Ninisina, and a temple (Ekankal), for Lugalbanda and Ninsun. He installed a daughter, Nīši-īnīšu, as NIN-DINGER priestess of his personal god, Lugalbanda, and built a shining “gipar,” or residence, for the entu-priestess.

Some of Sîn-kāšid’s religious endowment inscriptions make reference to the low prices of the commodities barley, wool, copper and vegetable oil, symptomatic of divine favor for the reign as manifested in a strong economy. A comparison with surviving contemporary economic texts, however, shows the pricing to be utopian, approximately a third of the market rate, but his propagandizing technique would be later imitated by others, Sîn-iddinam and Sîn-iqišam of Larsa, Shamshi-Adad I of the Kingdom of Upper Mesopotamia, and others.

He was eventually succeeded by his son Sin-iribam, his grandsons Sîn-gāmil and Ilum-gāmil, and a certain Etēia of unknown provenance, before the dynasty was replaced by An-am, and his son ÌR-ne-ne (Irdanene), kings who had adopted Sumerian names in marked contrast to the Akkadian monikers of his dynasty.

His daughter was Ninšatapada, "Lady Chosen by [means of] the Heart [Omens]," the high-priestess of Meslamtae’a in the city of Dūrum, who apparently authored a letter-prayer to Rim-Sin I (c. 1822-1763 BC), extant in six later copies, in which she pleaded him to end her exile. She supposedly wrote it in old age, after she had been exiled from Dūrum for 4 or 5 years. Rim-Sin would take the city celebrated in his 20th year-name "Year in which Kisurra was seized and annexed to Larsa and (Rim-Sin), with the help of the strong weapon entrusted to him by Enlil, destroyed Durum (Der)". He was to capture Uruk the following year, driving out An-am’s son and successor, Irdanene. The distinct possibility remains that this letter was a poetic device created by a later scribe of Larsa, to provide ideological justification for Rim-Sin’s overthrow of the Sumerian-named kings that had succeeded Sîn-kāšid’s short dynasty, as it uses some of the very same phrases that appear in official date formulae and inscriptions of the Larsa dynasty.

In a foundation tablet, Sîn-kāšid names himself "... provider for Eanna, governor of Dürum, king of Amnã-num ...". It is known from other inscriptions that several other members of the dynasty took the title "King of the Amnanum (Tribe)" (lugal am-na-nu-um) and were members of the same Yaminite tribe of Amnanum as the rulers of Babylon.

An oath text of Ibel-pi-El, ruler of Eshnunna, provides synchronism for Sîn-Kāšid with several rulers:

"... Should Sabum, king of Babylon, or Iku(n)-pi-Sin, (king of Nerebtum), write me for troops, I shall not give (either of) them troops; my troops shall not battle those of Sin-iddinam, king of Larsa, or of Sin-kašid, king of Uruk; I shall not perfidiously have my troops stand against them. Until Sin-iddinam and Sin-kašid make peace with Sabum and Iku(n)-pi-Sin, I shall never make peace (with them) ..."

== See also ==
- List of Mesopotamian dynasties
- Chronology of the ancient Near East

== Gallery ==
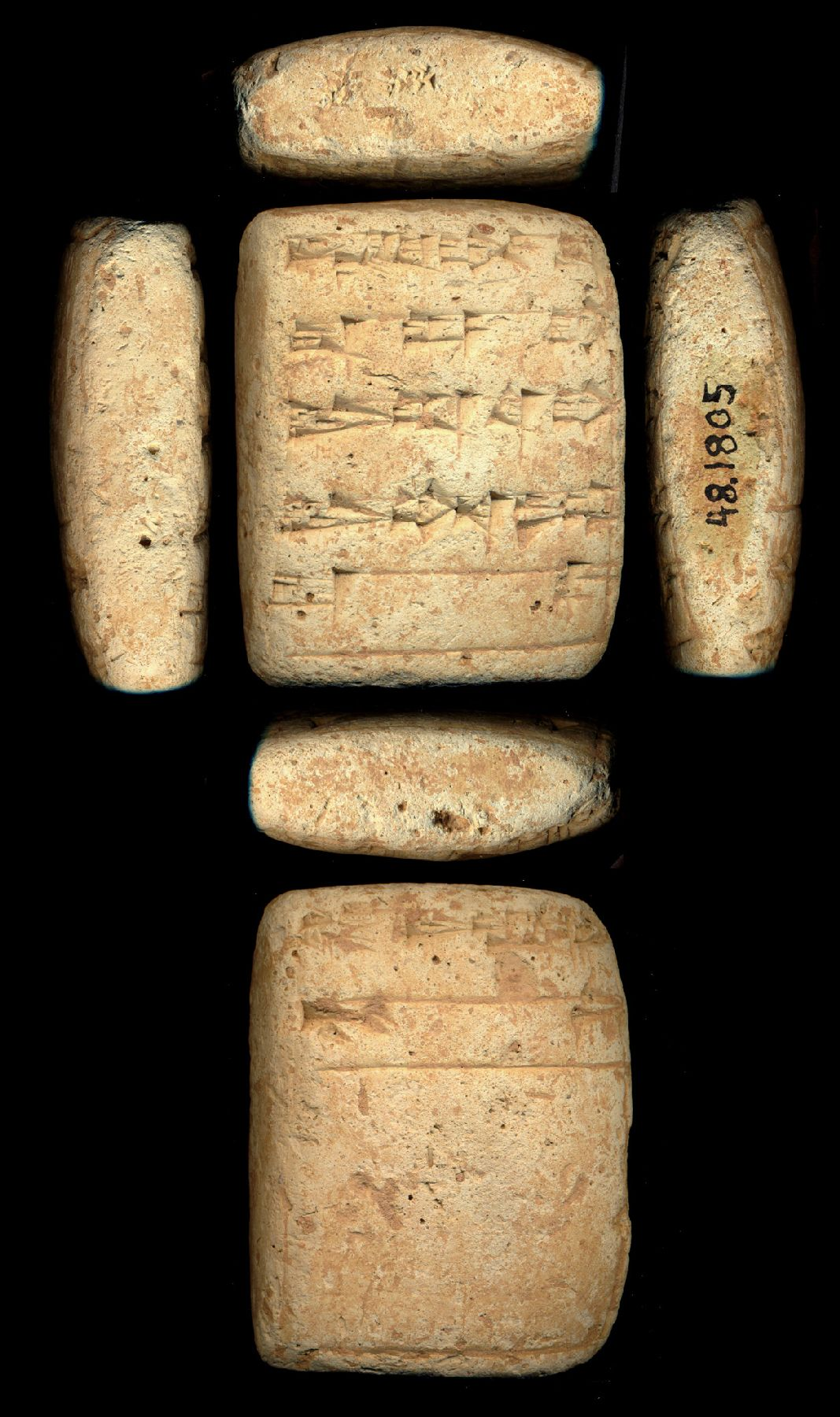
Cuneiform tablet inscribed with Sîn-kāšid’s building dedication, from the Walters Art Museum, Baltimore

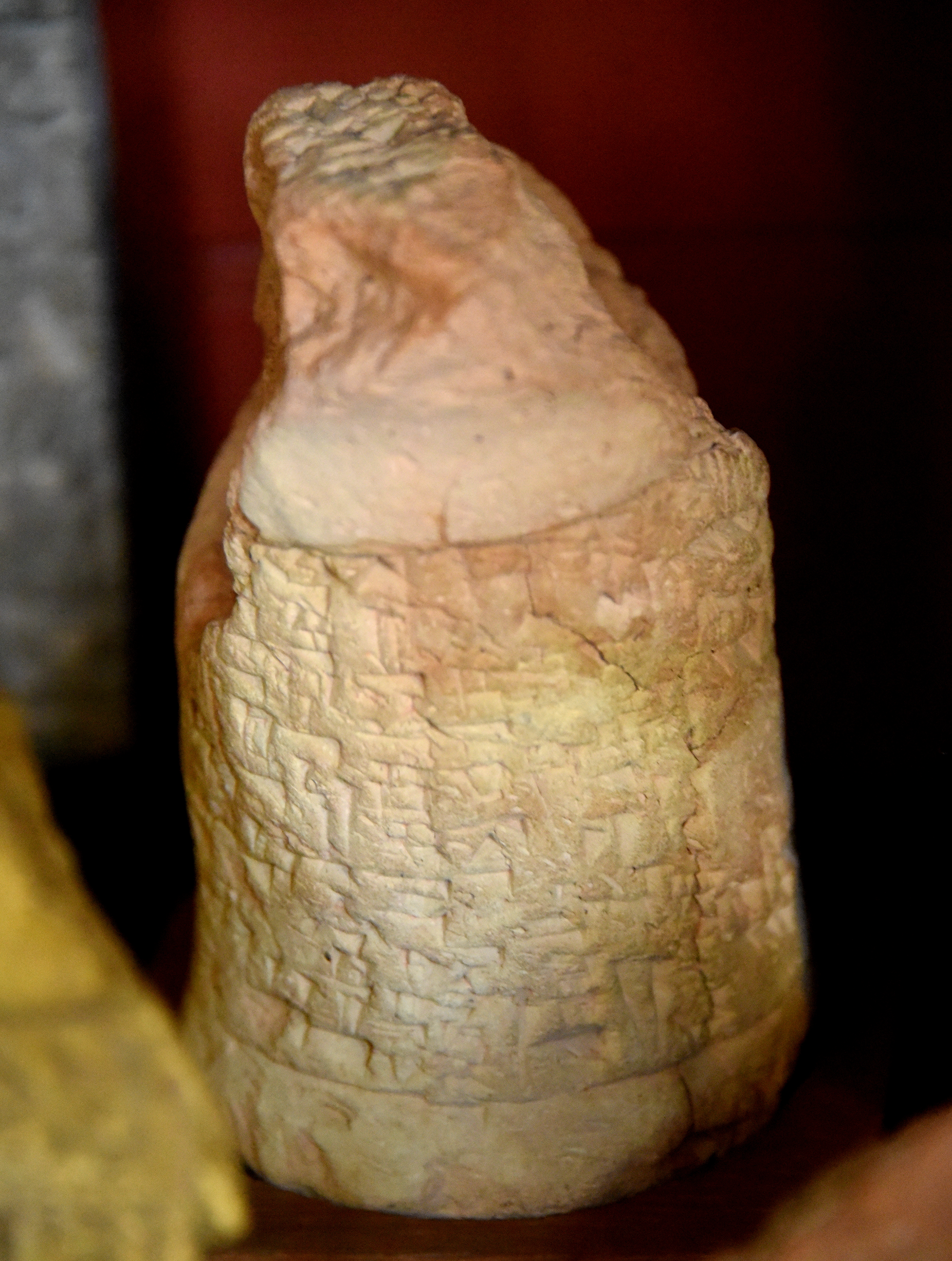
Dedicatory cone inscribed with the name of Sin-Kashid, 18th century BC, from Uruk, currently housed in the British Museum

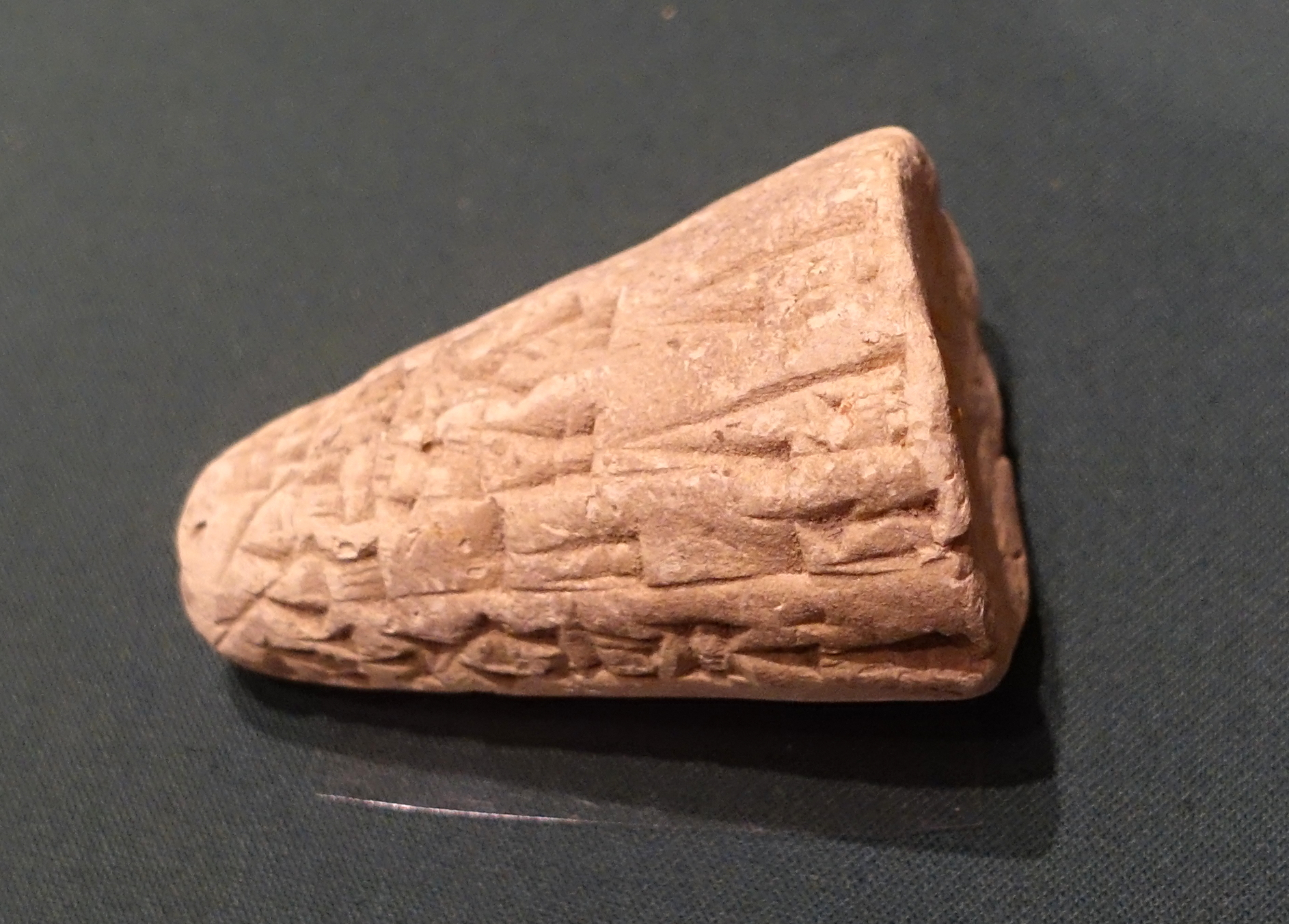
File:Sin-kashid cone (sikkatu), c. 1850 BC - Oriental Institute Museum, University of Chicago

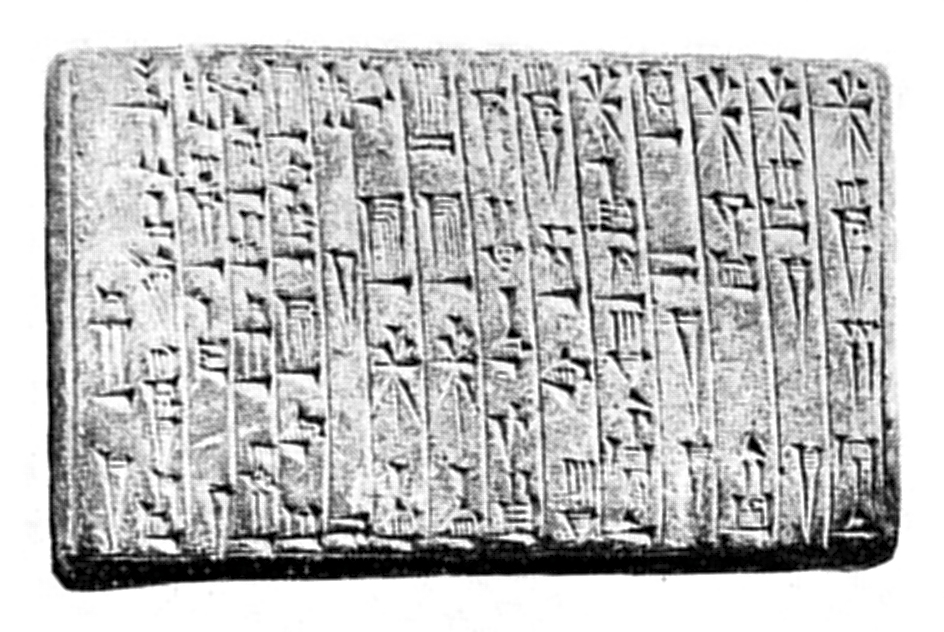
Tablet of Sîn-kāšid, king of Uruk (Neo-Babylonian copy)

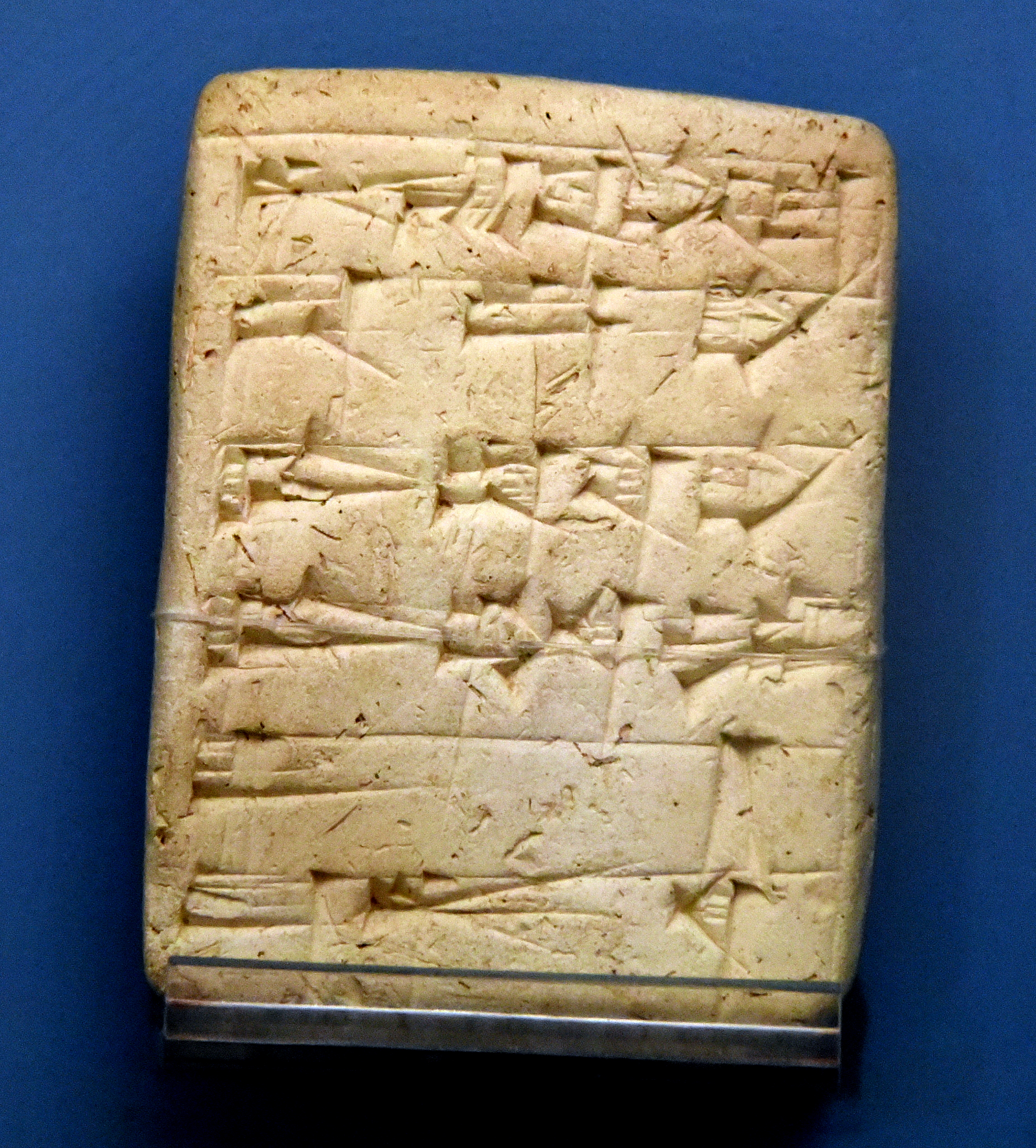
Votive inscription of Sin-Kasid, king of Uruk. From Uruk, Isin-Larsa period, 1865-1833 BC. Ancient Orient Museum, Istanbul.

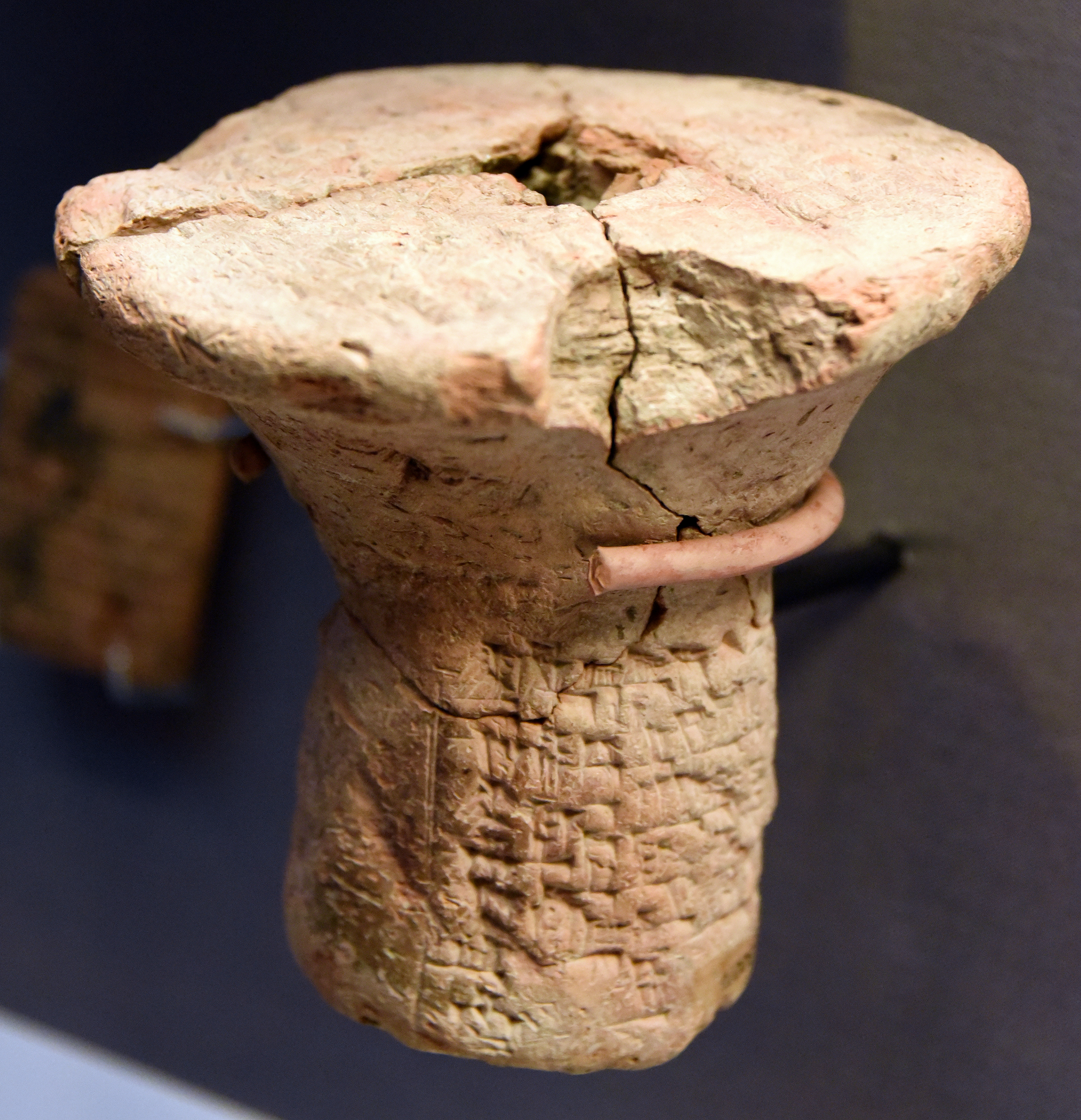
Clay nail, mentioning in detail the wealth of Sîn-kāšid, king of Uruk in Babylon. 19th century BC. From Iraq. British Museum.
