= Cuthites =

People mentioned in the Hebrew Bible

The Cuthites were a people said by the Hebrew Bible and by the 1st-century historian Josephus to be living in Samaria around 500 BC. The name comes from the Assyrian city of Kutha in line with the claim that the Samaritans were descendants of settlers placed in Israel by the Neo-Assyrian Empire after the destruction of the northern Kingdom of Israel around 720 BC. The label "Cuthites" was a pejorative name for Samaritans in later rabbinic literature.

The modern scholarly view is that Yahweh-worshippers in the north of Ancient Israel outnumbered post-722 BC Assyrian settlers, who assimilated into the existing Yahwist population. The "Cuthites", therefore, were not a foreign population in Israel but instead "a branch of Yahwistic Israel in the same sense as the Jews."

== Jewish literature ==
According to the books of Ezra and Nehemiah, the Cuthites were to blame for the postponing of the construction of the Second Temple, during the reign of Cyrus the Great. They did this after the Jewish people returned from Babylonian exile, and first agreed to help them, but after the Jews refused, they lied to king Cyrus who postponed the building process.

The Cuthites are mentioned in Josephus, Antiquities Book 11, Chapter 4, as "Cutheans", naming them as those who were brought from Media and Persia and "planted" in Samaria by the king of Assyria after he had conquered the Ten Tribes of Israel.

Cuth (or Cuthah) is mentioned in the 2 Kings 17:30 in reference to the gods or idols made and worshiped by different tribes, which took place in the former holy places of exiled Israelites (King James Bible trans.): "And the men of Babylon made Succothbenoth, and the men of Cuth made Nergal, and the men of Hamath made Ashima."

There is a minor tractate of the Talmud called Kutim that deals with the laws around forbidden and permitted interactions with Samaritans.

== See also ==
- Cuthah (Kutha), archaeological site, now in Babil, Iraq
- Nergal, deity worshiped in Cuthah
- Cuthean Legend of Naram-Sin
