= Cuthean Legend of Naram-Sin =

The Cuthean Legend of Naram-Sin is one of the few literary works whose versions are attested in both Old Babylonian, Middle Babylonian and the Standard Babylonian of the late Neo-Babylonian period, a literary life of around 1,500 years. It seems to have earlier been titled ṭupšenna pitēma, or "Open the Tablet Box" after its incipit (opening line) and was re-titled Naram-Sin and the Enemy Hordes, after its subject matter by its last Babylonian editor.

It is named after Naram-Sin of Akkad – a prominent monarch of the late 3rd millennium BCE, under whose suzerainty the Akkadian Empire reached its zenith - and the Cutheans (or inhabitants of Kutha). The Cuthean Legend is a morality tale told for didactic purposes, rather than an epic grounded in historical events. In this respect it is unlike, for example, similar works like The Great Revolt Against Naram-Sin. The Cuthean Legend follows a traditional tripartite structure: introduction, narrative of events, blessing/cursing formula, common among similar pseudo-autobiographical narû-literature. Naram-Sin is the protagonist and his foes are the Umman Manda (or Ummān-Manda), variously described as Hurrians from Malgium, cave-dwellers and demonic bird-like creatures, depending on which version of the epic is consulted.

== The text ==
The tale evolved over time while the actual text seems to have shrunk from a two-tablet epic of 600 lines in the Old Babylonian period to a single tablet of 180 lines in the late period, albeit with lines lengthier than the short truncated ones of the earlier period.

It opens:

ṭupšenna pitēma narâ šitassi
ša anāku Narām-Sîn mār Šarru-kīn
išṭurūma ēzibūšu ana ūmē ṣâti

Open the tablet-box and read out the stela,
Which I, Naram-Sin, 'son' of Sargon,
Have inscribed and left for future days.

— lines 1-3

The text then harkens back to the time of Enmerkar, the legendary Sumerian founder of Uruk, who offended the gods by not heeding their omens and whose failure to leave a memorial of his achievements caused Naram-Sin to be unable to pray for him.

The enemy hordes are created by the great gods, with Belet-ili their progenitress and Tiamat their wet nurse. Led by seven kings, and numbering 360,000 troops, the hordes begin their conquests of the Mesopotamian hinterlands. Naram-Sin dispatches a scout to prick them with a pin to determine whether they bleed. This he confirms concluding that they are mortal. He conducts extispicy with seven sacrificial lambs representing each of the antagonists' kings. Receiving an unfavorable omen, in an act of sheer hubris he brazenly repudiates it, "I will cast aside that (oracle) of the gods; I will be in control of myself" and sends forth three armies over three years, each one of which is annihilated.

Naram-Sin sinks into a deep depression in which he doubts his legacy. At the New Year's Festival, he promises to mend his ways, acting only in accordance with the will of the gods. He receives assent to pursue enemy soldiers and captures 12 of them, but, in obedience with the will of the gods, does not punish them. Once again, he consults the diviners with seven lambs but this time does not disregard its outcome. Ishtar warns: "Destroy not the brood of destruction! In future days, Enlil will summon them for evil." In a long passage she describes their purpose.

Finally, Naram-Sin admonishes future rulers, describing his warning to them to heed the omens of the gods, recorded on a stela in a tablet box which he left in the Emeslam, Nergal's temple in Kutha, to protect themselves but at all costs to avoid or appease the hordes of Enlil. He concludes with a call for pacifism, to "tie up your weapons and set(them) in the corners!", ignoring enemies that might ravage their lands and to leave an account of their lives for posterity.

It concludes:

šūt narē a tāmurūma
pūtka tušēṣû
šūt jāši taktarba arkû
litarrabka kāša

You who have read my inscription
and thus have gotten yourself out (of trouble)
you who have blessed me, may a future (ruler)
Bless you!

— lines 177-180

== Literature ==
- Mitto, T. D. N. (2022). Cuthaean Legend of Narām-Sîn. With contributions by Z. J. Földi, A. C. Heinrich, A. Hätinen and E. Jiménez. Translated by Benjamin R. Foster. electronic Babylonian Library. https://doi.org/10.5282/ebl/l/1/12
