= Lagaba =

Lagaba was a city in the historical region of southern Mesopotamia (now southern Iraq). It is the place of origin of many illicitly excavated clay tablets, all in Old Babylonian. More than 400 tablets are known to have originated there. Tablets from Lagaba are kept in various collections around the world, among which

- the Babylonian Collection at Yale University. Tablets from the Yale Babylonian Collection have been published by G.M. Beckman in the Catalogue of the YBC and by Oded Tammuz of Ben Gurion University many dated to the reign of Samsuiluna,
- the Böhl Collection at The Netherlands Institute for the Near East at Leiden University,
- the Ashmolean Museum in Oxford,
- various others.

Most of the known Lagaba tablets are from the Old Babylonian period. In the time of Sumu-la-El (c. 1880-1845 BC), ruler of the First Babylonian empire, the ruler of Lagaba was Mutumme-El. After a long period of control by Babylon the year names of the next to last ruler of that empire Samsu-iluna (c. 1750-1712 BC) ceased to be used in Lagaba in his year 30 suggesting that city, like others in the empire, had gained independence.

The tutelary god of Lagaba was Ishtar of Lagaba (Lagabītum, Bēlet-Lagaba, "Lady of Lagaba") though other gods were also worshiped there including Nabu and Laṣ. It has been suggested that this god corresponds to Lakuppītu who is worshiped in Isin.

== Location ==
The precise location of Lagaba is unknown to this day. The first thorough investigation into the location of Lagaba was undertaken by Leemans, on the basis of tablets kept in Leiden, suggesting that Lagaba lay on a waterway (possibly the Shatt en-Nil canal) between Babylon and Kutha in the vicinity of Kutha. By reviewing a tablet from Lagaba kept in Yale, Tammuz in 1996 concluded it to be 15 km North-north-east of the city of Babylon, on the western bank of the Euphrates River.

== See also ==
- Cities of the ancient Near East
- List of Mesopotamian deities
- Epithets of Inanna
