= Sebitti =

Minor war gods in ancient Mesopotamia

The Sebitti or Sebittu are a group of seven minor war gods in Neo-Sumerian, Akkadian, Babylonian and especially Assyrian tradition. They also appear in sources from Emar. Multiple different interpretations of the term occur in Mesopotamian literature.

== Description ==
The word Sebitti and its multiple variations are typically translated with a meaning along the lines of "the seven", "group of seven" or "the seven of them". They are always presented as masculine deities, and are kin in one way or another (either brothers or half brothers). Their most prominent characteristic across all versions, is their warlike nature.

== Variations ==
Assyriologist Frans Wiggermann enumerates the following known identities of this group:

=== Anthropomorphized Pleiades ===
The Sebitti can be anthropomorphic representation, of the Pleiades or another stellar or atmospheric phenomenon.

=== Sons of Enmešarra ===
The Sebitti can appear as sons of Enmešarra, a poorly known antagonistic figure known from some myths about Enlil, Ninurta and Marduk. Some texts refer to the group as "the great gods", a name they share with the seven sons whom they can be identified with.

In one, very late (Seleucid or Parthian period has been proposed), myth they are portrayed as enemies of the gods and sons of Enmešarra, who seemingly desired to obtain Marduk' power and position. The narrative presents their defeat, and death at the hands of Nergal and Marduk, portrayed as allies.

=== Foreign gods ===
Groups of foreign gods, such as the "divine seven of Elam" from the list An-Anum associated with the goddess Narunde (identified as their sister) and the obscure god Zamahhunde (identified as "their jester")

=== Minor war gods of Neo-Assyrian Empire ===
As minor gods in the state pantheon of the Neo-Assyrian Empire, the Sebitti were called upon all there to assist kings in their conquests, and "smite his enemies", their sigils would appear on chariots along with those of other astral beings.

=== Enemies of Ninurta ===
From the god list An=Anum, one group of "Seven Warriors" are identified with the Sebitti, typically as monsters subjugated by Ninurta.

=== Weapons or servants of Erra ===
The Seven appear as characters in the Erra Epic, a text from the early first millennium that describes the titular god Erra (Nergal), going on a warpath and sacking Babylon. In this narrative they are creations of Anu and follow the god into battle as his weapons and "peerless warriors".

=== Sons of Išḫara ===
In one text describing a ritual to protect a house, the Sebitti are named as sons of Išḫara (a possible mistaken reference to Išḫara in place of Enmešarra.)

According to Wiggermann these categories could overlap, ex. in a ritual meant to protect the house from demonic beings the gods are identified as both, sons of Enmešarra and brothers of Narunde, while elsewhere the brothers of Narunde were the sons of Anu.

=== Other potential versions ===
A Sumerian Hymn of Hendursaga, a god of the night and an afterlife guide, contains reference to a group of seven warriors, one of three heptads that work as assistants to the god. These seven are described as being animalistic, each having features of an animal. (fox, dog, raven, wolf, vulture, owl, and shark) As proposed by Lorenzo Verderame, this group is likely related to the later occurring Sebitti.

== Iconography ==
Sigils from the first and second millennium that are thought to represent both the Pleiades, and the Sebitti were groups of seven dots, sometimes with four or six dots paired, or with three pairs and one single loose dot.

There are also the anthropomorphic statues of the seven used in magic ritual, procured, and decorated for use around the home. Unfortunately these statues were made from wood, so while weapons have been recovered, full statues have decayed away. However texts describe in detail how these statues should have looked.

One describes the preparation of the statues, with them described as being mounted on a pedestal of tamarisk posed as if they were walking. Each would be given a crown, garment, weapons (hatchet in the right hand, dagger in the left), a bronze girdle and headband, horns for their crown, and a bow and quiver to hang at their side. The statue would be painted with a red paste to finish.

The seven can appear on relief, in a similar walking pose with the same weapons and garments.

== Worship ==
There is evidence for small cults of the Sebitti being active in the Neo-Sumerian period, but the group came to full prominence in the first millennium of Assyria, where the heptad was incorporated into the official pantheon of the state. Unlike many other deities of this time, their role and purpose from that point was shaped greatly by the state, and not mythological tradition.

=== Apotropaic rituals ===
The Sebitti have a well attested use in Neo-Assyrian white magic, often involved in complex rituals to protect the home and its inhabitants. Ritual texts describe the preparation of Sebitti statues for this purpose. Each statue was carved from wood and armed with a bronze or copper hatchet, dagger, and bow hanging from the shoulder. These figures could be buried under the gate, speculated as them acting along with Nergal and other death/underworld gods Lugal-irra and Meslamta-ea to halt the advance of evil into the home. Incantations would be chanted over the statues, calling upon their warrior prowess.

The statues could also be placed at the head of the bed with the previous gods, their sister Narunde, and an Ugallu demon. One text involving their placement at the head of the bed specifically dealt with repelling illness from the man who lied there, where they were placed alongside Apkallu sage figures.

The Sebitti also appear in Assyrian palaces alongside other protector demons and deities, in relief along the walls of the palace. Two plaques from the palace of Assurbanipal likely contain the group, one with three gods and the opposite with four. Each are armed with a hatchet and a dagger.

The group has made appearances in Exorcistic ritual as well. One text describes the exorcist as being "protected at all sides" by the gods, including the Heptad.

== Theories of origin and history ==
The first known references to the group were in their connection and relation to the Pleiades, where they were worshipped as "the Seven Warriors" in a temple open to the elements where offerings were made to astral deities. By the first millennium in Assyria their cult was prominent, and there is some reference to them in the Babylonian sphere as well, though there they were considerably rarer.
