= Mamitu =

Mesopotamian goddess

- Underworld goddess
- Major cult center: Kutha

Genealogy
- Spouse: Nergal or Erra

Equivalents
- Mandean: Amamit

Mamitu (Mammitum, Mammitu, Mammi) was a Mesopotamian goddess associated with the underworld. She was regarded as the wife of Nergal, or sometimes of other gods regarded as analogous to him, such as Erra. Her importance in Mesopotamian religion was minor, and she was most likely worshiped primarily in Kutha, though attestations are available from other cities too. It is possible that she was a forerunner of the Mandean Amamit.

== Name and character ==
Multiple variants of the theonym Mamitu are attested in cuneiform texts, including ^{(d)}ma-ma, ^{d}ma-mi and ^{d}ma-mi-tum. As the short form of her name is homophonous with Mami, a goddess of birth or "divine midwife", (Note: Another being from Mesopotamian beliefs with a homophonous name was māmītu, a type of underworld demon with a goat's head and human hands and feet, known from the late text Underworld Vision of an Assyrian Prince and absent from other sources. Unlike deities, who were generally fully anthropomorphic in Mesopotamian beliefs, demonic beings were often hybrids.) some researchers treat them as one deity. However, while in theophoric names with elements such as ma-ma the identification of the deity invoked is not always possible, they are kept apart in ancient Mesopotamian god lists, such as the Weidner god list, the Nippur god list and both An = Anum and its Old Babylonian forerunner. Longer forms of the name, such as Mammītu, with the exception of a single passage from the Epic of Gilgamesh were never used to refer to Mami or any analogous deity. The goddess Mammītu who is responsible for the declaration of destiny alongside "Anunnaku, the great gods" in this composition (tablet X, lines 319–322) is commonly identified as Mami rather than Mammitum by modern translators. The opposite approach was common in early editions, but Rim Nurullin points out that the parallel passage in Atrahasis confirms that this interpretation is incorrect.

It has been suggested that like in the case of Mami, Mamitu's name goes back to a lallwort for mother, though it is also possible that might instead derive from the terms "oath" or "frost" (Akkadian mammû; also "ice"). If the last of these possibilities is correct, its meaning might be "wintry".

Mamitu was associated with the underworld.

== Associations with other deities ==
As already attested in Old Babylonian sources, Mammitum's spouse was Nergal. Wilfred G. Lambert noted that pairing them with each other was standard in this period, but from the Kassite period onward Mamitu came to be replaced by Laṣ. The god list An = Anum mentions both of them and equates them with each other. However, in Nippur god list Laṣ occurs separately from Nergal, while Mamitum is listed alongside him. It is possible that they coexisted in Kutha in the second millennium BCE. While a further goddess, Ereshkigal, could also be regarded as the wife of Nergal, there is no evidence that she was ever equated with Mamitu.

Mamitu could also be regarded as the wife of Erra, who came to be identified with Nergal from the Old Babylonian period onward. In the Epic of Erra, she appears as the wife of the eponymous god, though in this text he is referred both as Erra and Nergal at various points. An = Anum also refers to her as the wife of Meslamtaea, though in this context he is directly identified with Nergal.

Douglas Frayne has proposed that in Tell al-Wilayah in the Ur III period Mamitu was regarded as the spouse of the local god Aški, who he interprets as an early form of Ḫuškia (later attested as a byname of Nergal; An = Anum, tablet VI line 5), as opposed to an alternate writing of Ashgi as sometimes suggested.

Cinzia Pappi argues that the name of the goddess Taški(m)-Mamma is a theophoric name, possibly one originally belonging to a ruler, and that based on apparent connection to the underworld and groundwater she displays it can be presumed that it invokes Mamitu, rather than Mami. This deity is known from texts from Mari, where she was already worshiped in the Šakkanakku period. She also received offerings during the reign of Zimri-Lim, and textual sources indicate a temple dedicated to her existed in the city.

== Worship ==
The earliest possible attestations of Mamitu occur in theophoric names from the Early Dynastic and Old Akkadian periods with elements such as ma-ma, which also occur in both Akkadian and Amorite onomasticon in later periods, though the identification of the deity invoked in them with certainty is impossible. According to Marcos Such-Gutiérrez, it can be presumed that Mamitu appears in two names from Adab from between the Old Akkadian and Ur III periods, as the theophoric element is spelled as ma-mi-tum in this case. According to Douglas Frayne, names invoking her occur commonly in texts from Tell al-Wilayah from the Ur III period. Cinzia Pappi argues that she appears in theophoric names from Old Babylonian Mari as well. However, according to Ichiro Nakata ^{d}ma-ma and ^{d}ma-am-ma most likely represent the divine midwife Mami in this text corpus. Examples of Akkadian theophoric names invoking Mammitum are also known from Susa from the same period. However, Christa Müller-Kessler and Karlheinz Kessler state that ultimately she was entirely unknown outside of Mesopotamia.

Mamitu's importance in Mesopotamian religion was minor. In the Old Babylonian period she received offerings in the Ekur temple complex in Nippur alongside Nergal. However, most likely her significance was limited to Kutha and its immediate surroundings. Frans Wiggermann argues that she was initially introduced to the local pantheon alongside Erra. She continued to be worshiped there until the first millennium BCE. A hymn to Nanaya most likely composed no later than 744-734 BCE which enumerates goddesses of various cities lists Mamitu as the deity Kutha. The last available attestation of her from this city are theophoric names in a Hellenistic text dated to the year 226 BCE, though the evaluation of the scope of her cult is difficult as few cuneiform texts from late periods have been recovered from this site. She was also worshiped in Babylon. In a new year ritual from this city which according to Wilfred G. Lambert predates the reign of Nebuchadnezzar I and the rise of Marduk to the position of the head of the Mesopotamian pantheon which enumerates deities arriving in the akitu building, Mamitu is listed as one of the deities from Kutha alongside Nergal and Laṣ, next to Marduk, Zarpanitu and members of the pantheons of Kish (Zababa and Bau) and Borsippa (Nabu, Nanaya and Sutītu). She was also worshiped in Babylon in later periods, as evidenced by attestations of theophoric names invoking her in two texts dated to the 23rd year of the reign of Nebuchadnezzar II (Mammitu-silim) and the sixth year of the reign of Cyrus (Mammitu-silat), respectively.

== Later relevance ==
It is possible that due to the cult of Mamitu retaining a degree of importance in both Babylon and Kutha in late periods, she came to be incorporated into Mandaean tradition. (Note: It has been noted that early Mandaic sources show influence from the traditions of the area including these two cities and Borsippa in particular, while figures and traditions associated with other ancient Mesopotamian cities, such as Kish, Nippur or Uruk, find no parallels in them.) Christa Müller-Kessler and Karlheinz Kessler propose that Mamitu corresponds to Amamit (ˀmˀmyt, less commonly mˀmyt), who is attested as a demon in the fifth book of the Ginzā Yamina. Amamit is described as a daughter of Qin and spouse of Zartai-Zartanai, and her name can also function as an epithet of Libat, the planet Venus.
