= Lugal-irra and Meslamta-ea =

Pair of Mesopotamian gods

- Pair of warrior gods, guardians of doors and gatekeepers of the underworld
- Major cult center: Kisiga, Dūrum
- Weapons: bow and arrows (Lugal-irra); mace and axe (Meslamta-ea)
- Animals: black raven (Lugal-irra); white raven (Meslamta-ea)

Genealogy
- Spouse: Ku'annesi (Lugal-irra; disputed); Ninshubur (disputed) or Mamitu (Meslamta-ea)

Lugal-irra (𒀭𒈗𒄊𒊏) and Meslamta-ea (𒀭𒈩𒇴𒋫𒌓𒁺𒀀) were a pair of Mesopotamian gods who typically appear together in cuneiform texts and were described as the "divine twins" (Maštabba). They were regarded as warrior gods and as protectors of doors, possibly due to their role as the gatekeepers of the underworld. In Mesopotamian astronomy they came to be associated with a pair of stars known as the "Great Twins", Alpha Geminorum and Beta Geminorum. They were both closely associated with Nergal, and could be either regarded as members of his court or equated with him. Their cult centers were Kisiga and Dūrum. While no major sanctuaries dedicated to them are attested elsewhere, they were nonetheless worshiped in multiple other cities.

== Names ==
Lugal-irra and Meslamta-ea usually appear together in Mesopotamian texts. Typically Lugal-irra was followed by Meslamta-ea, though instances of the order being reversed are known too. While attestations of Lugal-irra without Meslamta-ea are known, they are considered unusual.

=== Lugalirra ===
Lugal-irra's name was most commonly written in cuneiform as ^{d}Lugal-GÌR-ra. It can be romanized as Lugalirra as well. It has Sumerian origin and can be translated as "the strong lord". The variant Lugal-girra, ^{d}Lugal-gír-ra, reflects a late reinterpretation of the name as "lord of the dagger" and is no longer considered an indication that ^{d}Lugal-GÌR-ra was ever read as Lugal-girra. Despite the phonetic similarity, the second half of Lugal-irra's name is most likely unrelated to the theonym Erra (variant: Irra), and its Akkadian translation was gašru according to lexical lists.

=== Meslamtaea ===
The most common spelling of Meslamta-ea's name in cuneiform was ^{d}Mes-lam-ta-è(-a). It can be romanized as Meslamtaea as well. It can be translated as "he who came out of Meslam" or "he who comes out of Meslam". Meslam is well attested as the name, or element of the name, of multiple temples of Nergal and related deities, with the most famous of them, the E-Meslam, being located in Kutha.

=== ^{d}MAŠ.TAB.BA and analogous terms ===
The term Maštabba, ^{d}Maš-tab-ba, is a Sumerian phrase meaning "the divine twins", derived from the regular term for twins. (Note: Today the derived label "divine twins" (Zwillingsgottheiten) is chiefly used in Assyriology to refer to pairs of deities identified with pairs of stars.) As a theonym is first attested in an offering list from Mari from the Šakkanakku period, where it occurs between Nisaba and ^{d}Ba-AḪ (the deified Balikh River), and in a contemporary texts from Sippar known from a Neo-Babylonian copy where this pair is placed between ^{d}ÍD (deified river or river ordeal) and Ištaran. It could function as an epithet of Lugal-irra and Meslamta-ea. The pair could also be referred to with the Sumerian phrase dingir-min-a-bi, "the twin gods", a synonym of the theonym Maštabba.

== Character and iconography ==
Lugal-irra and Meslamta-ea were regarded as warrior deities. In early sources from the end of the Ur III period both of them were associated with judgment, especially with river ordeal. They were also regarded as guardians of doorways. The incantation series Maqlû describes them as “guard-gods who tear out the heart and compress the kidneys”. Typically Lugal-irra was associated with the right side and Meslamta-ea with the left. It has been argued that this role reflected their status as gatekeepers of the underworld, which made it appropriate to also entrust other gates to them. In addition to regularly playing this role in Mesopotamian sources, in a single case Lugal-irra is also attested as a protector of doors in a Hittite ritual presumably adapted from a Babylonian original, KBo 15, 2, which prescribes the preparation of a figure representing him for that purpose.

Astronomical texts, such as the compendium MUL.APIN, identify Lugal-irra and Meslamta-ea with a pair of stars known as the "Great Twins", ^{mul}MAŠ.TAB.BA.GAL. It corresponded to Alpha Geminorum and Beta Geminorum. The analogous name "Little Twins" (^{mul}MAŠ.TAB.BA.TUR.TUR) was used to refer to Alammuš and Ningublaga. This pair in turn can be identified as Delta Geminorum and Zeta Geminorum. The text KAR 142, a list of various heptads, lists them alongside five further pairs of such twin deities in addition to the Great Twins and the Little Twins, including the "twins of Papsukkal" (here a constellation corresponding to Orion), Shullat and Hanish, Šarur and Šargaz, ^{mul}KU-an-na and ^{mul}KU-ki-SIKIL^{lum} (possibly related to Lisin and Ninsikila's children KU-anna and KU-kita), and Ninnisig and Erragal.

An instruction for the preparation of apotropaic figures states that the representation of Lugal-irra should hold a bow and arrows, while Meslamtaea an axe (in his left hand) and a mace (in his right hand). The terms used, ḫutpalû and zaḫaṭû, more specifically indicate the weapons were a mace with a stone head and a single bladed axe. Furthermore, the statuettes of Meslamta-ea were decorated with "black paste" (IM.GI_{6}, an unidentified substance), and these representing Lugal-irra possibly with a bright pigment. The statuettes wore garments known as tillû and horned headdress. Neo-Assyrian sources indicate that they were buried under entrances to buildings.

A hymn refers to Lugal-irra and Meslamta-ea as a pair of ravens, respectively black and white, though the basis for this association is unknown.

== Associations with other deities ==
Lugal-irra and Meslamta-ea were both closely associated with Nergal. They could be considered members of his court. Both of them could be directly identified with him as well. It is presumed that while Meslamta-ea could be treated as a distinct god, was initially an epithet of Nergal used to refer to him in cities located to the south of Kutha up to the Ur III period. However, Dina Katz argues that he was a distinct deity in origin, and only came to be syncretised with Nergal at some point. The identification between Nergal and Lugal-irra was a late phenomenon, and the fact that the former could be referred to with the same epithet as the latter, dingir irra ("strong god"), is not an indication of equivalence as it was applied to many deities. Instances of the pair being identified as Sin and Nergal are known too, with the connection of the latter two being their shared status as sons of Enlil. The equation between Lugal-irra and Sin might depend on references to the latter acting as a judge in the underworld. It is presumed that the connection between the pair and Nergal is the reason why the logograms ^{d}MAŠ.TAB.BA and its variant ^{d}MAŠ.MAŠ were sometimes used to render his name.

According to Wilfred G. Lambert, the wife of Lugal-irra was Ku'annesi, while Meslamta-ea was associated with either Ninshubur or Mamitu. However, the connection between the pair and Ku'annesi and Ninshubur is only documented in a single Old Babylonian god list, and it is not certain if it necessarily implies they were regarded as couples. (Note: Frans Wiggermann treats this reference to Ninshubur as one of the attestations of her and Nergal (or Meslamta-ea treated as his epithet) as a couple instead.) Their respective divine "viziers" (sukkal) were Zi-mingi (or ^{d}Zi-MU) and Zi-ĝara, though a single god list postdating the Old Babylonian period instead equates this pair with them. In texts belonging to this genre Lugal-irra and Meslamta-ea could also be identified with other pairs of twin deities, presumably originating in the peripheries of Mesopotamia, including Almu and Alamu, Birdu and Šarrabu, (Note: These two gods were Amorite deities according to Wilfred G. Lambert.) and two other duos whose names are only partially preserved. An = Anum additionally refers to the deity Ḫar as the messenger of the pair, though this tradition is not documented elsewhere.

According to Paul-Alain Beaulieu Gašru, a god worshiped in Mesopotamia in Opis and Mari, as well as further west in Emar and Ugarit, could be considered a form of Lugal-irra.

== Worship ==
=== Kisiga and Dūrum ===
The oldest known references to Lugal-irra and Meslamta-ea as a pair have been identified in hymns from the reign of Ibbi-Sin, the last king from the Third Dynasty of Ur, which indicate at the time their cult center was Kisiga (Kišaga). It is not certain if it was identical with Kissik known from sources from the first millennium BCE.

Texts from the reign of Sîn-kāšid of Uruk refer to Dūrum as the cult center of Lugal-irra and Meslamta-ea. His inscriptions mention the renovation of the temples E-Meslam-melamilla ("E-Meslam which bears radiance"), dedicated to Meslamta-ea, and E-niḫušgurusuzilla ("house clad in awesome terror, bearing radiance"), dedicated to Lugal-irra. A literary letter attributed to his daughter Ninšatapada, who served as a high priestess of Meslamta-ea, mentions a temple dedicated jointly to the pair named E-Meslam, which might be either an abbreviation of E-Meslam-melamilla or the name of a temple complex rather than a single house of worship. Relying on the fact that Lugal-irra and Meslamta-ea were only associated with Old Babylonian Dūrum, and not with Neo-Babylonian Dūru, which was a cult center of Sin and his wife Ningal instead, Paul-Alain Beaulieu suggests that these two toponyms referred to different settlements. He proposes that Dūrum might have been renamed Udannu, or alternatively that cults native to it might have at some point been transferred to the latter city. He points out that in Neo-Babylonian period two deities represented by the logogram ^{d}IGI.DU were worshiped there, and proposed a connection between them and Lugal-irra and Meslamta-ea. (Note: ^{d}IGI.DU was often used as a logographic writing of Nergal's name in late sources, though much about the use of this logogram and deities who could be designated by it remains unclear.) Odette Boivin suggests that Lugal-irra's presence in the archive of the First Sealand dynasty was tied to his position in Dūrum and Udannu. He is attested without Meslamta-ea in a number of offering lists, though his position in them varies. Sometimes he is placed next to Nergal. Boivin argues his relative importance in the Sealand texts might indicate that the center of this kingdom was located close to Udannu. However, she notes that he is attested alone, without Meslamta-ea, which is unusual. He received offerings referred to as nindabû, possibly held to celebrate the full moon, similarly as the Sebitti and Nanshe.

According to Wilfred G. Lambert there is no evidence that any major sanctuaries of Lugal-irra and Meslamta-ea as a pair existed outside of Dūrum and Kisiga.

=== Other cities ===
The Canonical Temple List assigns the E-melamsulimgurru ("house clad in fearsome radiance"), possibly located in Ur, to Meslamta-ea. A house of worship bearing the same name (or a chapel within the temple of another deity), presumably identical with it, occurs in a topographical text which most likely originated in said city, though there it is described as dedicated to both Lugal-irra and Meslamta-ea. The same source lists the ceremonial names of their respective seats, Bara-šadišša ("dais of the perfect one") and E-ḫursag-siga ("house of the silent mountain"). The Canonical Temple List also mentions a further temple dedicated jointly to the pair, E-sulimgurruede ("house clad in awesome radiance"), though its location is unknown.

In Babylon Lugal-Irra and Meslamta-ea were worshiped in Erabriri, "house of the shackle which holds in check", the temple of Mandanu. Their seat in it was known under the ceremonial name E-melamḫuš, "house of awesome radiance". (Note: Not to be confused with the identically named temple of Nuska in Nippur.) At least in the seventh century BCE, a temple dedicated to Lugal-irra existed in the city too. Additionally, 180 "stations" dedicated jointly to him and Meslamtaea are known from Tintir = Babylon, (Note: Also called Topography of Babylon in older publications.) a commonly copied late topographical text. These were presumably small structures, much like the shrines of Ishtar, Sebitti, the deified rainbow (Manzat) and other figures mentioned in the same section. The same source states that one of the gates of Babylon was named after Lugal-irra. He also had a temple whose ceremonial name is unknown in Luḫatu in the proximity of Babylon.

In Nippur in the Old Babylonian period Lugal-irra and Meslamta-ea were regarded as the divine doorkeepers of the temple of Nuska, where they received offerings. The Nippur Compendium, known from copies from the Neo-Assyrian and Neo-Babylonian periods and later, lists them among the deities venerated in the local temple of Nergal, alongside Erra, Erragal and Damu.

A single text from the reign of Rîm-Anum of Uruk might indicate that Lugal-irra and Meslamta-ea were worshiped there in the Old Babylonian period. They are also attested in sources from this city from the Neo-Babylonian period. Lugal-irra was worshiped at this time in one of the ekurrātu, small independent sanctuaries located in the city or in its proximity. A street named after him is also attested. It is uncertain if Meslamta-ea was also actively worshiped in Uruk in the Neo-Babylonian period, as he is only attested in the name of a city gate. Both Lugal-irra and Meslamta-ea were also venerated in Uruk in the Seleucid period. The text KAR 132, an instruction for the akītu of Anu, mentions them among deities invoked during these celebrations.
