= Erra (god) =

8th century BCE Akkadian plague god

Erra amulet
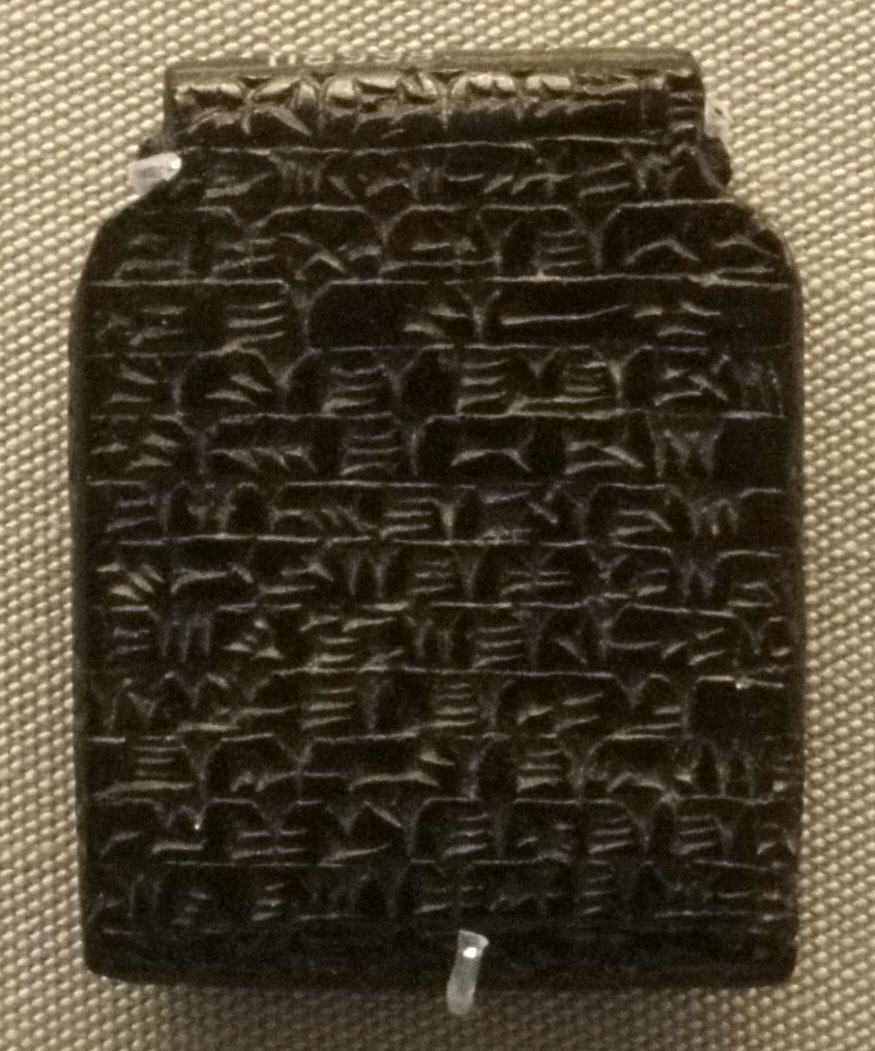
- Amulet to ward off plague inscribed with a quotation from the Akkadian Erra Epic.
- Material: Stone, copper
- Size: L:1.81 in (4.6 cm); W:1.25 in (3.2 cm)
- Created: 800–612 BCE
- Period/culture: Neo-Assyrian
- Place: Ashur
- Present location: Room 55, British Museum, London
- Identification: 118998

Erra (sometimes called Irra) is an Akkadian plague god known from an 'epos' of the eighth century BCE. Erra is the god of mayhem and pestilence who is responsible for periods of political confusion. He was assimilated to Nergal at some point.

== Epoca de Erra ==
In the epic that is given the modern title Erra, the writer Kabti-ilani-Marduk, a descendant, he says, of Dabibi, presents himself in a colophon following the text as simply the transcriber of a visionary dream in which Erra himself revealed the text.

The poem opens with an invocation. The god Erra is sleeping fitfully with his consort (identified with Mamītum and not with the mother goddess Mami) but is roused by his advisor Išum and the Seven (Sibitti or Sebetti), who are the sons of heaven and earth—"champions without peer" is the repeated formula—and are each assigned a destructive destiny by Anu. Machinist and Sasson (1983) call them "personified weapons". The Sibitti call on Erra to lead the destruction of mankind. Išum tries to mollify Erra's wakened violence, to no avail. Foreign peoples invade Babylonia, but are struck down by plague. Even Marduk, the patron of Babylon, relinquishes his throne to Erra for a time. Tablets II and III are occupied with a debate between Erra and Išum. Erra goes to battle in Babylon, Sippar, Uruk, Dūr-Kurigalzu and Dēr. The world is turned upside down: righteous and unrighteous are killed alike. Erra orders Išum to complete the work by defeating Babylon's enemies. Then the god withdraws to his own seat in Emeslam with the terrifying Seven, and mankind is saved. A propitiatory prayer ends the work.

The poem must have been central to Babylonian culture: at least thirty-six copies have been recovered from five first-millennium sites—Assur, Babylon, Nineveh, Sultantepe and Ur—more, even, as the assyriologist and historian of religions Luigi Giovanni Cagni points out, than have been recovered of the Epic of Gilgamesh.

The text appears to some readers to be a mythologisation of historic turmoil in Mesopotamia, though scholars disagree as to the historic events that inspired the poem: the poet exclaims (tablet IV:3) "You changed out of your divinity and made yourself like a man."

The Erra text soon assumed magical functions Parts of the text were inscribed on amulets employed for exorcism and as a prophylactic against the plague. The Seven are known from a range of Akkadian incantation texts: their demonic names vary, but their number, seven, is invariable.

The five tablets containing the Erra epos were first published in 1956, with an improved text, based on additional finds, appearing in 1969. Perhaps 70% of the poem has been recovered.

Walter Burkert noted the consonance of the purely mythic seven led by Erra with the Seven against Thebes, widely assumed by Hellenists to have had a historical basis.

The Erra and Ishum epic also makes mention and references the flood myth, a reinterpretation of the story in Atrahasis.

== See also ==
- Religion in Mesopotamia
