= Dimmeku =

Mesopotamian goddess

- Deity or demon associated with the underworld
- Other names: Dimku, Ḫedimku, Ḫedimmeku (disputed)
- Parents: Namtar and Hušbiša

Dimmeku (also read as Dimpimeku), Dimku or Ḫedimku was a Mesopotamian goddess or demon associated with the underworld. From the Old Babylonian period on she was associated with Namtar, and in the god list An = Anum she appears as his daughter. It has been suggested that the similarly named Ḫedimmeku, who is attested in the same source as a daughter of Enki, was identical with her, though this conclusion is not universally accepted.

== Name and character ==
The oldest variants of the name, ^{d}dìm-PI-ku (^{d.dìm}dimme-ku) from the compositions The Death of Ur-Namma and The Death of Gilgamesh and ^{d}dìm-PI.ME-ku (^{d.dìm}dimme^{me}-ku) from the Nippur god list, according to Dina Katz should be read as Dimmeku. This conclusion is also supported by Jeremiah Peterson. However, the readings Dimpiku and Dimpimeku can be found in older literature. In the incantation series Udug-hul the form ^{d}dìm-kù, Dimku, occurs. Later sources spell the name as ^{d}ḫé-dìm-kù, which is presumed to be a variant or a result of textual corruption.

Dina Katz proposes that the element dìm is used in the name Dimmeku in the meaning "figurine", and on this basis suggests that the name initially referred to a deified statue related to the worship of another deity, possibly Ningishzida, rather than to a distinct member of the Mesopotamian pantheon. However, according to Andrew R. George it can be assumed that Dimmeku was already regarded as a distinct underworld deity at the time of composition of The Death of Ur-Namma and The Death of Gilgamesh.

According to Jeremiah Peterson, it is possible to classify Dimmeku both as a deity and a demon.

== Associations with other deities ==
In the god list An = Anum (tablet V, line 203) Dimmeku is described as Namtar's daughter. It is presumed that Namtar's wife Hušbiša was regarded as her mother. Like her parents, she is included among the deities forming the court of Ereshkigal. Namtar, Hušbiša and Dimmeku also occur in sequence in the exorcistic incantation Gattung II alongside other underworld deities, after Lugal-irra, Meslamtaea, Nergal, Ereshkigal, Ninazu, Ningirida, Ningishzida, Azimua and Geshtinanna, and before Nirda (deified punishment), Bitu, Šaršarbida, Etana, Gilgamesh, Lugalamašpae and Ugur. However, while Dimmeku occurs in association with Namtar in Old Babylonian texts already, the specific tradition making them father and daughter is absent from sources predating An = Anum, and Dina Katz argues that based on her placement in The Death of Ur-Namma it can be assumed she was initially associated with Ningishzida. In the aforementioned text, she is described as "standing by the side of Ningishzida". Katz argues that this association is also reflected by her placement in the Old Babylonian Nippur god list. She is the ninety-second entry, and occurs in a section focused on underworld deities, between Azimua and Ninazu.

Wilfred G. Lambert assumed that Namtar's daughter was identical with the goddess Ḫedimmeku (^{d}ḫé-dìm-me-kù), who occurs in An = Anum (tablet 2, line 274) as a daughter of Enki. He assumed that the same parentage is reflected by a reference to Dimmeku as daughter of the Apsû, known from the incantation series Udug-hul. Andrew R. George accepts Lambert's assumption, and notes the different parentages assigned to Dimmeku might reflect the phenomenon of occasional placement of deities associated with the underworld in Enki's court. However, Markham J. Geller argues that the deity from tablet II of An = Anum despite bearing a similar name is unrelated to Dimmeku.

== In literary texts ==
The earliest known attestation of Dimmeku occurs in the poem The Death of Ur-Namma, which might have been composed in the Ur III period, during the reign of Shulgi. She is listed as one of the deities the eponymous ruler makes offerings to immediately after arriving in the underworld. She received an object referred to as tudida, presumed to be an article of clothing. She is attested in a similar context in the composition The Death of Gilgamesh from the Old Babylonian period.
