= Nergal =

Mesopotamian god of death

- God of war, disease, and death
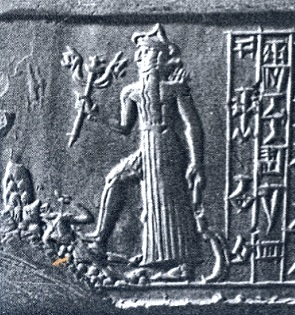
- Nergal holding his attributes—a lion-headed mace and a sword—on a cylinder seal from Larsa
- Major cult center: Kutha
- Abode: Kur (the Mesopotamian underworld)
- Planet: Mars
- Symbol: lion-headed mace, sword, lion, bull, possibly chameleon
- Number: 14

Genealogy
- Parents: Enlil and Ninlil
- Siblings: Nanna, Ninazu, Enbilulu (in the myth Enlil and Ninlil)
- Consort: Laṣ (most commonly); Mammitum (in Nippur and in Epic of Erra); Admu (in Mari); Ereshkigal (in the myth Nergal and Ereshkigal); Ninshubur (in Girsu in the third millennium BCE)
- Children: Tadmushtum

Equivalents
- Southern Mesopotamian: Ninazu
- Akkadian: Erra
- Eblaite and Ugaritic: Resheph
- Elamite: Simut
- Mandaean: Nirig

Nergal (Sumerian: 𒀭𒄊𒀕𒃲 ^{d}KIŠ.UNU or ^{d}GÌR.UNU.GAL; Hebrew: נֵרְגַל, Modern: Nerəgal, Tiberian: Nērəgal; Aramaic: ܢܸܪܓܲܠ; Latin: Nirgal) was a Mesopotamian god worshiped through all periods of Mesopotamian history, from Early Dynastic to Neo-Babylonian times, with a few attestations indicating that his cult survived into the period of Achaemenid domination. He was primarily associated with war, death, and disease, and has been said to be the "god of inflicted death". He reigned over Kur, the Mesopotamian underworld, depending on the myth either on behalf of his parents Enlil and Ninlil, or in later periods as a result of his marriage with the goddess Ereshkigal. Originally either Mammitum, a goddess possibly connected to frost, or Laṣ, sometimes assumed to be a minor medicine goddess, were regarded as his wife, though other traditions existed, too.

His primary cult center was Kutha, located in the north of historical Babylonia. His main temple bore the ceremonial name E-Meslam and he was also known by the name Meslamtaea, "he who comes out of Meslam". Initially he was only worshiped in the north, with a notable exception being Girsu during the reign of Gudea of Lagash, but starting with the Ur III period he became a major deity in the south too. He remained prominent in both Babylonia and Assyria in later periods, and in the Neo-Babylonian state pantheon he was regarded as the third most important god, after Marduk and Nabu.

Nergal was associated with a large number of local or foreign deities. The Akkadian god Erra was syncretised with him at an early date, and especially in literary texts they functioned as synonyms of each other. Other major deities frequently compared to or syncretised with him include the western god Resheph, best attested in Ebla and Ugarit, who was also a god of war, plague and death, and Elamite Simut, who was likely a warrior god and shared Nergal's association with the planet Mars. It has also been proposed that his name was used to represent a Hurrian god, possibly Kumarbi or Aštabi, in early inscriptions from Urkesh, but there is also evidence that he was worshiped by the Hurrians under his own name as one of the Mesopotamian deities they incorporated into their own pantheon.

Two well known myths focus on Nergal, Nergal and Ereshkigal and Epic of Erra. The former describes the circumstances of his marriage of Ereshkigal, the Mesopotamian goddess of the dead, while the latter describes his rampages and efforts of his sukkal (attendant deity) Ishum to stop them. He also appears in a number of other, less well-preserved compositions.

== Names and epithets ==
Nergal's name can be translated from Sumerian as "lord of the big city", a euphemistic way to refer to him as a ruler of the underworld. The earliest attested spelling is ^{d}KIŠ.UNU, with its standard derivative ^{d}KIŠ.UNU.GAL first attested in the Old Akkadian period. Since in the Old Babylonian period the cuneiform signs KIŠ and GÌR coalesced, transliterations using the latter in place of the former can also be found in literature. The variant ^{d}NIN.KIŠ.UNU, attested in an inscription of Naram-Sin of Akkad, resulted from the use of a derivative of Nergal's name, KIŠ.UNU, as an early logographic writing of the name of Kutha, his cult center.

Phonetic spellings of Nergal's name are attested in cuneiform (^{d}né-ri-ig-lá in Tell Leilan, ^{d}né-ri-ig-la in Nuzi), as well as in Aramaic (nrgl, nyrgl) and Hebrew (nēr^{e}gal in the Masoretic Text).

=== Meslamtaea and related logograms ===
Meslamtaea, "he who has come out of Meslam", was originally used as an alternative name of Nergal in the southern part of Lower Mesopotamia up to the Ur III period. It has been proposed that it was euphemistic and reflected the fact that Nergal initially could not be recognized as a ruler of the underworld in the south due to the existence of Ninazu (sometimes assumed to be the earliest Mesopotamian god of death) and Ereshkigal, and perhaps only served as a war deity. Meslamtaea with time also came to be used as the name of a separate deity. As attested for the first time in a hymn from the reign of Ibbi-Sin, he formed a pair with Lugalirra. Due to the connection between Nergal and these two gods, who could be regarded as a pair of twins, his own name could be represented by the logogram ^{d}MAŠ.TAB.BA and its variant ^{d}MAŠ.MAŠ, both of them originally meaning "(divine) twins". ^{d}MAŠ.MAŠ is attested in Neo-Assyrian theophoric names as a spelling of Nergal's name, though only uncommonly. However, the god designated by this logogram in one of the Amarna letters, written by the king of Alashiya, is most likely Resheph instead.

=== Erra ===
From the Old Babylonian period onward the name Erra, derived from the Semitic root ḥrr, and thus etymologically related to the Akkadian verb erēru, "to scorch", could be applied to Nergal, though it originally referred to a distinct god. The two of them started to be associated in the Old Babylonian period, were equated in the Weidner and An = Anum god lists, and appear to be synonyms of each other in literary texts (including the Epic of Erra and Nergal and Ereshkigal), where both names can occur side by side as designations of the same figure. However, while in other similar cases (Inanna and Ishtar, Enki and Ea) the Akkadian name eventually started to predominate over Sumerian, Erra was the less commonly used one, and there are also examples of late bilingual texts using Nergal's name in the Akkadian version and Erra's in the Sumerian translation, indicating it was viewed as antiquated and was not in common use. Theophoric names invoking Erra are only attested from Old Akkadian to Old Babylonian period, with most of the examples being Akkadian, though uncommonly Sumerian ones occur too. Despite his origin, he is absent from the inscriptions of rulers of the Akkadian Empire.

The similarity between the names of Erra and Lugal-irra is presumed to be accidental, and the element -irra in the latter is Sumerian and is conventionally translated as "mighty".

=== U.GUR ===
The logogram ^{d}U.GUR is the most commonly attested writing of Nergal's name from the Middle Babylonian period onward. This name initially belonged to Nergal's attendant deity (sukkal), and might be derived from the imperative form of Akkadian nāqaru, "destroy!". It has been noted that Ugur was replaced in his role by Ishum contemporarily with the spread of the use of ^{d}U.GUR as a writing of Nergal's name.

=== IGI.DU ===
^{d}IGI.DU is attested as a logographic representation of Nergal's name in Neo-Babylonian sources, with the reading confirmed by the alternation between it and ^{d}U.GUR in theophoric names. However, in a number of Assyrian texts ^{d}U.GUR and ^{d}IGI.DU appear as designations of two different deities, with the former being Nergal and the latter remaining unidentified. Authors such as Frans Wiggermann and Julia Krul argue it had the Akkadian reading Pālil. However, Manfred Krebernik states this remains unconfirmed. A deity designated by the logogram ^{d}IGI.DU was also worshiped in Uruk, with the earliest references coming from the reign of Sennacherib and the most recent from the Seleucid period, and according to Krul should be interpreted as "a form of Nergal". Paul-Alain Beaulieu instead argues that it is impossible to identify him as Nergal, as both of them appear alongside Ninurta as a trio of distinct deities in Neo-Babylonian sources. According to the god list An = Anum ^{d}IGI.DU could also be used as a logographic writing of the names of Ninurta (tablet VI. line 192; however, a variant lists the sumerogram ^{d}GÉSTU instead of ^{d}IGI.DU) and the Elamite deity Igišta (tablet VI, line 182; also attested in Elamite theophoric names). It could also be used to represent the names of Lugal-irra and Meslamta-ea. Beaulieu points out that in the Neo-Babylonian period two different deities whose names were rendered as ^{d}IGI.DU were worshiped in Udannu, and proposed a relation with Lugal-irra and Meslamta-ea. The single attestation of ^{d}IGI.DU as a representation of the name of Alammuš is an astronomical text is presumed to be the result of confusion between him and Ningublaga, the "Little Twins", with Lugal-Irra and Meslamtaea, the "Great Twins".

=== Other names and epithets ===
Nergal also had a large number of other names and epithets, according to Frans Wiggermann comparable only to a handful of other very popular deities (especially Inanna), with around 50 known from the Old Babylonian period, and about twice as many from the later god list An = Anum, including many compounds with the word lugal, "lord". For instance, he could be referred to as "Lugal-silimma", lord of peace. A few of Nergal's titles point at occasional association with vegetation and agriculture, namely Lugal-asal, "lord (of the) poplar"; Lugal-gišimmar, "Lord (of the) date palm" (also a title of Ninurta); Lugal-šinig, "Lord (of the) tamarisk"; Lugal-zulumma, "Lord (of the) dates". However, Dina Katz stresses that these names were only applied to Nergal in late sources, and it cannot be assumed that this necessarily reflected an aspect of his character already extant earlier on. A frequently attested earlier epithet is Guanungia, "bull whose great strength cannot be repulsed", already in use the Early Dynastic period. An alternate name of Nergal listed in the Babylonian recension of the god list Anšar = Anum, ^{d}e-eb-ri, reflects the Hurrian word ewri, "lord".

== Character ==
Nergal's role as a god of the underworld is the already attested in an Early Dynastic Zame Hymns, specifically in the hymn dedicated to Kutha, where he is additionally associated with the so-called "Enki-Ninki deities", a group regarded as ancestors of Enlil believed to reside in the underworld. According to a hymn from the reign of Ishme-Dagan, dominion over the land of the dead was bestowed upon Nergal by his parents, Enlil and Ninlil. He was believed to decide fates of the dead the same way as Enlil did for the living. In one Old Babylonian adab song Nergal is described as "Enlil of the homeland (kalam) and the underworld (kur)". He was also occasionally referred to as Enlil-banda, "junior Enlil", though this title also functioned as an epithet of the god Enki.

In addition to being a god of the underworld, Nergal was also a war god, believed to accompany rulers on campaigns, but also to guarantee peace due to his fearsome nature serving as a deterrent. In that capacity he was known as Lugal-silimma, "lord of peace". He was also associated with disease. As summed up by Frans Wiggermann, his various domains make him the god of "inflicted death". He also played an important role in apotropaic rituals, in which he was commonly invoked to protect houses from evil. Fragments of tablets containing the Epic of Erra, a text detailing his exploits, were used as amulets.

=== Astral role ===
Nergal was associated with Mars. Like him, this planet was linked with disease (especially kidney disease) in Mesopotamian beliefs. However, Mars was also associated with other deities: Ninazu (under the name "the Elam star"), Nintinugga, and especially Simut, in origin an Elamite god. The name of the last of these figures in Mesopotamian sources could outright refer to the planet (^{mul}Si-mu-ut, "the star Simut").

A number of scholars in the early 20th century, for example Emil Kraeling, assumed that Nergal was in part a solar deity, and as such was sometimes identified with Shamash. Kraeling argued that Nergal was representative of a certain phase of the sun, specifically the sun of noontime and of the summer solstice that brings destruction, high summer being the dead season in the Mesopotamian annual cycle. This view is no longer present in modern scholarship. While some authors, for example Nikita Artemov, refer to Nergal as a deity of "quasi-solar" character, primary sources show a connection between him and sunset rather than noon. For instance, an Old Babylonian adab song contains a description of Nergal serving as a judge at sunset, while another composition calls him the "king of sunset". This association is also present in rituals meant to compel ghosts to return to the underworld through the gates to sunset.

=== Iconography ===
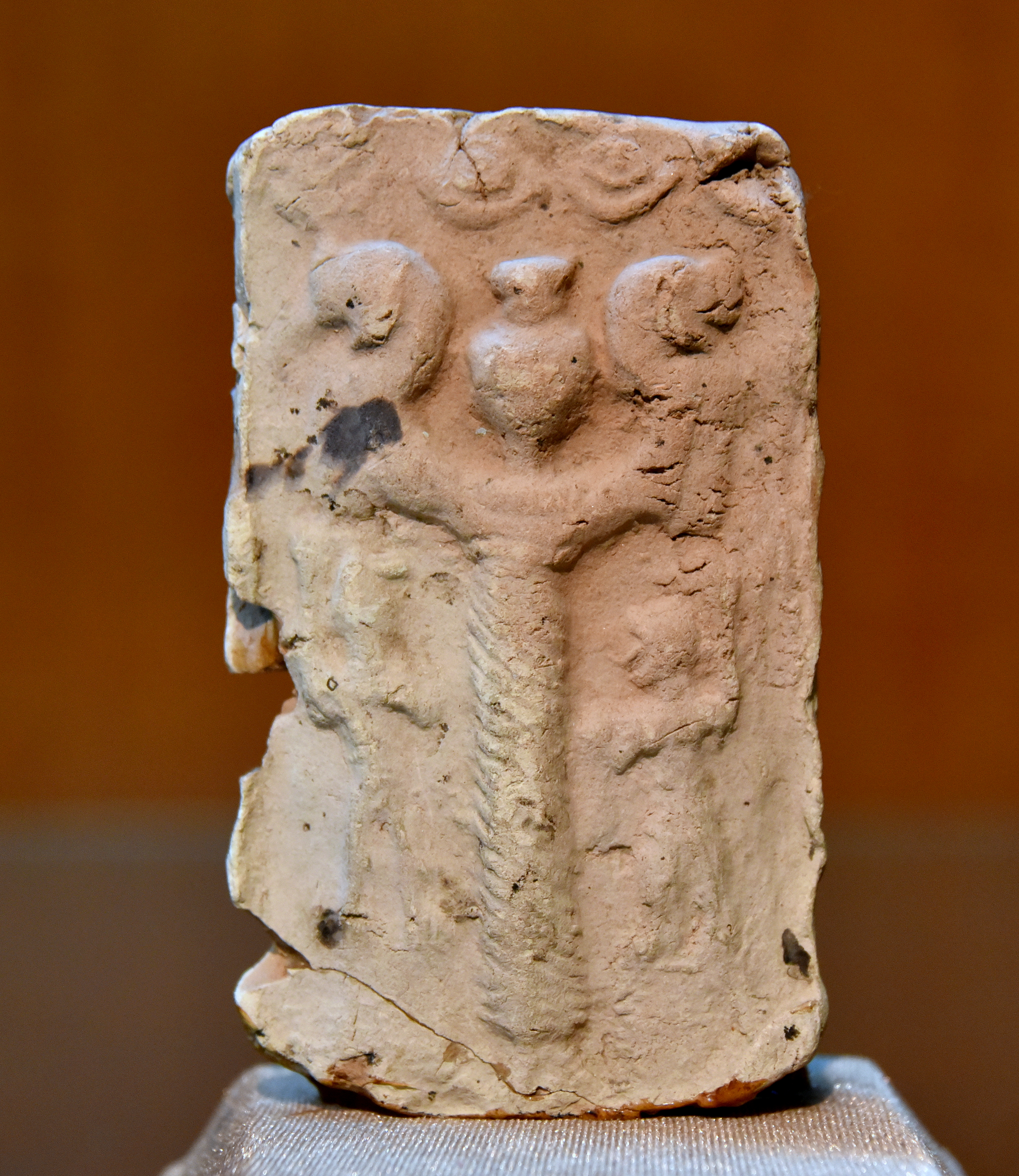
A symbol of Nergal on Old-Babylonian fired clay plaque from Nippur, Southern Mesopotamian, Iraq

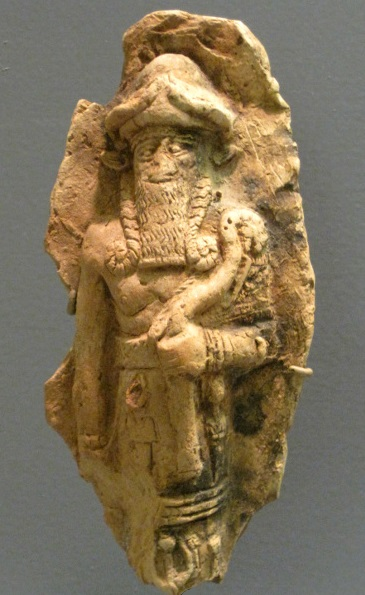
A bull-eared deity, possibly a courtier of Nergal

Nergal's role as a war god was exemplified by some of his attributes: mace, dagger and bow. A mace with three lion-shaped heads and a scimitar adorned with leonine decorations often appear as Nergal's weapons on cylinder seals. He was also often depicted in a type of flat cap commonly, but not exclusively, worn by underworld deities in Mesopotamian glyptic art.

Bulls and lions were associated with Nergal. On the basis of this connection it has been proposed that minor deities with bull-like ears on Old Babylonian terracotta plaques and cylinder seals might have been depictions of unspecified members of Nergal's entourage. An entry in the explanatory god list An = Anu ša amēli seemingly associates Nergal with chameleons, as his title Bar-MUŠEN-na, explained as "Nergal of rage" (ša uzzi) is like a scribal mistake for bar-gun_{3}-(gun_{3})-na ("the one with a colorful exterior"), presumed to be the Akkadian term for chameleon; Ryan D. Winters suggests that the animal's color changing might have been associated with mood swings or choleric temperament, and additionally that it was perceived as a "chthonic" being.

War standards could serve as a symbolic representation of Nergal too, and the Assyrians armies in particular were often accompanied by such devotional objects during campaigns. A similar symbol also represented Nergal on kudurru, inscribed boundary stones.

== Associations with other deities ==
The god most closely associated with Nergal was Erra, whose name was Akkadian rather than Sumerian and can be understood as "scorching". Two gods with names similar to Erra who were also associated with Nergal were Errakal and Erragal. It is assumed that they had a distinct origin from Erra.

Ninazu was seemingly already associated with Nergal in the Early Dynastic period, as a document from Shuruppak refers to him as "Nergal of Enegi", his main cult center. The city itself was sometimes called "Kutha of Sumer". In later times, especially in Eshnunna, he started to be viewed as a son of Enlil and Ninlil and a warrior god, similar to Nergal.

Many minor gods were associated or equated with Nergal. The god Shulmanu, known exclusively from Assyria, was associated with Nergal and even equated with him in god lists. Lagamar (Akkadian: "no mercy"), son of Urash (the male tutelary god of Dilbat) known both from lower Mesopotamian sources and from Mari and Susa is glossed as "Nergal" in the god list An = Anum. Lagamar, Shubula and a number of other deities are also equated with Nergal in the Weidner god list. Luhusha (Sumerian: "angry man"), worshiped in Kish, was referred to as "Nergal of Kish". Emu, a god from Suhum located on the Euphrates near Mari, was also regarded as Nergal-like. He is directly identified as "Nergal of Sūḫi" in the god list Anšar = Anum, and might be either the same deity as the poorly attested Âmûm (a-mu, a-mu-um or a-mi-im) known from Mari, or alternatively a local derivative of the sea god Yam, possibly introduced to this area by people migrating from further west; Ryan D. Winters notes in the latter case the association would presumably reflect Nergal's epithet lugala'abba, "king of the sea".

Nergal was on occasion associated with Ishtaran, and in this capacity he could be portrayed as a divine judge. However, as noted by Jeremiah Peterson, this association is unusual as Nergal was believed to act as a judge in locations where the sun sets in mythological texts, while on the account of Der's location Ishtaran was usually associated with the east, where the sun rises.

=== Parents and siblings ===
Enlil and Ninlil are attested as Nergal's parents in the overwhelming majority of sources, and while in the myth Nergal and Ereshkigal he addresses Ea as "father", this might merely be a honorific, as no other evidence for such an association exists.

In the myth Enlil and Ninlil Nergal's brothers are Ninazu (usually instead a brother of Ninmada), Nanna and Enbilulu. In a single text, a Neo-Babylonian letter from Marad, his brothers are instead Nabu and Lugal-Marada, the tutelary god of this city. However, this reference is most likely an example of captatio benevolentiae, a rhetorical device meant to secure the goodwill of the reader, rather than a statement about genealogy of deities.

=== Wives and children ===
Multiple goddesses are attested as Nergal's wife in various time periods and locations, but most of them are poorly defined in known documents. While Frans Wiggermann assumes that all of them were understood as goddesses connected to the earth, this assumption is not shared by other assyriologists.

Laṣ, first attested in an offering list from the Ur III period mentioning various deities from Kutha, was the goddess most commonly regarded as Nergal's spouse, especially from the Kassite and middle Assyrian periods onward. She received offerings from neo-Babylonian kings alongside Nergal in Kutha. Her name is assumed to have its origin in a Semitic language, but both its meaning and Laṣ' character are unknown. Based on the Weidner god list, Wilfred G. Lambert proposes that she was a medicine goddess. Couples consisting of a warrior god and a medicine goddess (such as Pabilsag and Ninisina or Zababa and Bau) were common in Mesopotamian mythology.

Another goddess often viewed as the wife of Nergal was Mammitum. Her name is homophonous with Mami, a goddess of birth known for example from the Nippur god list, leading some researchers to conflate them. However, it is generally accepted that they were separate deities, and they are kept apart in Mesopotamian god lists. Multiple meanings have been proposed for her name, including "oath" and "frost" (based on a similar Akkadian word, mammû, meaning "ice" or "frost"). It is possible she was introduced in Kutha alongside Erra. In at least one text, a description of a New Year ritual from Babylon during which the gods of Kish, Kutha and Borsippa were believed to visit Marduk (at the time not yet a major god), both she and Laṣ appear side by side as two separate goddesses. In the Nippur god list Laṣ occurs separately from Nergal, while Mammitum is present right behind him, which along with receiving offerings alongside him in Ekur in the same city in the Old Babylonian lead researches to conclude a spousal relation existed between them. She is also the wife of Erra/Nergal in the Epic of Erra. The Middle Babylonian god list An = Anum mentions both Laṣ and Mamitum, equating them with each other, and additionally calls the goddess Admu ("earth") Nergal's wife. She is otherwise only known from personal names and a single offering list from Old Babylonian Mari.

In third millennium BCE in Girsu, the spouse of Nergal (Meslamtaea) was Inanna's sukkal Ninshubur, otherwise seemingly viewed as unmarried. Attestations of Ninshubur as Nergal's sukkal are also known, though they are infrequent.

According to the myth Nergal and Ereshkigal he was married to Ereshkigal, the goddess of the dead. In god lists, however, they do not appear as husband and wife, though there is evidence that their entourages started to be combined as early as in the Ur III period. Ereshkigal's importance in Mesopotamia was largely limited to literary, rather than cultic, texts.

Nergal's daughter was Tadmushtum, a minor underworld goddess first attested in Drehem in the Ur III period. In an offering list she appears alongside Laṣ. Her name has Akkadian origin, possibly being derived from the words dāmasu ("to humble") or dāmašu (connected to the word "hidden"), though more distant cognates were also proposed, including Geʽez damasu ("to abolish", "to destroy", or alternatively "to hide"). It has also been proposed that a linguistic connection existed between her and the Ugaritic goddess Tadmish (or Dadmish, ddmš in the alphabetic script), who in some of the Ugaritic texts occurs alongside Resheph, though a copy of the Weidner god list from Ugarit however equates Tadmish with Shuzianna rather than Tadmushtum. In Neo-Babylonian lists of so-called "Divine Daughters", pairs of minor goddesses associated with specific temples likely viewed as daughters of their head gods, the "Daughters of E-Meslam" from Kutha are Dadamushda (Tadmushtum) and Belet-Ili.

While Frans Wiggermann and Piotr Michalowski additionally regard the god Shubula as Nergal's son, it is actually difficult to determine if such a relation existed between these two deities due to the poor preservation of the tablet of the god list An = Anum where Shubula's position in the pantheon was specified. Shubula might have been a son of Ishum rather than Nergal. He was an underworld god and is mostly known from personal names from the Ur III and Isin-Larsa periods. His name is most likely derived from the Akkadian word abālu ("dry"). There is also clear evidence that he was regarded as Tadmushtum's husband.

=== Servants ===
Nergal's sukkal (attendant deity) was initially the god Ugur, possibly the personification of his sword. After the Old Babylonian period he was replaced in this role by Ishum. Sporadically Inanna's sukkal Ninshubur or Ereshkigal's sukkal Namtar were said to fulfill this role in the court of Nergal instead. His other courtiers included umum, so-called "day demons", who possibly represented points in time regarded as inauspicious; various minor deities associated with diseases; the minor warrior gods known as Sebitti; and a number of figures at times associated with Ereshkigal and gods such as Ninazu and Ningishzida as well, for example Namtar's wife Hushbisha, their daughter Hedimmeku, and the deified heroes Gilgamesh and Etana (understood as judges of the dead in this context). In some texts the connection between Gilgamesh in his underworld role and Nergal seems to be particularly close, with the hero being referred to as "Nergal's little brother".

=== Foreign deities ===
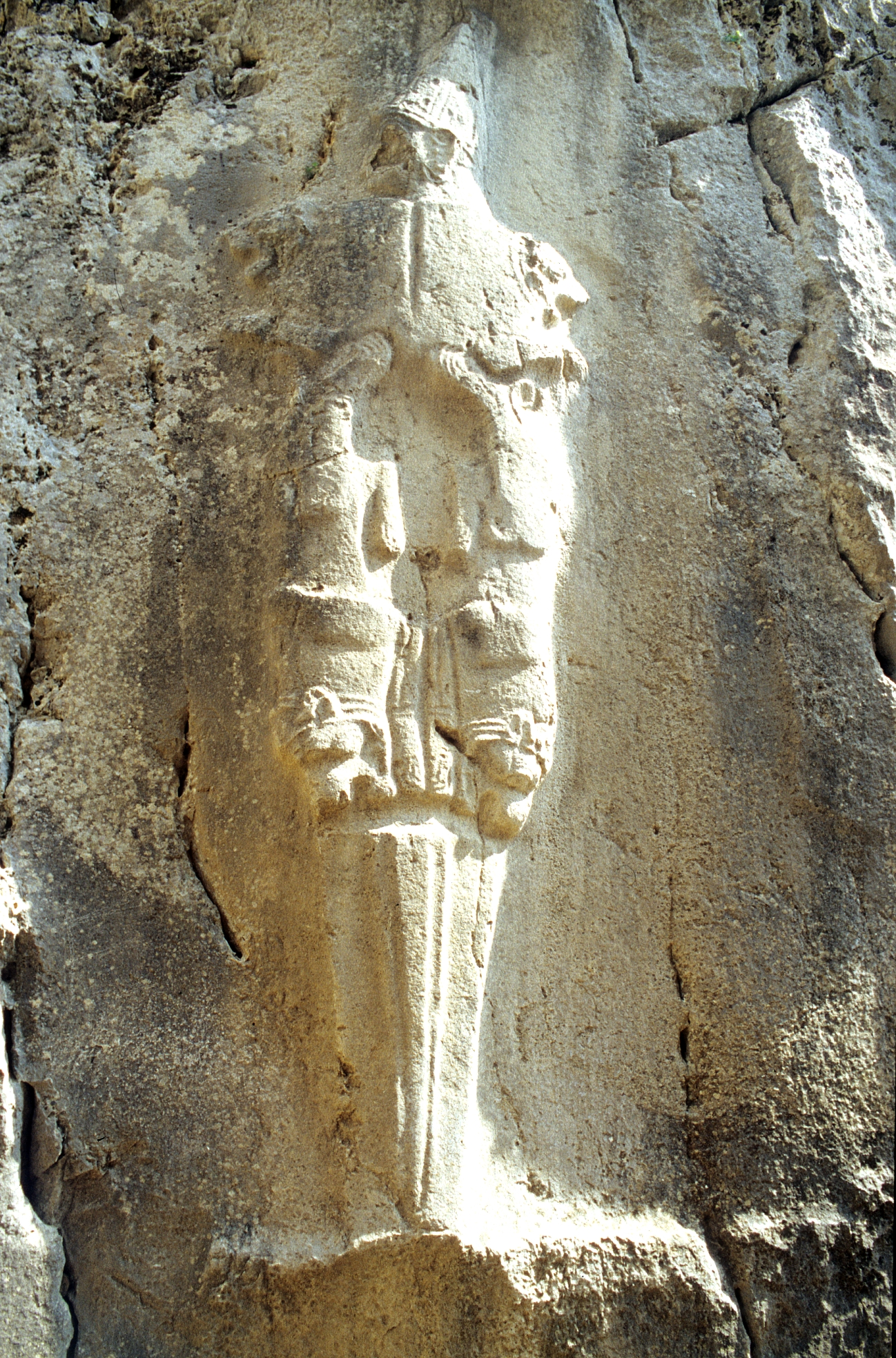
The "sword-god" from Yazılıkaya, identified with Nergal

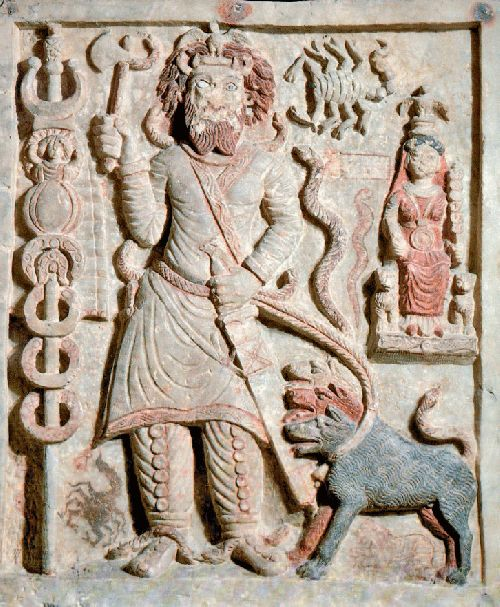
Syncretic Parthian relief carving of Nergal-Heracles from Hatra in Iraq, dating to the first or second century AD

Resheph, a western god of war and plague, was already associated with Nergal in Ebla in the third millennium BCE, though the connection was not exclusive, as he also occurs in contexts which seem to indicate a relation with Ea (known in Ebla as Hayya) instead. Furthermore, the Eblaite scribes never used Nergal's name as a logographic representation of Resheph's. According to Alfonso Archi, it is difficult to further speculate about the nature of Resheph and his relation to other deities in Eblaite religion due to lack of information about his individual characteristics. The equivalence between Nergal and the same western gods is also known from Ugarit, where Resheph was additionally associated with the planet Mars, much like Nergal in Mesopotamia. Documents from Emar on the Euphrates mention a god called "Nergal of the KI.LAM" (seemingly a term designating a market), commonly identified with Resheph by researchers. Additionally, "Lugal-Rasap" functioned as a title of Nergal in Mesopotamia according to god lists.

It has been proposed that in Urkesh, a Hurrian city in northern Syria, Nergal's name was used to represent a local deity of Hurrian origin logographically. Two possible explanations have been proposed: Aštabi and Kumarbi. The former was a god of Eblaite origin, later associated with Ninurta rather than Nergal, while the latter was the Hurrian "father of the gods", usually associated with Enlil and Dagan. Gernot Wilhelm concludes in a recent publication that the identification of Nergal in the early Urkesh inscriptions as Kumarbi is not implausible, but at the same remains impossible to conclusively prove. He points out that it is also not impossible that Kumarbi only developed as a distinct deity at a later point in time. Alfonso Archi notes that it also possible the god meant is Nergal himself, as he is attested in other Hurrian sources as an actively worshiped deity.

In the Yazılıkaya sanctuary, Nergal's name was apparently applied to a so-called "sword god" depicted on one of the reliefs, most likely a presently unidentified local god of death.

The Elamite god Simut was frequently associated with Nergal, shared his association with the planet Mars and possibly his warlike character, though unlike his Mesopotamian counterpart he was not an underworld deity. In one case he appears alongside Laṣ. Wouter Henkelman additionally proposes that "Nergal of Hubshal (or Hubshan)" known from Assyrian sources was Simut. However, other identities of the deity identified by this moniker have been proposed as well, with Volkert Haas instead identifying him as Ugur. Yet another possibility is that Emu was the deity meant.

Based on lexical lists, two Kassite gods were identified with Nergal, Shugab and Dur.

In a Middle Assyrian god list, "Kammush" appears among the epithets of Nergal. According to Wilfred G. Lambert it cannot be established whether this indicates an equation with either the third millennium BCE god Kamish known from the Ebla texts, or the Iron Age god Chemosh from Moab.

In late, Hellenistic sources from Palmyra, Hatra and Tarsus Heracles served as the interpretatio graeca of Nergal. Heracles and Nergal were also both (at different points in time) associated with the Anatolian god Sandas, as well as the Tyrian god Melqart, whose name also translates to "king of the city."

== Worship ==
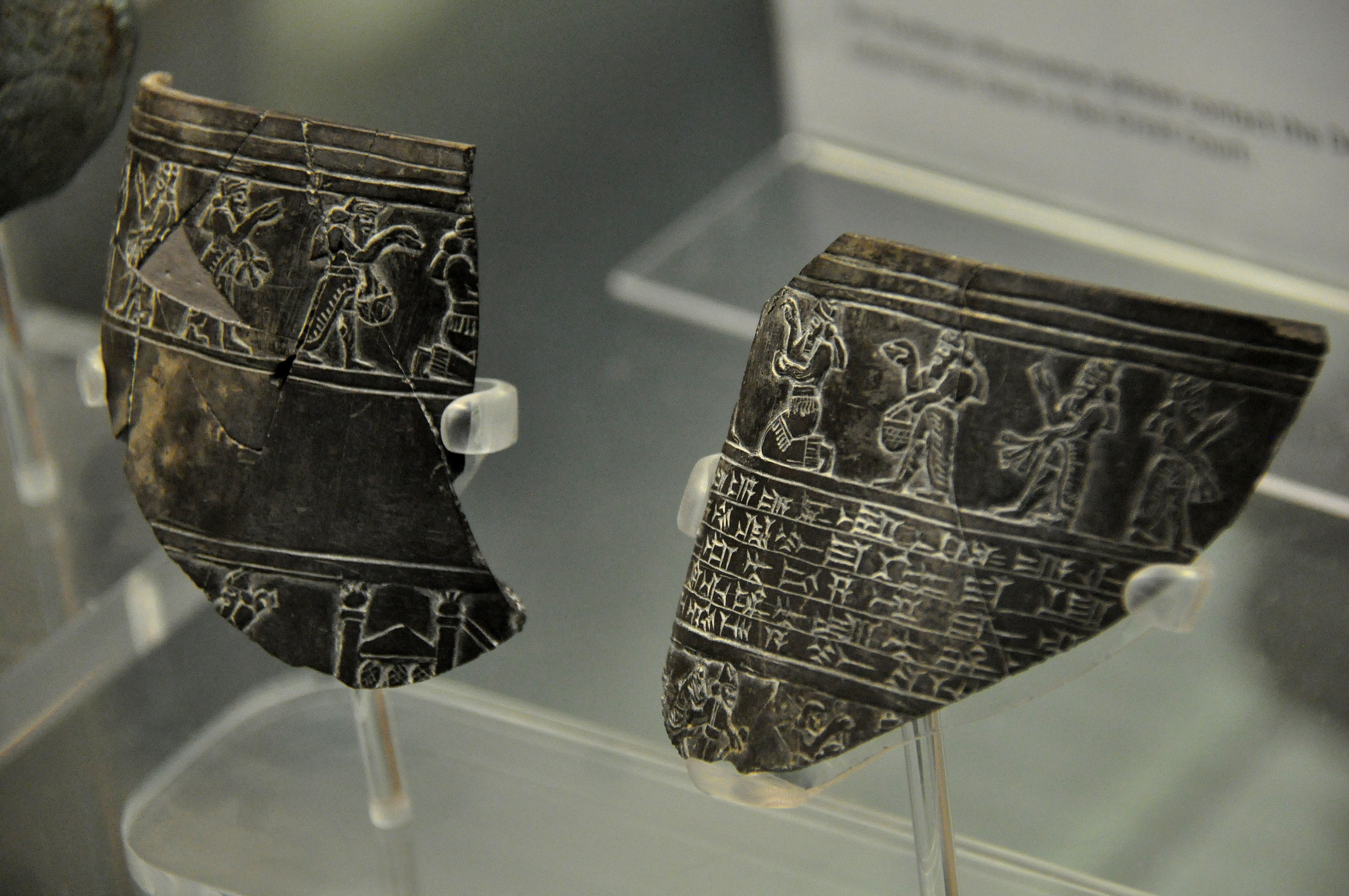
Fragments of a vessel dedicated to the temple of Nergal in Nineveh, showing Shalmaneser III kneeling before Nergal, currently held in the British Museum in London

Nergal's main cult center was Kutha, where his temple E-Meslam was located. Andrew R. George proposes the translation "house, warrior of the netherworld" for its name. A secondary name of the E-Meslam was E-ḫuškia, "fearsome house of the underworld". It is already attested in documents from the reign of Shulgi, on whose orders repair work was undertaken there. Later monarchs who also rebuilt it include Apil-Sin, Hammurabi, Ashurbanipal and Nebuchadnezzar II. It continued to function as late as in the Seleucid period. In addition to Kutha, Apak (Apiak) is well attested as a major cult center of Nergal, already attested in documents from the Sargonic period. Its precise location is not known, but it has been established that it was to the west of Marad. In this city, he could be referred to as Lugal-Apiak. While absent from Assyria in the Akkadian period, later he rose to the status of one of the most major gods there. Tarbiṣu was a particularly important Assyrian cult center of both Nergal and his wife Laṣ. His temple in this city, originally built by Sennacherib, also bore the name E-Meslam. A third temple named E-Meslam was located in Mashkan-shapir according to documents from the reign of Hammurabi, and it is possible it was dedicated to Nergal too. The veneration of Nergal in this city is well documented.

Naram-Sin of Akkad was particularly devoted to Nergal, describing him as his "caretaker" (rābisu) and himself as a "comrade" (rū'um) of the god. At the same time, worship of Nergal in the southernmost cities of Mesopotamia was uncommon in the third millennium BCE, one exception being the presence of "Meslamtaea" in Lagash in Gudea's times. This changed during the reign of Shulgi, the second king from the Third Dynasty of Ur. Theological texts from this period indicate that Nergal was viewed as one of the major gods and as king of the underworld. Tonia Sharlach proposes that "Nergal of TIN.TIR^{ki}" known from this period should be understood as the original tutelary god of Babylon. This interpretation is not supported by Andrew R. George, who notes that Nergal of TIN.TIR^{ki} is usually mentioned alongside Geshtinanna of KI.AN^{ki}, Ninhursag of KA.AM.RI^{ki}, and other deities worshiped in settlements located in the proximity of Umma, and on this basis he argues that this place name should be read phonetically as Tintir and refers to a small town administered directly from said city, and not to Babylon, whose name could be written logographically as TIN.TIR^{ki} in later periods. Other authors agree that the worship of Nergal is well attested in the area around Umma. George additionally points out that there is no indication that Babylon was regarded as a major cult center of Nergal in any time period.

In the Old Babylonian period Nergal continued to be worshiped as a god of the dead, as indicated for example by an elegy in which he appears alongside Ningishzida, Etana and Bidu, the gatekeeper of the underworld. He appears for the first time in documents from Uruk in this period. Anam of Uruk built a temple dedicated to him in nearby Uzurpara during the reign of Sîn-gāmil. It is possible that it bore the name E-dimgalanna, "house, great bond of heaven". Multiple temples of other deities (Sud, Aya and Nanna) bearing the same name are attested from other locations as well. Damiq-ilishu of Isin also built a temple of Nergal in this location, the E-kitušbidu, "house whose abode is pleasant". In Uruk itself, Nergal had a small sanctuary, possibly known as E-meteirra, "house worthy of the mighty one". A temple bearing this name was rebuilt by Kudur-Mabuk at one point. Nergal continued to be worshiped in Uruk as late as in early Achaemenid times, and he is mentioned in a source from the 29th year of the reign of Darius I. One late document mentions an oath taken in the presence of a priest (sanga) of Nergal during the sale of a prebend in which Nergal and Ereshkigal were invoked as divine witnesses.

Ancient lists of temples indicate that a temple of Nergal bearing the name E-šahulla, "house of the happy heart", was located in Mê-Turan. It was identified during excavations based on brick inscriptions and votive offerings dedicated to Nergal. It shared its name with a temple of Nanaya located in Kazallu. According to Andrew R. George, its name was most likely a reference to the occasional association between Nergal and joy. For example, a street named "the thoroughfare of Nergal of Joy" (Akkadian: mūtaq Nergal ša ḫadê) existed in Babylon, while the god list An = Anum ša amēli mentions "Nergal of jubilation" (^{d}U.GUR ša rišati).

In Lagaba, Nergal was worshiped under the name Išar-kidiššu. He could also be referred to as the tutelary god of Marad, though this city was chiefly associated with Lugal-Marada. Offerings or other forms of worship are also attested from Dilbat, Isin, Larsa, Nippur and Ur. It is possible that a temple of Nergal bearing the name E-erimḫašḫaš, "house which smites the wicked", which was at one point rebuilt by Rim-Sîn I, was located in the last of these cities. Temples dedicated to him also existed in both Isin and Nippur, but their names are not known.

In the Neo-Babylonian period Nergal was regarded as the third most important god in the Babylonian state pantheon after Marduk and Nabu. These three gods often appear together in royal inscriptions. Based on a cylinder of Neriglissar providing for E-Meslam in Kutha was regarded as a royal duty, similar as in the case of Marduk's and Nabu's main temples (respectively E-Sagil in Babylon and E-Zida in Borsippa). However, administrative documents indicate that Nergal and his wife Laṣ received fewer offerings than Marduk or Nabu. In some families it was seemingly customary to give the third son a theophoric name invoking Nergal, in accordance with his position in the state pantheon.

14th and 28th days of the month were regarded as sacred to Nergal, as was the number 14 itself, though it was also associated with Sakkan.

Unlike other Mesopotamian deities associated with the underworld (for example Ereshkigal), Nergal is well attested in theophoric names.

=== Hurrian reception ===
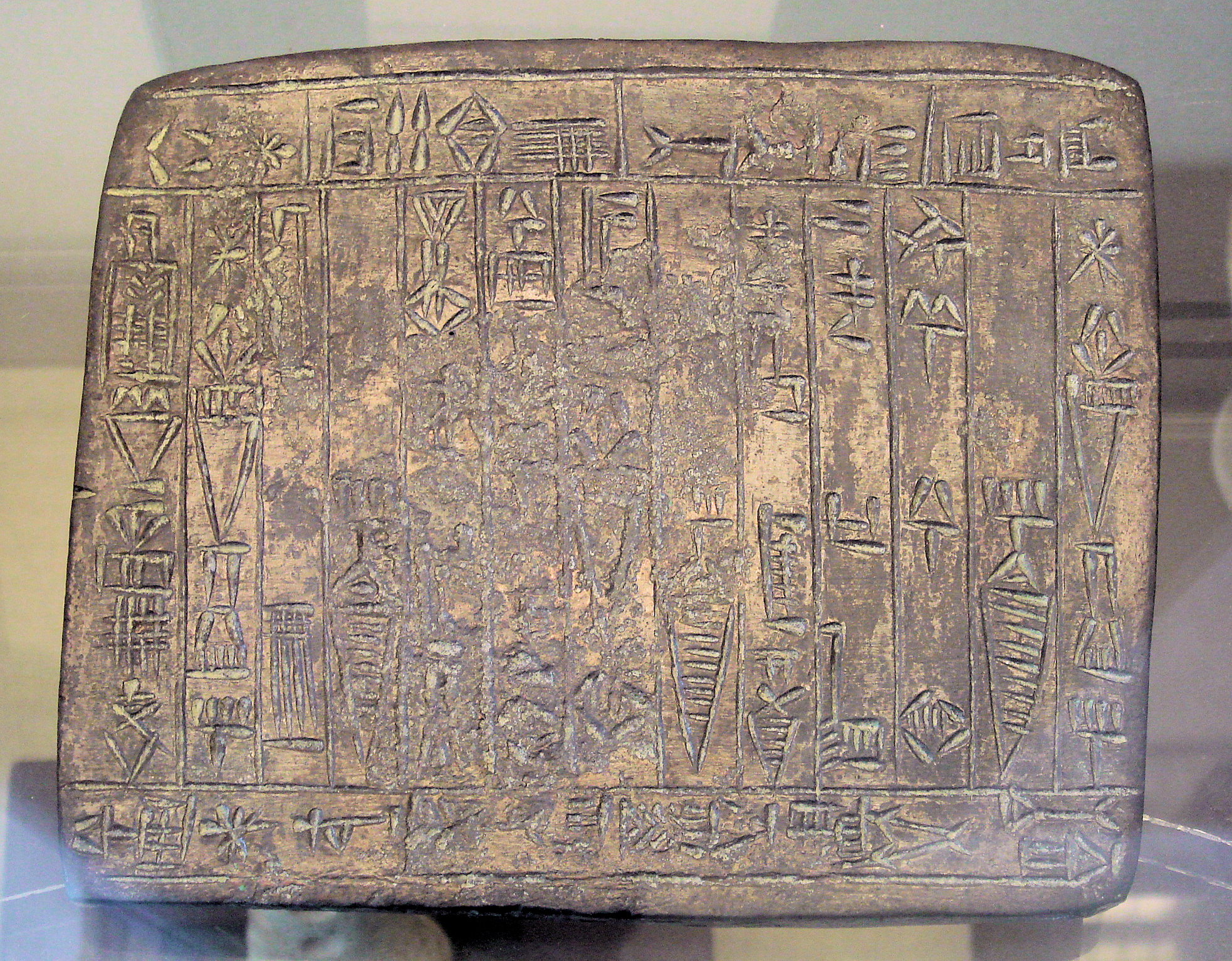
Foundation tablet of Atal-shen, king of Urkesh and Nawar, Habur Bassin, circa 2000 BCE. Louvre Museum AO 5678.

Nergal was also incorporated into the pantheon of the Hurrians, and it has been argued he was among the earliest foreign gods they adopted. He is one of the gods considered to be "pan-Hurrian" by modern researchers, a category also encompassing the likes of Teshub, Shaushka or Nupatik. He is already attested in the inscriptions of two early Hurrian kings of Urkesh, Tish-atal and Atal-shen. An inscription of the former is the oldest known text in Hurrian:

Tish-atal, endan of Urkesh, has built a temple of Nergal. May the god Lubadaga protect this temple. Who destroys it, [him] may Lubadaga destroy. May the weather god not hear his prayer. May the mistress of Nagar, the sun-god, and the weather-god [...] him who destroys it.

The sun god and the weather god in this inscription are most likely Hurrian Shimige and Teshub.

Atal-shen referred to Nergal as the lord of a location known as Hawalum:

Of Nergal the lord of Hawalum, Atal-shen, the caring shepherd, the king of Urkesh and Nawar, the son of Sadar-mat the king, is the builder of the temple of Nergal, the one who overcomes opposition. Let Shamash and Ishtar destroy the seeds of whoever removes this tablet. Shaum-shen is the craftsman.

Giorgio Buccellati in his translation quoted above renders the names of the other deities invoked as Shamash and Ishtar, but according to Alfonso Archi the logograms ^{d}UTU and ^{d}INANNA should be read as Shimige and Shaushka in this case.

The worship of Nergal is also well attested in the eastern Hurrian settlements. These include Arrapḫa, referred to as the "City of the Gods", which was located near modern Kirkuk, as well as Ḫilamani, Tilla and Ulamme, where an entu priestess dedicated to him resided. In the last three of these cities, he was associated with a goddess referred to as "^{d}IŠTAR Ḫumella", the reading and meaning of whose name are unclear.

== Mythology ==
=== Nergal and Ereshkigal ===
Two versions of the myth Nergal and Ereshkigal are known, one from a single Middle Babylonian copy found in Amarna, seemingly copied by a scribe whose native language was not Akkadian and another known from Sultantepe and from Uruk, with copies dated to the Neo-Assyrian and Neo-Babylonian periods, respectively. The time of original composition is uncertain, with proposed dates varying from Old Babylonian to Middle Babylonian times. Whether a Sumerian original existed is unknown, and the surviving copies are all written in Akkadian.

After Nergal fails to pay respect to Ereshkigal's sukkal Namtar during a feast where he acts as a proxy of his mistress, who cannot leave the underworld to attend, she demands to have him sent to the underworld to answer for it. The El Amarna version states that she planned to kill Nergal, but this detail is absent from the other two copies.

Nergal descends to the underworld, but he's able to avoid many of its dangers thanks to advice given to him by Ea. However, he ignores one of them, and has sex with Ereshkigal. After six days he decides to leave while Ereshkigal is asleep. After noticing this she dispatches Namtar, and demands the other gods to convince Nergal to return again, threatening to open the gates of the underworld if she does not get what she asks for. Nergal is handed over to her again.

In the Amarna version, where Ereshkigal initially planned to kill Nergal, he defeats Namtar and prepares to kill Ereshkigal. To save herself, she suggests that they can get married and share the underworld. The other two known copies give the myth a happy ending: as noted by assyriologist Alhena Gadotti, "the two deities seem to reunite and live happily ever after", and the myth concludes with the line "they impetuously entered the bedchamber".

According to assyriologists such as Stephanie Dalley the purpose of this narrative was most likely to find a way to reconcile two different views of the underworld, one from the north centered on Nergal, and another from the south centered on Ereshkigal. Tikva Frymer-Kensky's attempt at interpreting it as evidence of "marginalization of goddesses" is regarded as erroneous. According to Alhena Gadotti the idea that Ereshkigal was supposed to share kingship over the underworld with her spouse is also known from the Old Babylonian composition Gilgamesh, Enkidu and the Underworld, in which Anu and Enlil give the underworld to her "as a dowry, her portion of the paternal estate's inheritance, which she controlled until she married". It is however impossible to tell which of the three gods regarded as Ereshkigal's husbands in various sources was implicitly meant to be the recipient of the dowry in this composition—Gugalanna, Nergal, or Ninazu.

=== Epic of Erra ===
The oldest surviving copies of the Epic of Erra come from the Assyrian city of Nineveh and have been dated to the seventh century BCE, but it has been argued that the composition is between 100 and 400 years older than that based on possible allusions to historical events which occurred during a period of calamity which Babylonia experienced roughly between eleventh and eighth centuries BCE. A colophon indicates that it was compiled by a certain Kabti-ilani-Marduk, which constitutes an uncommon of example of a direct statement of authorship of an ancient Mesopotamian text.

Nergal (the names Nergal and Erra are both used to refer to the protagonist of the narrative) desires to wage war to counter a state of inertia he found himself in. His weapons (the Sebitti) urge him to take action, while his sukkal Ishum, who according to Andrew R. George appears to play the role of Nergal's conscience in this myth, attempts to stop him. Nergal dismisses the latter, noting that it is necessary to regain respect in the eyes of humans, and embarks on a campaign.

His first goal is Babylon. Through trickery he manages to convince Marduk (portrayed as a ruler past his prime, rather than as a dynamic hero, in contrast with other compositions) to leave his temple. However, Marduk returns too soon for Nergal to successfully start his campaign, and as a result in a long speech he promises to give other gods a reason to remember him. As a result of his declaration (or perhaps because of Marduk's temporary absence), the world seemingly finds itself in a state of cosmic chaos.

Ishum once again attempts to convince Nergal to stop, but his pleading does not accomplish its goal. Nergal's acts keep escalating and soon Marduk is forced to leave his dwelling again, fully leaving the world at Nergal's mercy. A number of graphic descriptions of the horrors of war focused on nameless humans suffering because of Nergal's reign of terror follow. This is still not enough, and he declares his next goal is to destroy the remaining voices of moderation, and the cosmic order as a whole.

However, Ishum eventually manages to bring an end to the bloodshed. He does so by waging a war himself, targeting the inhabitants of Mount Sharshar, seemingly a site associated with the origin of the aforementioned period of chaos in the history of late second and early first millennium BCE Babylonia. Ishum's war is described in very different terms to Nergal's, and with its end the period of instability comes to a close. Nergal is seemingly content with the actions of his sukkal and with hearing the other gods acknowledge the power of his rage. The narrative ends with Nergal instructing Ishum to spread the tale of his rampage, but also to make it clear that only thanks to his calming presence the world was spared.

=== Other myths ===
A poorly preserved Middle Assyrian composition, regarded as similar to the Labbu myth, seemingly describes a battle between Nergal (possibly acting on behalf of his father Enlil or the sky god Anu) and a monstrous serpent born in the sea.

The myth Enmesharra's Defeat, only known from a single, heavily damaged copy from the Seleucid or Parthian period, casts Nergal as the warden of the eponymous antagonist and his seven sons, the Sebitti, presumably imprisoned in the underworld. In the surviving fragments Enmesharra unsuccessfully pleads with him to be released to avoid being put to death for his crimes at the orders of Marduk. In the aftermath of the ordeal, the universe is reorganized and Marduk shares lordship over it, which seemingly originally belonged to Anu in this composition, with Nergal and Nabu. Wilfred G. Lambert notes these gods were the 3 most prominent deities in the neo-Babylonian state pantheon. Curiously, Erra makes a brief appearance as a god distinct from Nergal, with his former sphere of influence reassigned to the latter.

Andrew R. George proposes that a myth presently unknown from textual records dealt with Nergal's combat with a one-eyed monster, the igitelû. He notes that Akkadian omen texts from Susa and from the Sealand archives appears to indicate that one-eyed creatures were known as igidalu, igidaru or igitelû, possibly a loanword from Sumerian igi.dili ("one eye"), and that the only god associated with them was Nergal, who in one such omen texts is identified as the slayer of an igitelû. There is also evidence that birth of one-eyed animals was regarded as an omen connected to Nergal. He proposes that a relief originally excavated in Khafajah (ancient Tubub) depicting a god stabbing a one-eyed monster with rays of light emanating from his head might be a pictorial representation of this hypothetical myth, though other interpretations have been proposed too, including Marduk killing Tiamat and Ninurta killing Asag. However, neither of these found widespread support, and art historian Anthony Green in particular showed skepticism regarding them, noting art might preserve myths not known from textual record. Wilfred G. Lambert suggested that the cyclops in mention might instead be a depiction of Enmesharra, based on his description as a luminous deity in Enmesharra's Defeat.

== Later relevance ==
Nergal is mentioned in the Book of Kings as the deity of the city of Cuth (Kutha): "And the men of Babylon made Succoth-benoth, and the men of Cuth made Nergal" (2 Kings, 17:30). According to the rabbinic tradition, he was associated with the image of a foot or a rooster.

Scholars identify the god referred to by the late antique Christian writer Jacob of Serugh as the "lord with his dogs," whom he describes as one of the deities worshipped in the strongly pagan city of Harran, as a localized form of Nergal. This epithet likely dates to the Parthian period, during which Nergal became iconographically associated with dogs due to Iranian notions of the dog as an underworld guardian.

In Mandaean cosmology, the name for Mars is Nirig (ࡍࡉࡓࡉࡂ), a derivative of Nergal, which is a part of a recurrent pattern of Mandaean names of celestial bodies being derived from names of Mesopotamian deities.

Victorian lexicographer E. Cobham Brewer asserted that the name of Nergal, whom he identified as "the most common idol of ancient Phoenicians, Indians and Persians", meant "dunghill cock". This translation is incorrect in the light of modern research, as Nergal's name most likely was understood as "Lord of the big city", his emblematic animals were bulls and lions, while chickens were unknown in Mesopotamia prior to the ninth century BCE based on archeological data, and left behind no trace in cuneiform sources.
