= Ghosts in Mesopotamian religions =

There are many references to ghosts in ancient Mesopotamian religion – the religions of Sumer, Babylon, Assyria and other early states in Mesopotamia. Traces of these beliefs survive in the later Abrahamic religions that came to dominate the region.

The concept of ghosts or spirits in Mesopotamia is comparable to the shades of the deceased in the Underworld in the mythology of classical antiquity. The shades or spirits of the deceased were known as gidim (gidim 𒄇) in Sumerian, which was borrowed as eṭemmu in Akkadian. The Sumerian word is analyzed as a compound of either gig "to be sick" and dim^{3} "a demon", or gi_{6} "black" + dim_{4} "to approach".

Gidim were thought to be created at time of death, taking on the memory and personality of the dead person. They traveled to the netherworld, Irkalla, where they were assigned a position, and led an existence similar in some ways to that of the living. Relatives of the dead were expected to make offerings of food and drink to the dead to ease their conditions. If they did not, the ghosts could inflict misfortune and illness on the living. Traditional healing practices ascribed a variety of illnesses to the action of ghosts, while others were caused by gods or demons. Some sources say the spirit was "inherited from the slain god whose body was used in creating man".

== Netherworld ==
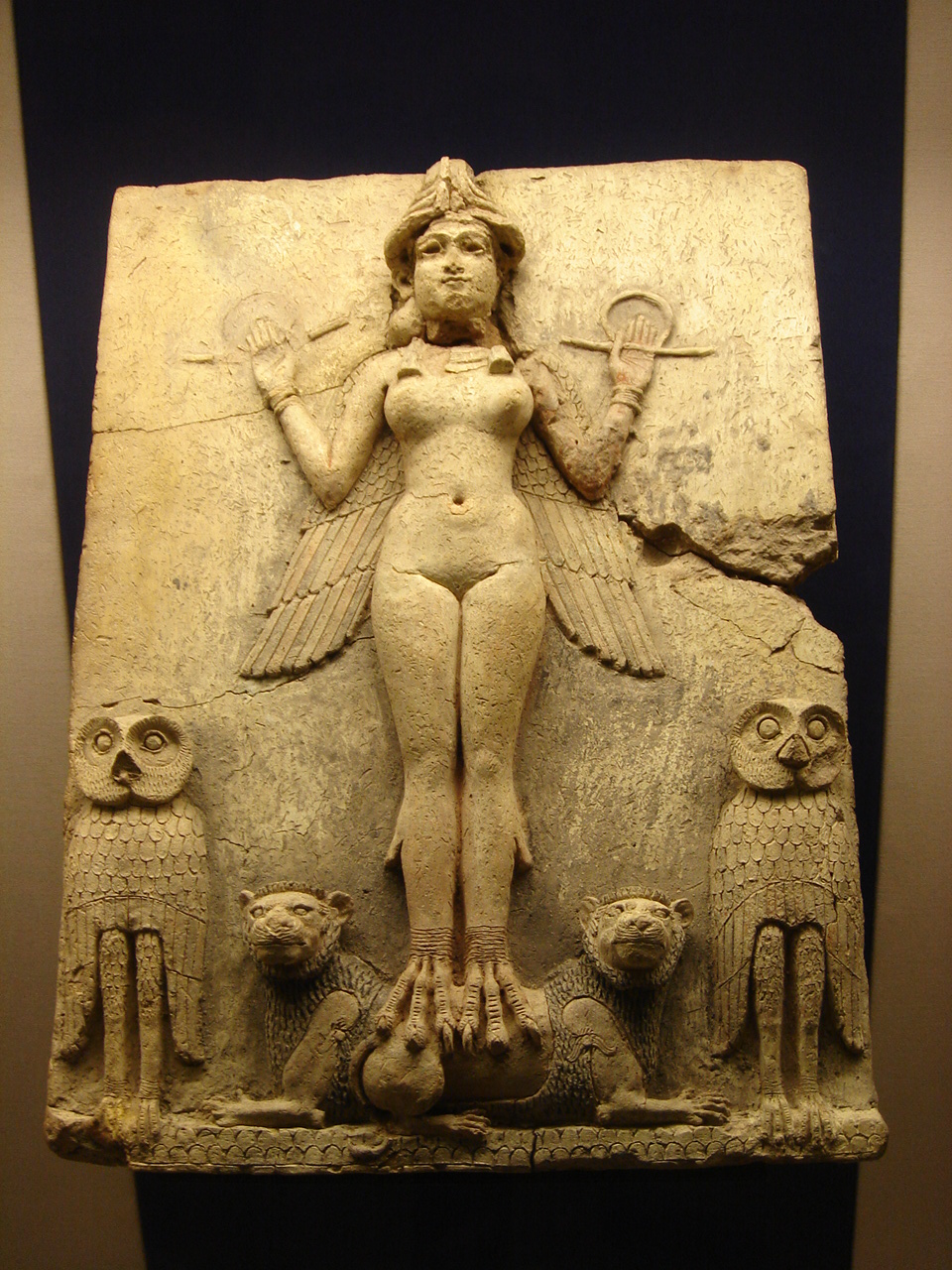
The Burney Relief (c. 1792 - 1750 BC), representing an ancient Babylonian goddess, possibly Inanna or Ereshkigal

In Mesopotamian religion, Irkalla, the Underworld, is ruled by the goddess Ereshkigal and her consort Nergal or Ninazu. Ghosts spent some time traveling to the netherworld, often having to overcome obstacles along the way. The Anunnaki, the court of the netherworld, welcomed each ghost and received their offerings. The court explained the rules and assigned the ghost his fate or place.

Another court was presided over by the sun god Utu, who visited the netherworlds on his daily round, Shamash might punish ghosts who harassed the living, and might award a share of funerary offerings to forgotten ghosts.

The Babylonian netherworld was populated by an array of monsters and demons. However, within the netherworld the ghosts existed in a manner similar to the living. They had houses and could meet with deceased family members and associates.

The Epic of Gilgamesh revolves around a relationship between the hero-king Gilgamesh and his close companion, Enkidu. It may loosely refer to a real king of the 27th century BCE. Part of the story relates Enkidu's death, the adventures of his ghost in the underworld, and the eventual return to the world when Gilgamesh breaks a hole in the earth.

== Interaction with the living ==
The Babylonians believed that life in the underworld could be made more tolerable if the surviving relatives regularly made offerings of food and drink. The ghosts of people without children to make these offerings would suffer more, while people who died in fire or whose body lies in the desert would have no ghost at all. If the relatives failed to make offerings, the ghost could become restless and visit sickness and misfortune on them.

Physical ailments resulting from hearing or seeing a ghost included headaches, eye and ear problems, various intestinal pains, shortness of breath and dizziness, fever and neurological and mental disorders. Cures involved ritual performances with use of offerings, libations, figurines, ritual burial and dispatch, encirclement, amulets, fumigants, bandages, salves, potions, washes, and suppositories. Other Mesopotamian diseases were blamed on gods or ghosts, each causing a particular sickness.

== See also ==
- Ancient Mesopotamian religion
- Religions of the ancient Near East
- Shade (mythology)
- Sumerian religion
