= Nirig =

Planet Mars in Mandaeism

- Member of the Seven Planets
- Other names: Marik
- Abode: World of Darkness
- Planet: Mars
- Parents: Ruha and Ur

Equivalents
- Akkadian: Nergal

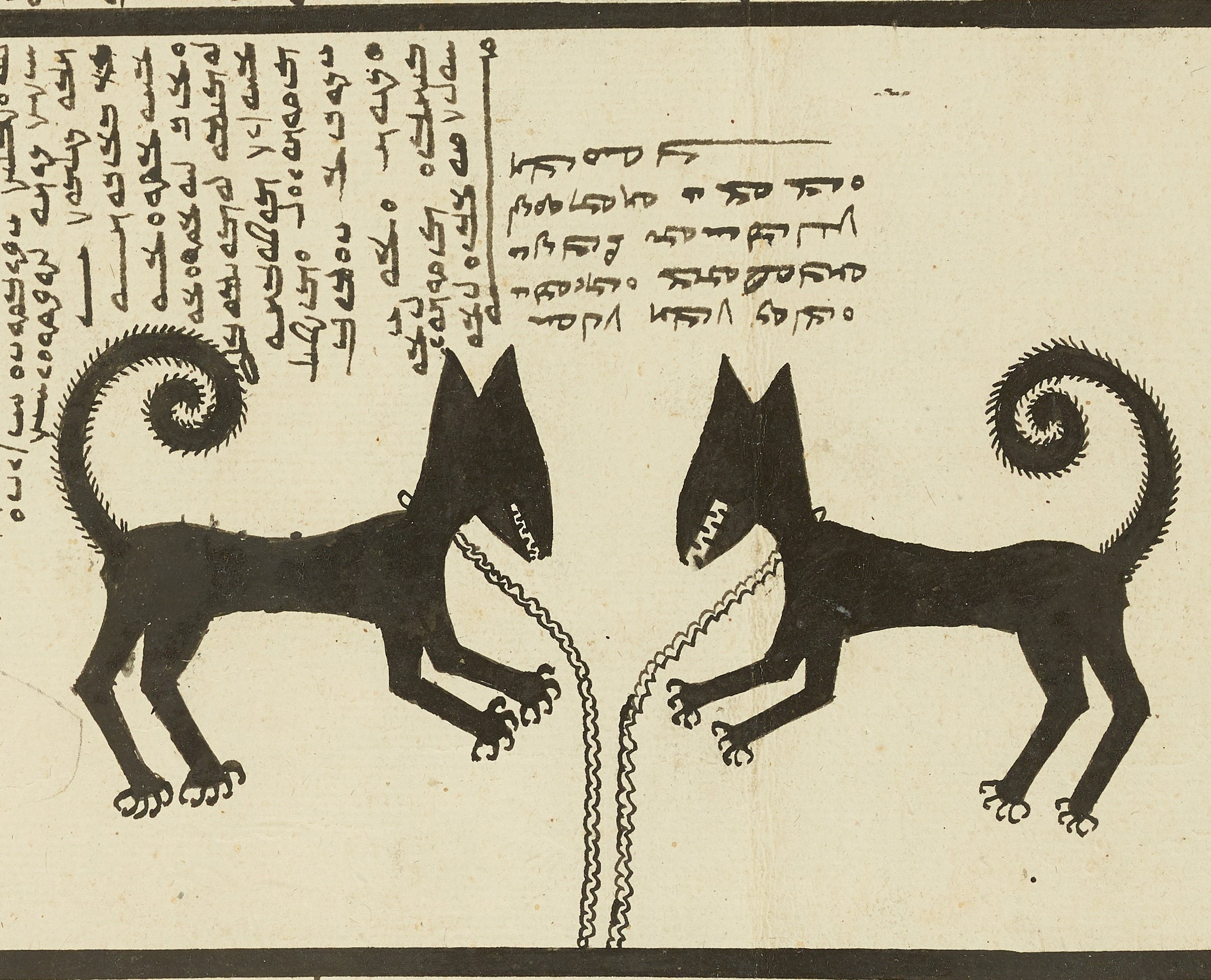
Drawing of two dogs in the maṭarta of Nirig. From the Scroll of Abatur (MS DC 8).

In Mandaeism, Nirig (Classical Mandaic: ࡍࡉࡓࡉࡂ) or Nerig is the Mandaic name for the planet Mars. Nirig is one of the seven planets (Classical Mandaic: ࡔࡅࡁࡀ, romanized: šuba, lit. 'The Seven'), who are part of the entourage of Ruha in the World of Darkness.

Nirig, who is also called Marik, is associated with Islam, as well as with war and violence. Nirig's name is derived from the Akkadian Nergallu.
