= Bitu (god) =

Mesopotamian god, gatekeeper of the underworld

- doorkeeper of the underworld
- Abode: underworld

Bitu or Bidu (formerly read Neti or Nedu) was a minor Mesopotamian god who served as the doorkeeper of the underworld. His name is Akkadian in origin, but he is present in Sumerian sources as well.

== Name ==
The spellings Bitu and Bidu are both used in modern scholarship. The name of the gatekeeper of the underworld was written in Sumerian as ^{d}NE.TI. In older sources, it was read as Neti. The reading Bidu has been established by Antoine Cavigneaux and Farouk al-Rawi in 1982 based on the parallel with the syllabic spelling Bitu (bi-tu). Multiple other syllabic spellings are attested, including bí-ti, bí-du_{8}, bí-duḫ and bi-ṭu-ḫi. Michael P. Streck suggests that the forms with du_{8} should be understood as a learned spelling based on the meaning of this cuneiform sign, "to loosen," and on the Sumerian word for a gatekeeper, ì-du_{8}. The name is however derived from the imperative form of Akkadian petû, "open." Based on this etymology Dina Katz argues that the concept of a gate of the underworld, and the descriptions of this location in which it resembles a fortified city, were Akkadian in origin.

In the so-called First Elegy of the Pushkin Museum Bitu's name is written without a dingir sign denoting divinity, though he is classified as a deity in Death of Gilgamesh and elsewhere. The omission might therefore be a simple scribal mistake.

According to Khaled Nashef, it is possible that a connection existed between the name of Bitu and that of Ipte-Bitam, the sukkal (attendant deity) of the agricultural god Urash.

== Character ==
Bitu's primary function is that of a gatekeeper (ì-du_{8}). He could also be addressed as the "great gatekeeper," ì-du_{8} gal. This epithet was transcribed in Akkadian as idugallu. In incantations which were meant to compel demons and ghosts to return to the underworld, a formula placing them under the control of Bitu was sometimes used.

His position in enumerations of underworld deities varies between sources. The First Elegy of the Pushkin Museum pairs him with the legendary king Etana, also believed to be a functionary of the underworld. In an incantation from the middle of the second millennium BCE, he appears between Namtar and Gilgamesh. An Assyrian funerary inscriptions mentions him alongside Ningishzida.

In a single text, the position of the doorman of the underworld is instead assigned to Namtar.

== Mythology ==
In Inanna's Descent, Bitu announces the arrival of the eponymous goddess in the land of the dead to his mistress, Ereshkigal. He is also tasked with telling Inanna to remove various articles of clothing while she enters through the seven gates of the underworld. In the text Death of Ur-Namma, Bitu is absent, but seven anonymous doorkeepers are mentioned among the underworld deities, possibly as a reflection of the motif of seven gates mentioned in Inanna's Descent.

In the later of the two known versions of the myth Nergal and Ereshkigal, Bitu is the first of the seven gatekeepers of the underworld listed.

The late text Underworld Vision of an Assyrian Prince describes Bitu as a hybrid creature with the head of a lion, feet of a bird and hands of a human.
