= Ereshkigal =

Ancient Mesopotamian goddess of death and the underworld

- Queen of the Underworld
- The "Queen of Night Relief", which dates to the Old Babylonian Period and might represent either Ereshkigal or Ishtar
- Abode: Kur or Irkalla

Genealogy
- Parents: Nanna and Ningal (implicitly, following the most common genealogy of Inanna)
- Siblings: Inanna, Shamash
- Consort: Ninazu, Gugalana, later Nergal
- Children: Nungal, Ninazu, Namtar (in only one text)

Equivalents
- Greek: Hecate (only in a late magical papyrus)
- Hurrian: Allani
- Hittite: Sun goddess of the Earth
- Hattian: Lelwani

In Mesopotamian mythology, Ereshkigal (Sumerian: 𒀭𒊩𒌆𒆠𒃲 [^{D}EREŠ.KI.GAL], lit. 'Queen of the Great Earth' (Note: An alternate reading is "Lady of the Great Place", understood to mean a euphemism to refer to the land of the dead.)) was the goddess of Kur, the land of the dead or underworld in Sumerian mythology. In later myths, she was said to rule Irkalla alongside her husband Nergal. Sometimes her name is given as Irkalla, similar to the way the name Hades was used in Greek mythology for both the underworld and its ruler, and sometimes it is given as Ninkigal, lit. "Lady of the Great Earth”.

Ereshkigal was only one of multiple deities regarded as rulers of the underworld in Mesopotamia. The main temple dedicated to her was located in Kutha, a city originally associated with Nergal, and her cult had a very limited scope. No personal names with "Ereshkigal" as a theophoric element are known.

In the ancient Sumerian poem Inanna's Descent into the Underworld, Ereshkigal is described as Inanna's older sister. However, this is a cultural artifact since the Sumerians used terms such as sister as a way to place each other on the same level in hierarchy.

The two main myths involving Ereshkigal are the story of Inanna's descent into the Underworld and the story of Ereshkigal's marriage to the god Nergal. Other myths also associate her with gods such as Ninazu, originally regarded as her husband but later as a son, and Ningishzida.

== Mythology ==
In Sumerian mythology, Ereshkigal was the queen of the underworld. Some researchers believe that Ninazu originally fulfilled this function, with Ereshkigal only becoming a significant ruler of the land of the dead in Sumerian imagination at a later point in time. However, beliefs related to this sphere were somewhat amorphous, and it is possible there was initially no single universally-agreed-upon version of relevant mythical and cultic concepts, with various deities, both male and female, ruling over the underworld in the belief systems of various areas and time periods.

In later Babylonian god lists, Ereshkigal held a senior status among the underworld deities, ruling over the category of so-called "transtigridian snake gods" (such as Ninazu, Tishpak, Ishtaran, and the Elamite god Inshushinak, in Mesopotamia known almost exclusively in the afterlife context), while Nergal, who fulfilled analogous functions in the north in Sumerian times, had an entourage of minor war gods and disease demons instead. The idea of Nergal and Ereshkigal as a couple likely developed out of a need to reconcile the two traditions.

Ereshkigal's sukkal (vizier or messenger) was Namtar.

While obscure in cultic texts, Ereshkigal was prominent in mythical literature. Examples of myths where she plays an important role include:

=== Inanna's Descent into the underworld ===
In this poem, the goddess Inanna descends into the underworld, apparently seeking to extend her powers there. Ereshkigal is described as being Inanna's older sister. When Neti, the gatekeeper of the underworld, informs Ereshkigal that Inanna is at the gates and demanding to be let in, Ereshkigal responds by ordering Neti to bolt the seven gates of the underworld and to open each separately, but only after Inanna has removed one article of clothing.

Inanna proceeds through each gate, removing one article of clothing at each gate, and also loses her magic items to a nymph over the course of the journey. Finally, once she has gone through all seven gates, she finds herself naked and powerless, standing before the throne of Ereshkigal. The seven judges of the underworld judge Inanna and declare her to be guilty. Inanna is struck dead and her corpse is hung on a hook in the underworld for everyone to see.

Inanna's minister, Ninshubur, however, pleads with various gods and finally Enki agrees to rescue Inanna from the underworld. Enki sends two sexless beings down to the underworld to revive Inanna with the food and water of life. These beings escort Inanna up from the underworld, but a horde of angry demons follow Inanna, demanding to take someone else down to the underworld as Inanna's replacement. They initially want it to be Ninshubur, but Inanna rebukes this order, stating that she would not hand over a loyal subordinate to them. However, when she discovers that her husband, Dumuzid, has not mourned her death, she becomes ireful towards him and orders the demons to take him as her replacement.

Diane Wolkstein argued that Inanna and Ereshkigal represent polar opposites: Inanna is the queen of heaven, but Ereshkigal is the queen of Irkalla.

=== Marriage to Nergal ===
This myth tells the story of the origin of Ereshkigal's marriage to Nergal. Two versions are known, though they differ only in details related to the motivation of the deities involved and both the plot structure and ultimate outcome are the same.

Once, the gods held a banquet that Ereshkigal, as queen of the underworld, could not come up to attend. Kaka, one of the messengers of Anu (analogous to Papsukkal or Ninshubur) invited her to send a messenger, and she sent her vizier Namtar in her place. He was treated well by most, the exception being Nergal, who treated Namtar with disrespect. As a result of this, Ereshkigal demanded Nergal to be sent to the underworld to atone. In one version, she planned to kill Nergal upon arrival in the underworld, but this detail is absent from the other versions. (Note: "Upon hearing about this, Ereškigal demands, and ultimately obtains, that the renegade god be sent to her so that she may kill him (Amarna version)")

Nergal travels under the advice of Ea, who warns him not to sit, eat, drink or wash while in the underworld, as well as not to have sex with Ereshkigal. At his advice Nergal travels to the underworld along with 14 demons. When he arrives, the gatekeeper Neti gets orders from Ereshkigal to allow him through the seven gates, stripping him of everything before arriving in the throne room, but at each gate, Nergal posts two demons.

Although Nergal has no problem with respecting all the other warnings, the god succumbs to the temptation and lies with the goddess for six days. At the seventh, he escapes back to the upper world, which makes Ereshkigal upset. Namtar is then sent to bring Nergal back, but Ea disguises Nergal as a lesser god and Namtar is fooled. Ereshkigal ultimately realizes the deception and demands Nergal to return again, threatening to open the gates of the underworld and allow the spirits of the dead to swarm the world of the living if her demands are ignored. The gods agree to hand Nergal over to her again.

In the same version in which Ereshkigal planned to kill Nergal, when he gets to the throne he knocks over Namtar and drags Ereshkigal to the floor. He is about to kill her with his ax when she pleads for her life; she promises to be his wife and to share her power with him. He consents. However, Nergal must still leave the underworld for six months, so Ereshkigal gives him back his demons and allows him to traverse the upper world for that time, after which he returns to her.

In the other version, known from two copies, the myth has a less violent ending: according to Assyriologist Alhena Gadotti, "the two deities seem to reunite and live happily ever after," and the myth concludes with the line "they impetuously entered the bedchamber."

In both versions, Nergal ends up becoming a king of the underworld, ruling alongside Ereshkigal.

=== Ningishzida's journey to the nether world ===
Ereshkigal is mentioned near the end of this composition. The vegetation god Ningishzida presumably has to descend to her kingdom each year.

=== The underworld vision of an Assyrian prince ===
Ereshkigal is listed alongside other underworld deities. Nergal is described as her husband in this text.

== Family ==
In some versions of the myths, Ereshkigal rules the Underworld by herself, but in other versions of the myths, she rules alongside a husband subordinate to her named Gugalana. Gugalana had no fixed identity. In Inanna's descent he dies before the events of the myth; in some inscriptions he is the father of Ninazu; eventually this name became a title of Nergal as well.

In Sumerian mythology, Ereshkigal is the mother of the goddess Nungal. In a fragmentary text translated by Jeremiah Peterson, Nungal appears alongside Ereshkigal and the healing goddess Nintinugga.

In one late magical text her son with Enlil was her vizier Namtar.

== Syncretism ==
The Hurrian underworld goddess Allani was conflated with Ereshkigal in Mesopotamia, and with the Sun goddess of the Earth among the Hittites and Luwians. While Allani was originally introduced in Mesopotamia as an independent figure, receiving offerings in Ur during Shulgi's reign under the name Allatum (alongside other foreign deities such as Ishara and Belet Nagar), she gradually became little more than a title of Ereshkigal.

The Hattian death god Lelwani, originally described as a male deity with the masculine title of katte (king), started to be viewed as a goddess instead due to conflation with Allani and Ereshkigal.

=== Ereshkigal's name in Greek magical texts ===
In later times, the Greeks appear to have applied the name Ereshkigal (Ερεσχιγαλ) to their own goddess Hecate. In the heading of a spell in the Michigan Magical Papyrus, which has been dated to the late third or early fourth century A.D. (and as such was written after the art of reading cuneiform texts was lost), Hecate is referred to as "Hecate Ereschkigal" and is invoked using magical words and gestures to alleviate the caster's fear of punishment in the afterlife. Hecate's worship was not directly borrowed from Mesopotamia but shows parallels in rites and wording of chants, indicating influence and syncretism.

== Obsolete theories ==
In his 1944 book, Sumerian Mythology: A Study of Spiritual and Literary Achievement in the Third Millennium B.C. Samuel Noah Kramer proposed that, according to the introductory passage of the ancient Sumerian epic poem, "Gilgamesh, Enkidu, and the Netherworld," Ereshkigal was forcibly abducted, taken down to the Underworld by the Kur, and was forced to become queen of the Underworld against her will. In order to avenge the abduction of Ereshkigal, Enki, the god of water, set out in a boat to slay the Kur. The Kur defends itself by pelting Enki with rocks of many sizes and by sending the waves beneath Enki's boat to attack Enki. The poem never actually explains who the ultimate victor of the battle is, but it is implied that Enki wins. Samuel Noah Kramer relates this myth to the ancient Greek myth of the abduction of Persephone, asserting that the Greek story is probably derived from the ancient Sumerian story.

This view, and even the idea of Kur being a single well-defined monster rather than a vague term referring to mountains, foreign lands or the underworld, are not supported by modern scholars. The passage mentioned is interpreted as Enlil and Anu assigning a dowry to Ereshkigal. (Note: Gadotti notes that "there is nothing ambiguous about the meaning of saĝ-rig_{7}, nor are its Akkadian translations particularly open to interpretation")

== Genealogy of Sumerian deities ==
An
Ninḫursaĝ	Enki born to Namma	Ninkikurga born to Namma	Nisaba born to Uraš	Ḫaya
Ninsar	Ninlil	Enlil
Ninkurra	Ningal maybe daughter of Enlil	Nanna	Nergal maybe son of Enki	Ninurta maybe born to Ninḫursaĝ	Baba born to Uraš
Uttu	Inanna possibly also the daughter of Enki, of Enlil, or of An	Dumuzid maybe son of Enki	Utu	Ninkigal married Nergal
Meškiaĝĝašer	Lugalbanda	Ninsumun
Enmerkar	Gilgāmeš
Urnungal

== See also ==
- Allani
- Ghosts in Mesopotamian religions
- Lelwani
- Sun goddess of the Earth
- Descent of Inanna into the Underworld
