= Hušbišag =

Sumerian netherworld goddess

Hušbišag or Hushbishag (𒀭𒄭𒄊𒁉𒊷) is a Sumerian netherworld goddess. She is the wife of Namtar and mother of Hemdikug, a daughter.

In the Standard Akkadian version of the Epic of Gilgamesh, in the VIII tablet of the epic the titular hero offers her a golden necklace after the death of his companion Enkidu so that she may welcome him in the Netherworld and walk by his side: “To Hushbishag, handmaid of the dark gods, a golden necklace;... Let the gods accept these, let them welcome my friend and walk at his side in the underworld, so that Enkidu may not be sick at heart.”
