= Namtar =

Mesopotamian mythical being

- Attendant of Ereshkigal
- Abode: Ancient Mesopotamian underworld

Genealogy
- Parents: Mardula'anki (mother)
- Spouse: Hušbišag
- Children: Ḫedimmeku

Namtar (Sumerian: 𒉆𒋻, lit. 'fate') was a figure in ancient Mesopotamian religion who, depending on the context, could be regarded both as a minor god and as a demon of disease. He is best attested as the sukkal (attendant deity) of Ereshkigal, the goddess of the underworld. Like her, he was not the object of active worship, though references to it are made in literary texts, and additionally some incantations entrust him with keeping various other malevolent forces in the underworld.

== Character and functions ==
Namtar's name means "fate" in Sumerian. It can be differentiated from the ordinary word "fate" in Sumerian texts due to being preceded by the dingir sign, so-called divine determinative, used to identify the names of deities. The same name was used in Akkadian, written as ^{d}nam-ta-ru. Jacob Klein notes that true to his name, Namtar was most likely understood as the personification of unavoidable fate, implicitly understood as death. Aicha Rahmouni compares the role of Namtar in Mesopotamian beliefs to that played by Mot, the personified death, in Ugaritic texts.

The primary roles of Namtar in the Mesopotamian pantheon were those of a minor god of the underworld and of a disease demon, especially strongly associated with headaches and heart pain. While his two roles were interconnected, according to Jacob Klein the precise development of his character is presently impossible to discern. Barbara Böck proposes that he was initially only a disease demon, and developed into Ereshkigal's sukkal at some point in the second millennium BCE.

His appearance was typically described as fearsome, with references to such traits as "twisted hands" or "mouth filled with venom." The Underworld Vision of an Assyrian Prince states that he could be depicted slaying a man with a sword.

No attestations of Namtar as a deity are known from before the Old Babylonian period. While the word namtar, without the divine determinative, does appear in personal names from the earlier Ur III period, they are unlikely to refer to him, as according to Dina Katz, theophoric names invoking him are not known from later periods, similar as in the case of his mistress Ereshkigal.

Namtar is generally absent from offering lists, indicating he had no active cult. Making offerings to him is nonetheless mentioned in a few literary texts, including Death of Gilgamesh and Death of Ur-Namma, in both cases being undertaken by the eponymous protagonist.

Incantations indicate that the medicine goddess Ninisina was invoked to counter Namtar's influence. The same function was also attributed to Asalluhi. However, Namtar could in turn be implored to take care of other demons, for example an incantation against Mimma Lemnu, the personified "Any Evil," entrusts him with keeping this being imprisoned in the underworld. An incantation addressed to the fire god Girra asks him to hand over the enemies of the petitioner to Namtar.

== Associations with other deities ==
Namtar served as the sukkal of Ereshkigal, though less commonly he could also be referred to as the sukkal of Nergal. Some texts simply refer to him as "sukkal of the underworld," sukkal ereseti^{ki}.

According to the god list An = Anum, Namtar had a wife, Hušbišag, known also from various myths and incantations. She was called the "stewardess of the underworld." Their daughter was Ḫedimmeku, though she is also mentioned as a daughter of Enki in a different section of the same god list. Namtar's mother is identified as Mardula'anki, already attested in this role in earlier lists. A single source applies the name Ḫumussiru ("mouse") to her. though it was more commonly applied to the god Amurru and it is unclear how it came to be associated with Namtar's mother. Only a single Udug-hul incantation instead refers to Namtar as a son of Enlil and Ereshkigal. A single late text, Underworld Vision of an Assyrian Prince, might also mention a feminine counterpart of Namtar, Namtartu, though the restoration of the name is uncertain.

As a disease demon, Namtar was often paired with Asag in incantations, with the two of them regarded as the most dangerous sources of diseases.

On occasion, the god Šulpae could be compared to Namtar, or even addressed with his name.

A single Old Babylonian letter associates Lugal-namtarra, a deity possibly analogous to Namtar, with Ninshubur, and invokes both of them to bless the recipient. Lugal-namtarra, as well as a deity whose name was written as ^{d}SUKKAL, who according to Odette Boivin might be analogous to Ninshubur, both appear in association with Shamash in texts from the archives of the First Sealand dynasty in place of his usual attendants (such as Bunene).

== Mythology ==
Namtar appears in the role of Ereshkigal's sukkal in the myth Nergal and Ereshkigal. As the queen of the land of the dead cannot travel to heaven, he partakes in a banquet taking place there as her representative. While most of the gathered gods pay respect to him, Nergal refuses to, which is the reason behind Ereshkigal's demand to have him sent down to the underworld. Later Namtar is sent to heaven once again to bring Nergal back after he escapes from the underworld while Ereshkigal is asleep.

Another myth casting him in the same role is Ishtar's Descent, where Ereshkigal tasks him with inflicting her sister Ishtar with sixty diseases, and later with reviving her and leading her back to the world of the living to find a substitute. This element of the story is absent from the earlier Sumerian myth Inanna's Descent, in which Namtar is not mentioned and Inanna dies as a result of a verdict of divine judges.

In Atrahasis, Enlil initially plans to rely on Namtar to deal with noise created by mankind.

In the myth Enki and Ninmah Namtar is mentioned in passing as one of the gods invited to the banquet celebrating the creation of mankind.
