= Sarra-El =

King of Yamhad (died c. 1575 BC)

King of Yamhad
- Reign: c. 1600 - c. 1575 BC
- Predecessor: Hammurabi III
- Successor: Abba-El II
- Died: c. 1575 BC
- Issue: Abba-El II

Sarra-El also written Šarran (died c. 1575 BC) was a king of Yamhad who might have regained the throne after the assassination of the Hittite king Mursili I.

== Identity and Relation to the Royal Family ==
Sarra-El is known through the Seal of his son Abba-El II used by Niqmepa king of Alalakh as a dynastic seal. The seal describes Abba-El II as the beloved of Hadad, the title used by the kings of Yamhad, Niqmepa was the son of Idrimi who was a descendant of the old Kings of Yamhad, Idrimi's father Ilim-Ilimma I was probably the son of Abba-El II.

These facts confirms that Sarra-El was a prince of Yamhad, Sarra-El name is also mentioned in two Alalakh Tablets (AlT 79 and AlT 95), in the later tablet his name came after the name of princess Bintikidiya and prince Hammurabi III the heir of Alalakh. This indicates the royal status of Sarra-El, which led prof. Michael C. Astour to believe that Sarra-El is the probable son of Yarim-Lim III.

== Reign ==
Idrimi's and Niqmepa's inscriptions indicate that Sarra-El was a prince of Yamhad but he is not confirmed as a king. Trevor Bryce believes him to be the king who restored the royal family of Yamhad, others such as Astour and prof. Eva Von Dassow attribute this to his son Abba-El II.

Aleppo was rebuilt and became the capital again soon after the assassination of Mursili I, but the name Yamhad went out of use, and the monarch's title became the King of Halab.

Mursili I died around 1590 BC, and the restoration happened not very long after his death, which would put Sarra-El's reign (if he was a king) in the first quarter of the 16th century BC.

== Successor and the Kingdom of Halab ==
The date of Sarra-El's death is not known. Abba-El II is confirmed as Sarra-El's son and successor through his royal seal. In the next decades Aleppo regained Niya, Mukis (Alalakh region) and Ama'u.

King Sarra-El of Yamhad (Halab) Yamhad dynasty
Regnal titles
Preceded by Hammurabi III	King of Yamhad c. 1600 - c. 1575 BC	Succeeded by Abba-El II
