= Yamhad dynasty =

Ancient Amorite royal family

Yamhad Dynasty
- Country: Syria - Turkey
- Founded: 1810 BC
- Founder: Sumu-Epuh, King of Yamhad
- Final ruler: Itur-Addu, King of Mukish (Alalakh)
- Titles: Great King of Yamhad; King of Alalakh (Mukish); Queen consort of Mari
- Estates: Syria, Turkey
- Dissolution: 1344 BC

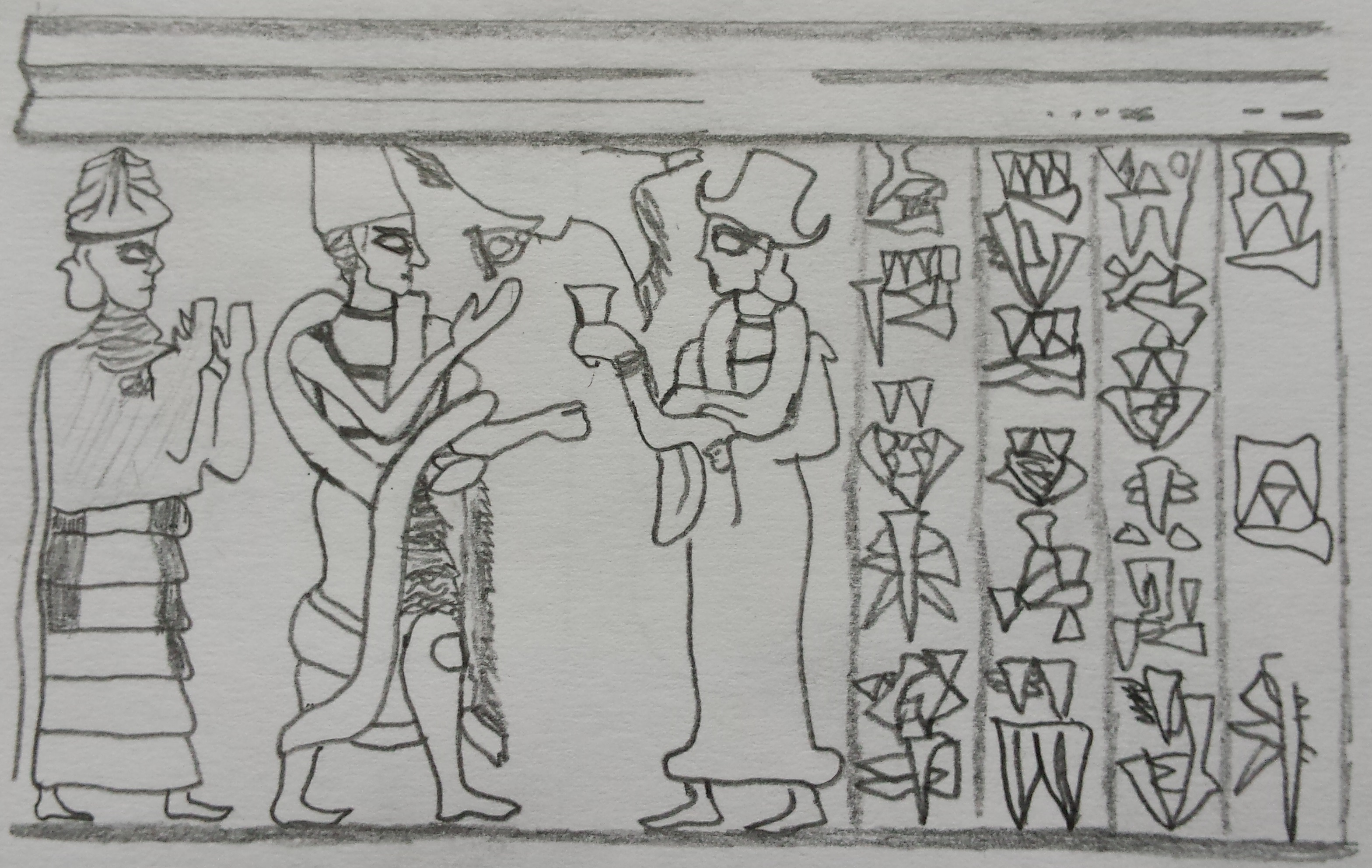
Abba-El I seal

The Yamhad dynasty was an ancient Amorite royal family founded in c. 1810 BC by Sumu-Epuh of Yamhad who had his capital in the city of Aleppo. Started as a local dynasty, the family expanded its influence through the actions of its energetic ruler Yarim-Lim I who turned it into the most influential family in the Levant through both diplomatic and military tools. At its height the dynasty controlled most of northern Syria and the modern Turkish province of Hatay with a cadet branch ruling in the city of Alalakh (Land of Mukish).

The dynasty was ousted during a short Hittite occupation of Aleppo in the beginning of the 16th century BC but was restored and expanded the kingdom again before being driven out of Aleppo by the Mitannians in c. 1524. Idrimi, a member of the dynasty, was able to conquer Alalakh leaving his descendants to rule until the last of them was dethroned by the Hittite king Suppiluliuma I in c. 1344 BC.

== History ==
In all likelihoods Yamhad was a tribal name. The dynasty entered the historic records when the founder Sumu-Epuh was mentioned as an enemy in the inscriptions of Yahdun-Lim of Mari. Sumu-Epuh faced dangerous enemies most important of them was Shamshi-Adad I of the Kingdom of Upper Mesopotamia and was killed in one of the battles. His successor Yarim-Lim I was able to defeat all his enemies becoming a Great King, his reign saw an alliance with Hammurabi of Babylon, and the dynasty became the most influential family in the Levant with the armies of Yamhad campaigning as far away as Diniktum in southern Mesopotamia next to Elam borders. Dynastic marriages played a part in the dynasty policy and included royal members of many kingdoms such as Ebla and Mari, whose King Zimri-Lim was married to Shibtu the daughter of Yarim-Lim I.

Hammurabi I (re. c. 1764 BC) son of Yarim-Lim I ruled a prosperous Kingdom, The dynasty hegemony remained unchallenged and he was able to add Carchemish to his vassals, his successor Abba-El I installed his younger brother Yarim-Lim on the throne of Alalakh in c. 1735 BC, thus creating a cadet branch of the dynasty under the hegemony of the great king in Aleppo.

=== In Aleppo ===
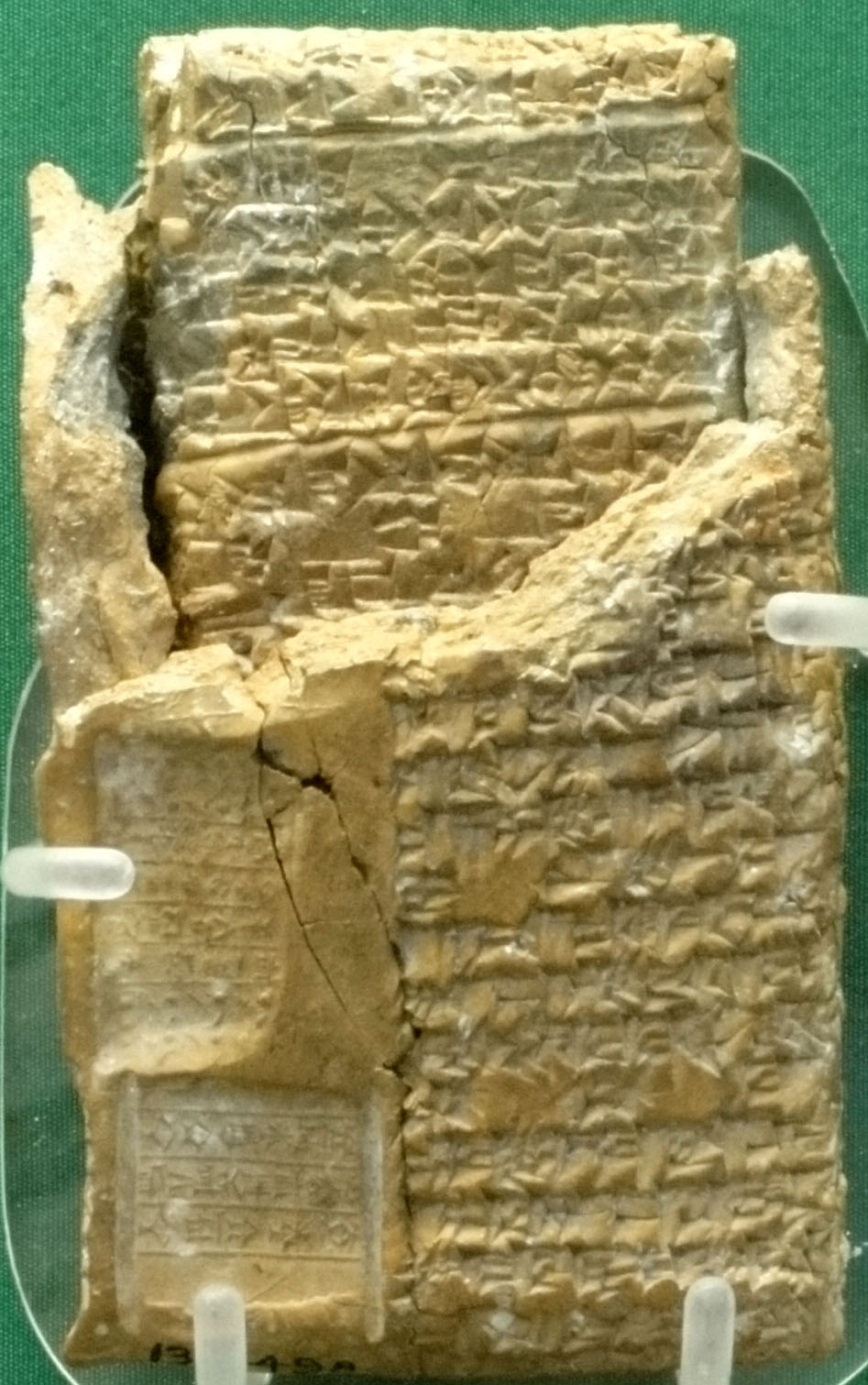
Legal case from Niqmi-Epuh to the king of Alalakh

The line of great kings in aleppo continued to hold hegemony over other Syrian kingdoms, Abba-El I was succeeded by his son Yarim-Lim II whose reign isn't well attested, his successors Niqmi-Epuh and Irkabtum fought with the Hurrian principalities and guaranteed the kingdom dominance in the north. The short reign of Hammurabi II was followed by Yarim-Lim III who defeated the dynasty old rival Qatna, but the danger came from the north as the Hittite king Hattusili I launched a series of destructive campaigns against the allies of the kingdom starting with Alalakh which fell in c. 1650 BC. The war continued for many years and ended with the sacking of Aleppo and the capture of Hammurabi III in c. 1600 BC by Mursili I the successor of Hattusili.

After the assassination of Mursili, Sarra-El a prince and a possible son of Yarim-Lim III regained aleppo and ruled a much smaller kingdom that again included Alalakh. He was succeeded by his son Abba-El II, then his grandson Ilim-Ilimma I who was the last member of the dynasty to rule Aleppo as its king, he was killed in c. 1524 BC which put an end to the kingdom of Yamhad.

=== In Alalakh ===
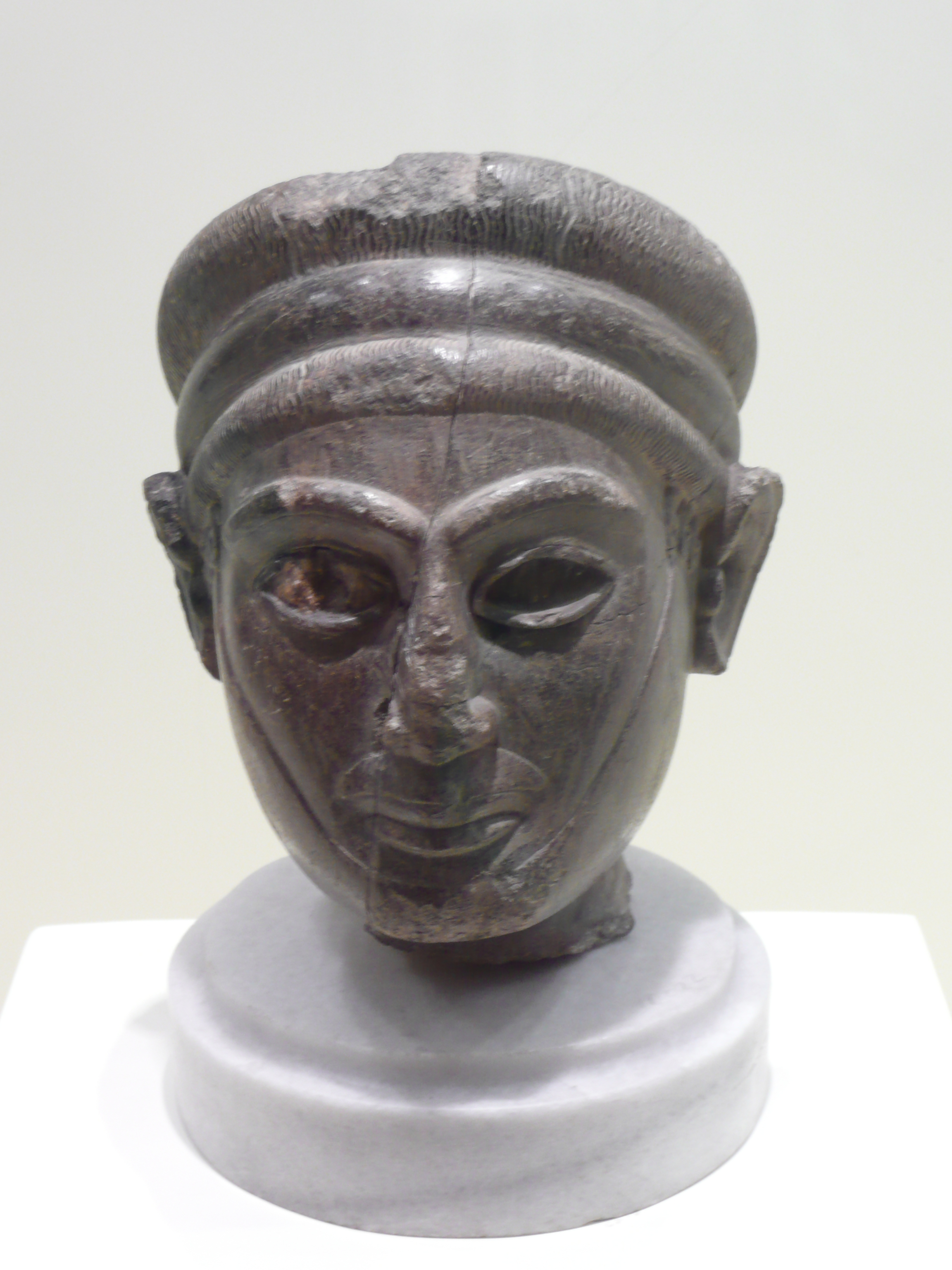
Yarim-Lim of Alalakh

Two cadet branches ruled Alalakh, the first was founded by Yarim-Lim son of Hammurabi I in c. 1735, he had an exceptional long reign so did his successor Ammitakum who started to reign at the beginning of Niqmi-Epuh term and died shortly before the sack of Alalakh. Ammitakum asserted his autonomy from Yamhad without declaring an independent kingdom, he declared his son prince Hammurabi as his heir in the presence of Yarim-Lim III who had no part in making that decision, those acts probably played a part in Aleppo decision not to send reinforcements to protect Alalakh from the Hittites who sacked it ending the first branch rule in c. 1650 BC.

The second branch was established by Idrimi the son of Ilim-Ilimma I who managed to conquer Alalakh seven years after his escape from Aleppo which fell to the hands of the Mitannian king Parshatatar. Idrimi ruled Alalakh and its area which was called the Kingdom of Mukish as a vassal to Mitanni and was attested campaigning against the Hittites, he was succeeded by his son Addu-nirari, then his second son Niqmepa who controlled aleppo as a vassal to Mitanni, he was succeeded by Ilim-Ilimma II, who left his son Itur-Addu as the last king of the dynasty, Itur-Addu allied with Nuhašše and Niya to face the armies of the Hittite king Suppiluliuma I, who defeated Itur-Addu and annexed both Aleppo and Alalakh in c. 1344 BC.

== Members ==
Bold text : Great king.

=== Kings in Aleppo ===
- Sumu-Epuh c. 1810-1780 BC
- **Yarim-Lim I** c. 1780-1764 BC
- **Hammurabi I** c. 1764-1750 BC
- **Abba-El I** c. 1750-1720 BC
- **Yarim-Lim II** c. 1720-1700 BC
- **Niqmi-Epuh** c. 1700-1675 BC
- **Irkabtum** c. 1675 - Middle 17th century BC
- **Hammurabi II** Middle 17th century BC
- **Yarim-Lim III** Middle 17th century BC - c. 1625 BC
- Hammurabi III c. 1625-1600 BC
- Sarra-El Early 16th century BC
- Abba-El II Middle 16th century BC
- Ilim-Ilimma I Middle 16th century BC - c. 1524 BC

=== Kings in Alalakh ===
- Yarim-Lim c. 1735- Early 17th century BC
- Ammitakum 17th century BC
- Idrimi c. 1517-1480 BC
- Niqmepa Middle 15th century BC
- Addu-nirari 15th century BC
- Ilim-Ilimma II
- Itur-Addu c. ? -1344 BC

=== Other members ===
- Sumunna-Abi: Queen of Sumu-Epuh and Yarim-Lim I mother.
- Gashera: Queen of Yarim-Lim I and Hammurabi I mother.
- Shibtu: daughter of Yarim-Lim I and queen consort of Zimri-Lim of Mari.
- Tatteya: daughter of Hammurabi I.
- Nakkusse: son of Hammurabi I, held high position in the court of his brother Yarim-Lim of Alalakh.
- Hammurabi son of Ammitakum of Alalakh, his succession to the throne is dubious.
- Abba-El: son of Niqmi-Epuh.
- Bintikidiya: a princess mentioned in a tablet from Alalakh, filiation unknown.

=== Family tree ===
King of Aleppo - King of Alalakh - Queen - Prince - Princess - Dotted line : relation uncertain.

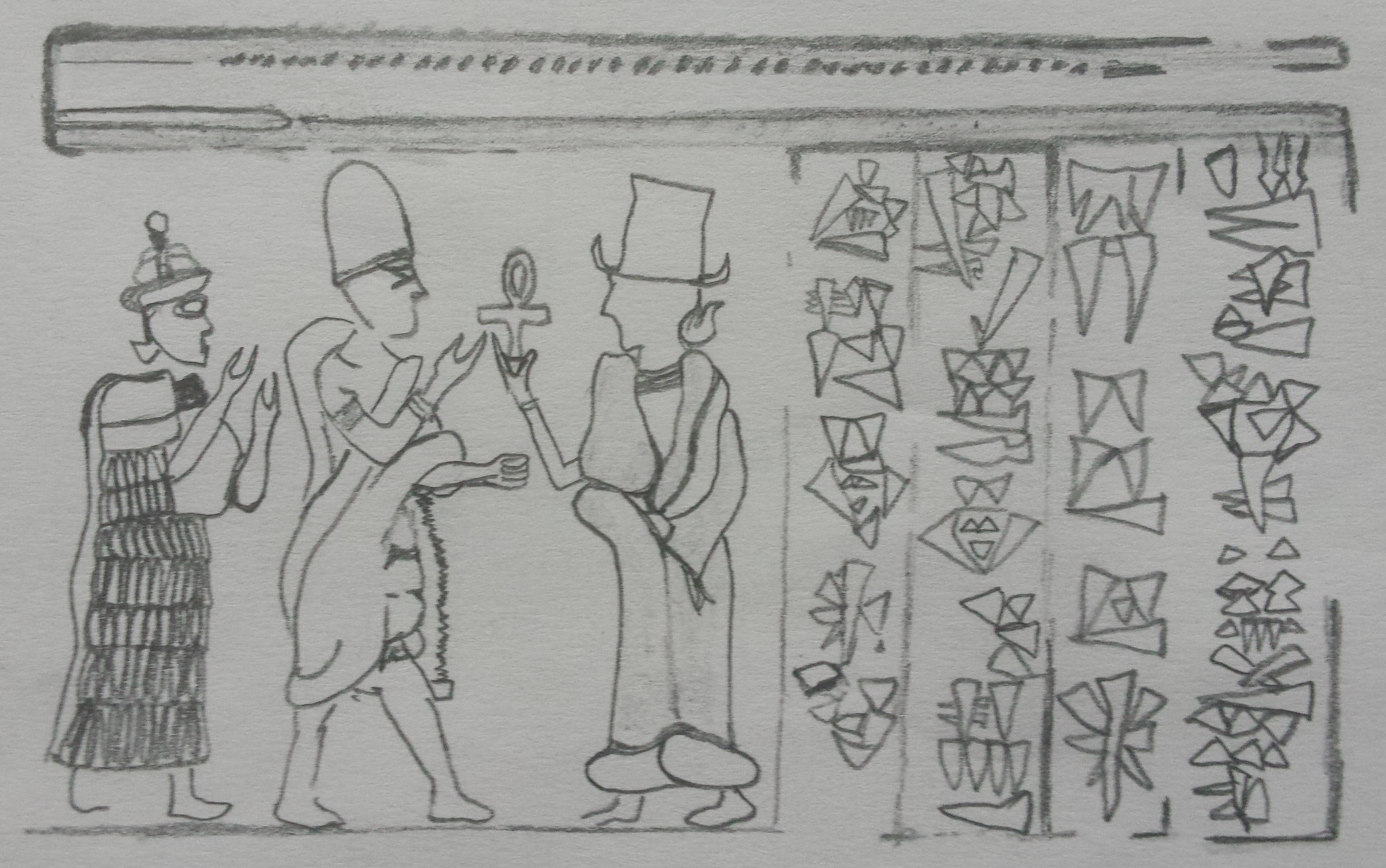
Yarim-Lim II seal

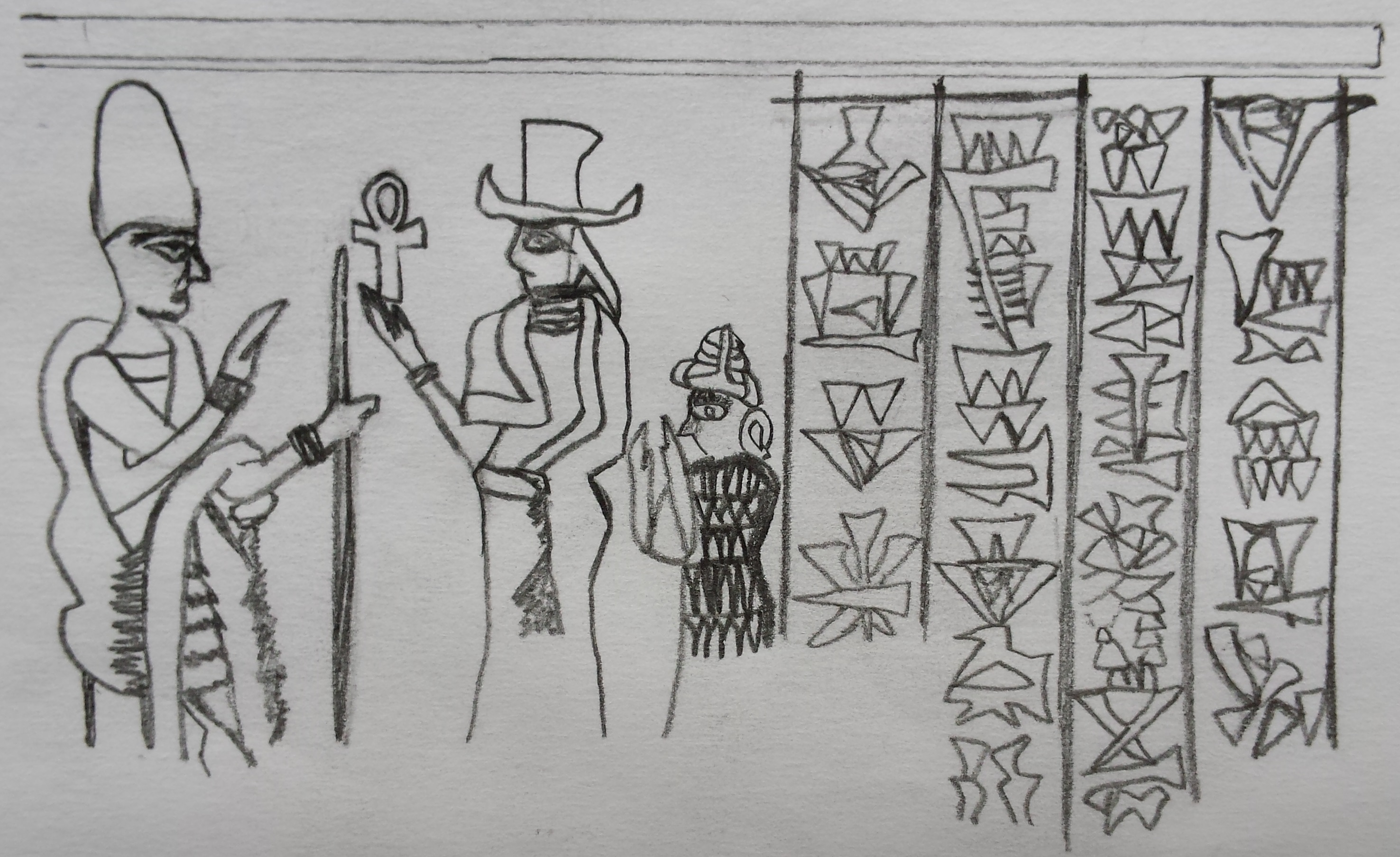
Niqmi-Epuh seal

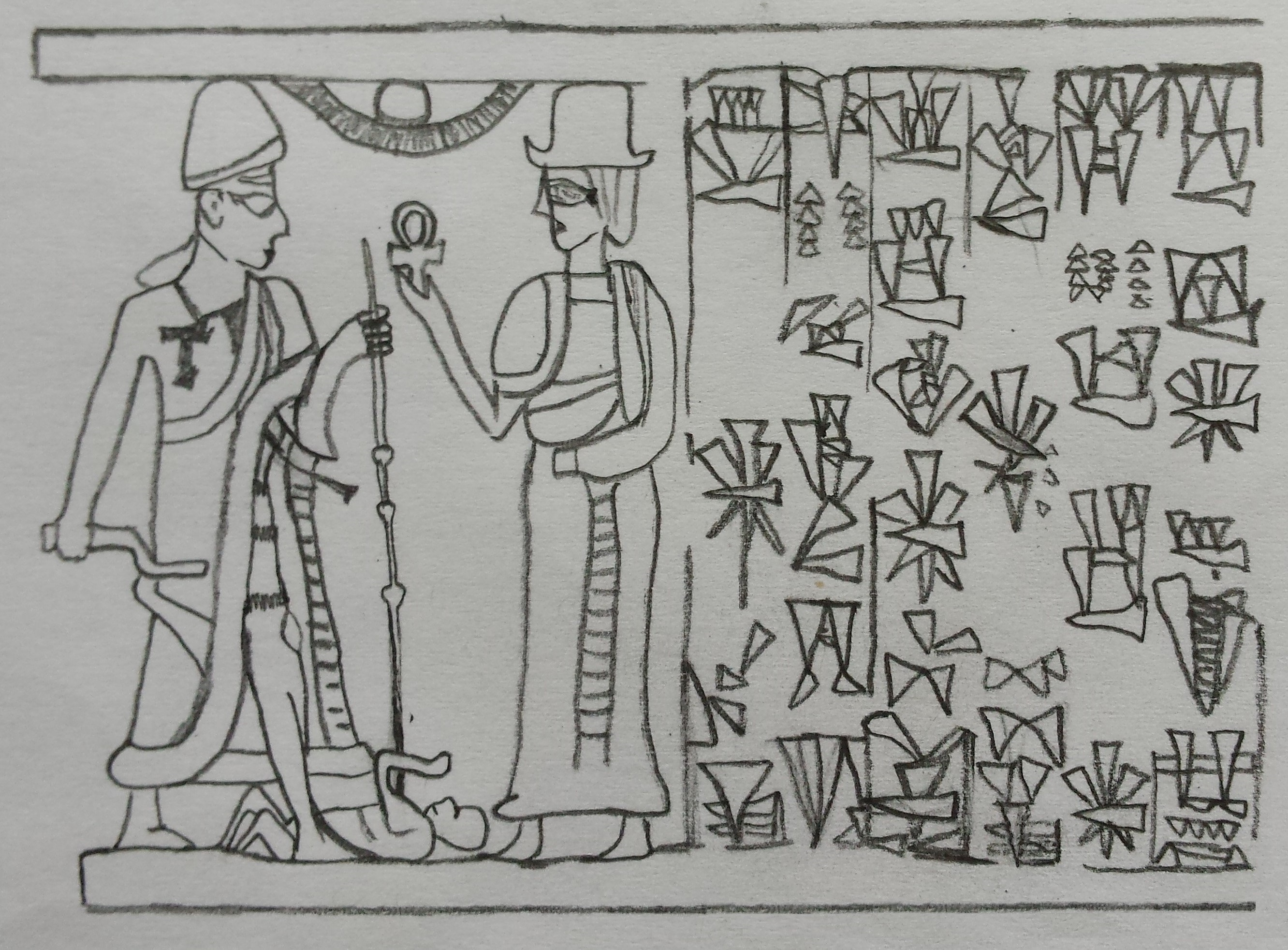
Abba-El II seal

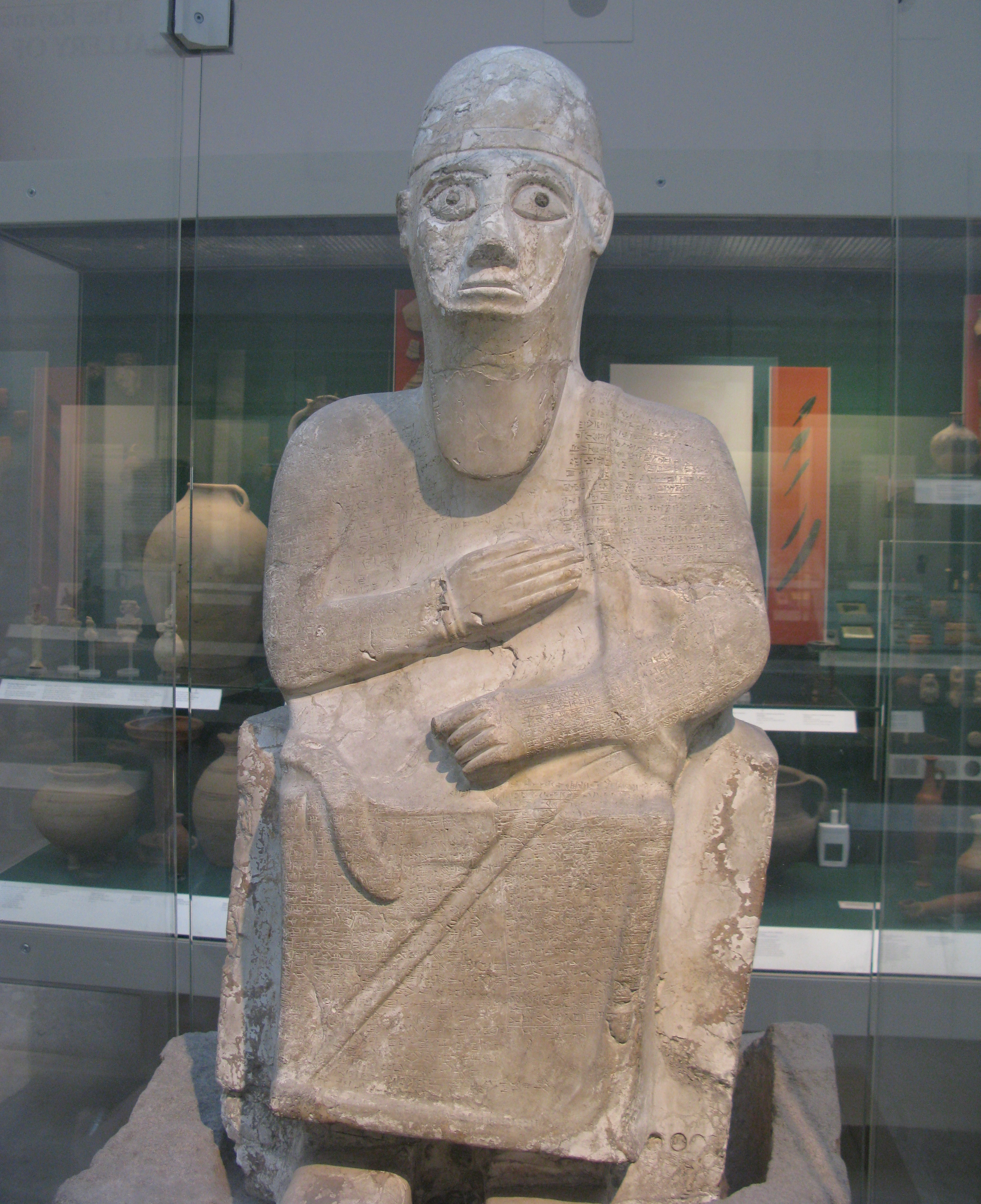
Idrimi of Alalakh

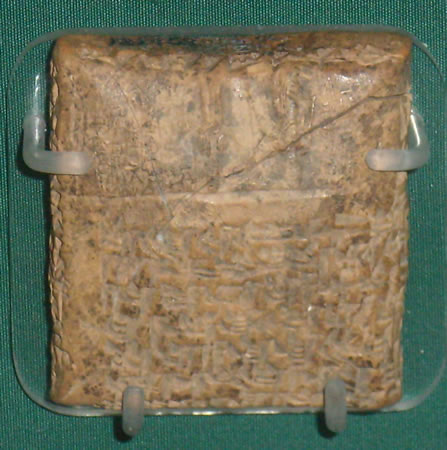
Tablet of Niqmepa with the seal of Abba-El II used

**Sumu-Epuh** re. 1810-1780 BC	Sumunna-Abi
**Yarim-Lim I** re. 1780-1764 BC	Gashera
**Hammurabi I** re. 1764-1750 BC	Shibtu	**Zimri-Lim**
Tatteya	Nakkusse	**Yarim-Lim of Alalakh** re. 1735-? BC	**Abba-El I** re. 1750-1720 BC
**Ammitakum**	**Yarim-Lim II** re. 1720-1700 BC
Hammurabi	**Niqmi-Epuh** re. 1700-1675 BC
Abba-El	**Irkabtum** re. 1675- Middle 17th century BC	**Hammurabi II** re. Middle 17th century BC	**Yarim-Lim III** re. Middle 17th century BC -1625 BC
**Sarra-El** re. Early 16th century BC	**Hammurabi III** re. 1625-1600 BC
**Abba-El II** re. Middle 16th century BC
**Ilim-Ilimma I** re. Middle 16th century BC - 1524 BC
**Idrimi** re. 1517-1480 BC
**Niqmepa**	**Addu-nirari**
**Ilim-Ilimma II**
**Itur-Addu**

== See also ==
- List of rulers of Aleppo
- Amorites
