= Hammurabi III =

- King of Yamhad
- Reign: c. 1625 BC – c. 1600 BC. Middle chronology
- Predecessor: Yarim-Lim III
- Successor: interregnum next king of Halab was : Sarra-El

Hammurabi III (reigned c. 1625 BC – c. 1600 BC - Middle chronology) was the king of Yamhad (Halab) succeeding Yarim-Lim III.

== Identity ==
Hammurabi III is probably a son of Yarim-Lim III, however there is two confusions regarding his identity.

=== Confusion with Hammurabi II ===
Hammurabi III was thought to be the same king Hammurabi mentioned in Alalakh tablets AlT 21,22 but it is known that Yarim-Lim III was the king of Yamhad during the destruction of Alalakh and the Hittite annals (dating after the destruction of Alalakah) mention king Hammurabi, son of Yarim-Lim III, therefore the Hammurabi in tablets AlT 21,22 can not be the same king as Hammurabi the son of Yarim-Lim III, which led to the distinction between the two monarchs. The Hammurabi mentioned in AlT 21,22 is Hammurabi II, a predecessor to Yarim-Lim III while the Hammurabi mentioned in the Hittite annals is Hammurabi III, son of Yarim-Lim III.

The tablets of Alalakh (the main source for the life of Aleppan Kings) ended with Hattusili I's destruction of Alalakh. This led to the information about Aleppo being scarce.

=== Confusion with Hammurabi Son of Ammitakum ===
Hammurabi III is mentioned in the annals of Hattusili I. Another confusion about his identity arose due to the fact that Ammitakum, king of Alalakh's son and heir was also named Hammurabi. Ammitakum appointed his son as his successor in the presence of Yarim-Lim III, the Hittite texts in connection to the Aleppan wars mentions Yarim-Lim III as the king of Aleppo, also they mentions Hammurabi of Aleppo, son of a king whose name is destroyed. Which caused Michael B. Rowton to give two possibilities about the identity of this Hammurabi, the first is that Hammurabi III was the son of Ammitaqum, the second is that Hammurabi III was the son of Yarim-Lim III, Benno Landsberger believes that Hammurabi of Alalakh is identical with Hammurabi III of Yamhad.

== Reign ==
=== War with the Hittites ===
==== Hattusili I ====
Hattusili I conducted a series of destructive campaigns against Aleppo and its vassals during the reign of Yarim-Lim III. He continued his campaigns against Hammurabi, and finally attacked Aleppo the capital but was repelled, wounded and ultimately died of his wounds in ca. 1620 BC.

- Destruction of Alalakh VII (Early MB IIB)

==== Mursili I ====
Before his death, Hattusili proclaimed his young grandchild Mursili as his heir. The Hittite attacks stopped temporarily until Mursili reached manhood. The new Hittite king's attack was characterized with personal need for revenge against Hammurabi and Aleppo, he wanted to avenge Hattusili's blood as it is written in a Hittite text. Mursili's onslaught was decisive: he destroyed Aleppo and moved the captives and booty to Hattusa, ending the kingdom of Yamhad as a power in the Near East around ca. 1600-1590 BC.

- Destruction of Ebla Mardikh IIIB2 (Late MB IIB)

== Fate and Succession ==
The Hittite texts mentions that the king of Aleppo was captured and made atonement to Mursili. How Hammurabi made this atonement is unknown, as is his ultimate fate. Aleppo was rebuilt, after the assassination of Mursili, by Sarra-El a prince of Aleppo (probably a son of Yarim-Lim III) who regained the throne. But Yamhad never regained its former status.

King Hammurabi III of Yamhad (Halab) Yamhad dynasty
Regnal titles
Preceded by Yarim-Lim III	King of Yamhad; 1625 – 1600 BC	Vacant Title next held by Sarra-El as king of Halab
