= Ilim-Ilimma I =

- King of Halab (Yamhad)
- Reign: Middle 16th century BC – c. 1524 BC
- Predecessor: Abba-El II
- Successor: Kingdom abolished next king of Halab was : Telepinus.

Ilim-Ilimma I (reigned middle 16th century BC - c. 1524 BC - Middle chronology) was the king of Yamhad (present-day Halab) succeeding his father Abba-El II.

== Reign ==
Ilim-Ilimma is known through the inscriptions found on the Statue of his Son Idrimi: his queen belonged to Emar royalty, and he had many children of which Idrimi was the youngest.

=== Fall of Yamhad ===
Ilim-Ilimma was under the threats of king Parshatatar of Mitanni, and a rebellion probably instigated by him ended Ilim-Ilimma's reign and life in ca. 1524 BC, and the royal family fled to Emar.

== Dynasty's Fate ==
Aleppo came under the authority of Mitanni, while Idrimi stayed in exile for seven years, after which he conquered Alalakh and continued the dynasty as the King of Mukis. Ilim-Ilimma I was the last king of the Yamhad dynasty to rule as King of Halab; his grandchild Niqmepa might have controlled Halab, but as king of Alalakh.

Ancestors of Ilim-Ilimma I

16. Niqmi-Epuh of Yamhad
8. Yarim-Lim III of Yamhad
4. Sarra-El of Yamhad
2. Abba-El II of Yamhad
1. Ilim-Ilimma I of Alalakh

Ilim-Ilimma I of Halab Yamhad dynasty Died: 1525 BC
Regnal titles
Preceded by Abba-El II	King of Halab (Yamhad) – 1525 BC	Vacant Title next held by Telepinus
