= Abba-El II =

King of Yamhad (died c. 1550 BC)

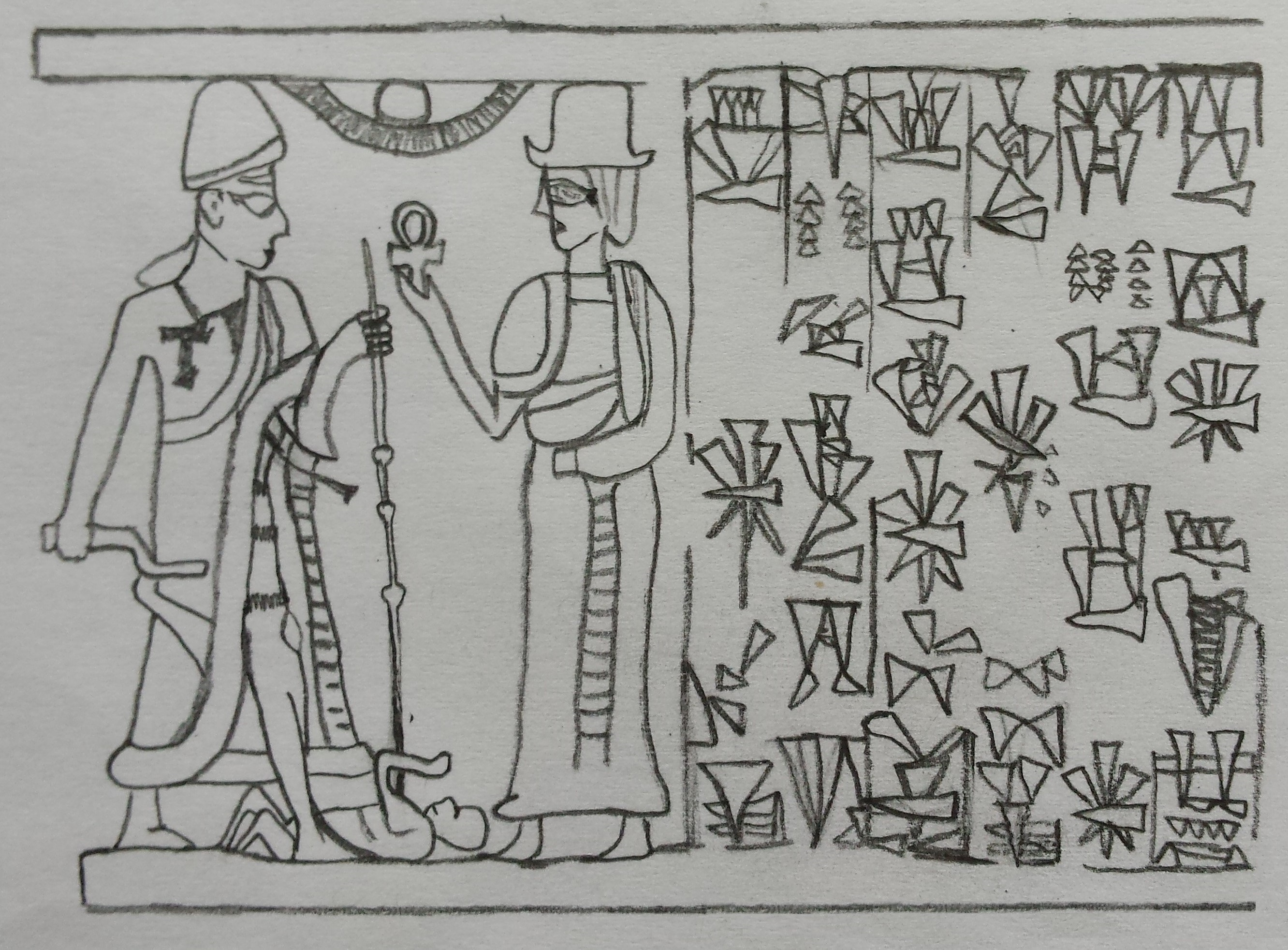

King of Yamhad
- Reign: c. 1575 - c. 1550 BC
- Predecessor: Sarra-El
- Successor: Ilim-Ilimma I
- Died: c. 1550 BC

Abba-El II (died c. 1550 BC) was a king of Yamhad who reigned after the withdrawal of the Hittites.

== Reign ==
Abba-El II is known through his Royal Seal used by his descendant Niqmepa, king of Alalakh as a dynastic seal. In the seal he is described as the mighty king, servant of Hadad, beloved of Hadad, devotee of Hadad, which were the titles that the old kings of Yamhad used. While the seal mentions the name of Abba-El II, the king depicted in it could be Abba-El I.

According to prof. Trevor Bryce, Aleppo was restored by Abba-El's father Sarra-Ee; however, other Historians such as Michael C. Astour consider Abba-El II to be the king who restored the kingdom.

Aleppo recovered from the Hittite invasion and expanded its territory to some of its former lands including Alalakh, Niya, and Ama'u.

== Succession ==
Abba-El's immediate successor was his probable son Ilim-Ilimma I, the father of Idrimi who continued the dynasty of Yamhad in Alalakh after Aleppo fell to Mitanni around 1525 BC.

Abba-El II of Halab Yamhad dynasty
Regnal titles
Preceded by Sarra-El	King of Yamhad c. 1575 - c. 1550 BC	Succeeded by Ilim-Ilimma I
