= Hammurabi II =

- Great King of Yamhad
- Reign: Middle 17th century BC
- Predecessor: Irkabtum
- Successor: Yarim-Lim III

Hammurabi II (reigned Middle 17th century BC - Middle chronology) was an obscure king of Yamhad (Halab), probably reigning after Irkabtum.

== Identity ==
Hammurabi II was confused with Hammurabi III, the king of Yamhad who was mentioned as the son of the king of Halab in the annals of Hattusili I.

The Alalakh tablets AlT 21 and AlT 22, (naturally made before the destruction of Alalakh) mentions Hammurabi as king, while the Hammurabi mentioned in the Hittites annals (after the destruction of Alalakh) was attested as the son of king Yarim-Lim and since the destruction of Alalakh occurred while Yarim-Lim III was king, then the Hammurabi in tablets AlT 21 and 22 can not be the same Hammurabi, son and successor of Yarim-Lim III.

== Position and Succession ==
Nothing (except his existence) is known about Hammurabi II. His filiation is unknown but since he is mentioned before the destruction of Alalakh (and Yarim-Lim III was the king during and after the destruction) then he must have been succeeded by Yarim-Lim III (but even this is under debate).

King Hammurabi II of Yamhad (Halab) Yamhad dynasty
Regnal titles
Preceded by Irkabtum	Great King of Yamhad	Succeeded by Yarim-Lim III
