= Yarim-Lim III =

- Great King of Yamhad
- Reign: c. Middle 17th century BC – c. 1625 BC. Middle chronology
- Predecessor: Hammurabi II
- Successor: Hammurabi III

Yarim-Lim III (reigned c. Middle 17th century BC - c. 1625 BC - Middle chronology) was the king of Yamhad (Halab) succeeding Hammurabi II.

== Reign ==
Yarim-Lim ascended the throne at a time of internal disintegration for Yamhad, combined with foreign threats represented with the rise of the Hittites. He was either the son of Niqmi-Epuh or Irkabtum.

=== First Years and Internal Affairs ===
Yarim-Lim fought and won against Qatna in his early years, but Yamhad's weakness was clear. Ammitakum of Alalakh declared himself king but not as independent ruler, he acknowledged Yarim-Lim as his suzerain and appointed his son Hammurabi as his heir in the presence of Yarim-Lim, declaring him a servant to the great king of Yamhad. Yarim-Lim was a passive actor in naming the heir to Alalakh

=== War with the Hittites ===
During Middle Bronze IIB, around 1620s BCE, the Hittite king Hattusili I attacked Yamhad. Some scholars argue that he exploited Alalakh's proclamation of sovereignty and the internal dissent it caused in Yamhad. He attacked Alalakh in the second year of his Syrian campaigns and conquered it, cutting Aleppo's route to the sea. Yarim-Lim did not send troops to aid Alalakh and the city was destroyed. Hattusili I then attacked Urshu. Yarim-Lim and Carchemish sent aid to the city in vain, and Hattusili destroyed it.

The Hurrians supported by Yarim-Lim attacked Hattusili's newly acquired lands while he was campaigning against Arzawa. He came back on his second campaign, this time fighting Aleppo directly.

In the sixth year of his Syrian campaigns, Hattusili headed toward Hassuwa (Khashshum). Yarim-Lim sent the Aleppan army under the leadership of General Zukrassi, the heavy-armed troops leader accompanied by General Zaludis, the commander of the Manda troops. The army consisted of about a hundred chariots and thousands of foot soldiers. The battle took place near Atalur mountain (located north of Aleppo, not very far from the Amanus, it can be identified with the Kurd-Dagh Mountains). Hattusili emerged victorious. Then he destroyed Hassuwa and moved on destroying Yamhad's other Hurrian allies such as Zippasna and Hahhum. Hattusuli then crossed the Euphrates, comparing himself with Sargon of Akkad and returned to Hattusa.

== Death and succession ==
The date of Yarim-Lim's death is not known, but he died and was succeeded by Hammurabi III his possible son or cousin, before Hattusili's direct attack on the city of Aleppo which ended in his defeat.

King Yarim-Lim III of Yamhad (Halab) Yamhad dynasty Died: 1625 BC
Regnal titles
| Preceded by Hammurabi II | Great King of Yamhad – 1625 BC | Succeeded by Hammurabi III |
