= Niqmepa, King of Mukish =

Niqmepa

King of Mukish
- Reign: c. 1450 BC
- Father: Idrimi

Niqmepa (Niqmepuh; fl. c. 1450 BC) was a King of Mukish, centered on the capital city of Alalakh in the mid or late 15th century BC.

== Early life ==
=== Family ===
Niqmepa was the son of Idrimi. He may have been a brother of Addu-Nirari.

== Reign ==
=== Accession ===
Not much is known about how Niqmepa came to power. He was a son of Idrimi. Also a certain Addu-Nirari is mentioned as son and heir to Idrimi. This makes the order of succession unclear. It is possible that Idrimi was succeeded by Addu-Nirari and then Niqmepa.

For signing some of his documents, Niqmepa used the Royal Seal of his ancestor Abba-El II as a dynastic seal. Abba-El II was the king of Halab (formerly Yamhad) in the 16th century BC.

=== Vassalage of Mitanni ===
The Kingdom of Mukish (Alalakh IV) was a vassal of Mitanni. Niqmepa appears to have been subject to the Mitanni king Shaushtatar as his overlord. Mitanni was competing with Egypt for dominance in Syria.

=== Dispute between Kizzuwatna and Mukish ===
A dispute between king Sunassura of Kizzuwatna and Niqmepa of Mukish was adjudicated by Shaushtatar. This is recorded on two tablets (AIT 13 and AIT 14) that were found at Alalakh. They provide an important synchronism for establishing the timelines of these ruling dynasties.

== Attestations ==
Evidence for the reign of King Niqmepa is based on clay cuneiform tablets excavated at Tell Atchana by Charles Woolley.

Clay tablets mentioning King Niqmepa
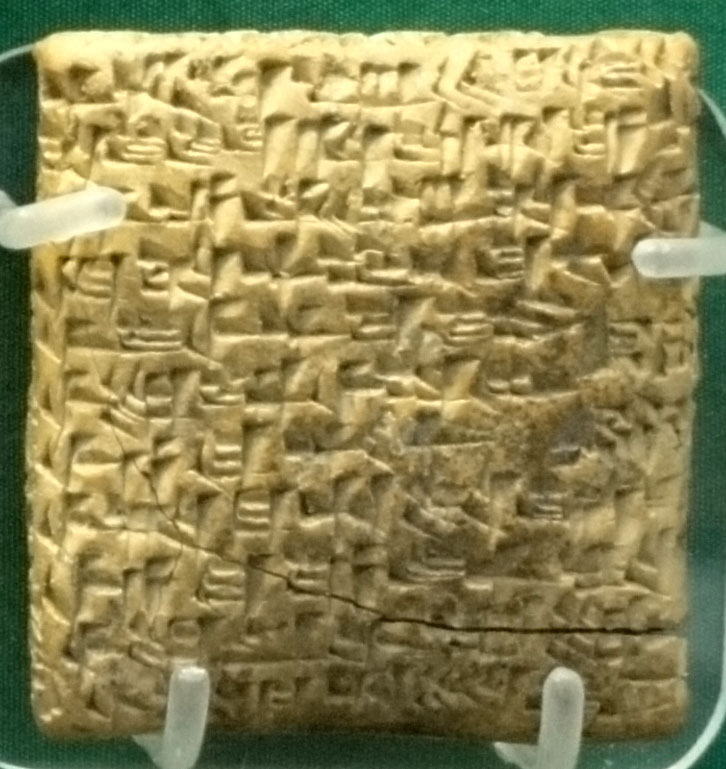
Tablet AlT 015 from Alalah with a grant of 'mariannu-ship' from King Niqmepa to Qabia

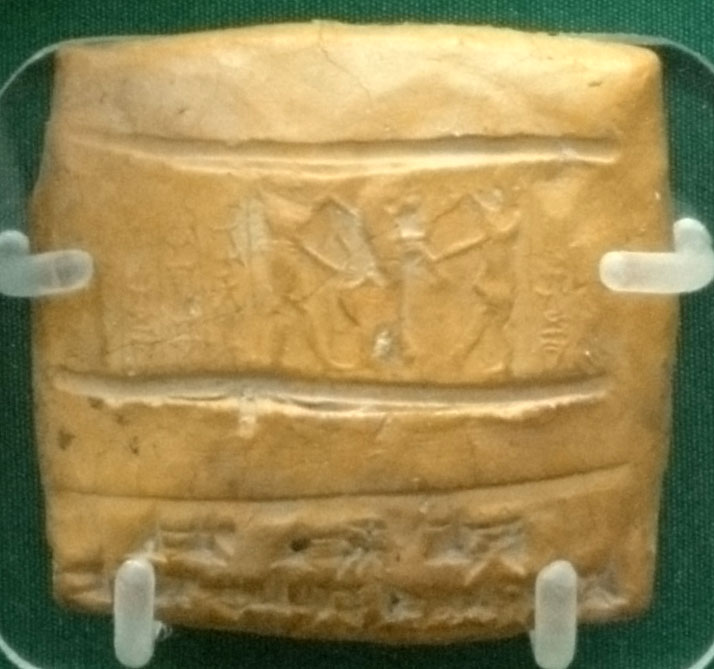
Cuneiform clay tablet AlT 016 with a legal case brought before Niqmepa, the king of Mukish

A treaty between Ir-Teššob of Tunip and Niqmepa of Alalaḫ is also preserved (AlT 2).

The relationship between Halab (Aleppo) and Alalakh at the time of Niqmepa is illuminated by five texts found at Level IV of Alalakh. Among them is the text AlT 101, which is a receipt showing that Niqmepa of Alalah's returned some fugitives from Aleppo to Wantaraššura, who was probably the ruler of Aleppo at that time. This indicates that Niqmepa was recognizing Halab as a significant regional power.

== See also ==
- Yamhad dynasty
