= Yamhad =

Semitic kingdom in Syria

Yamhad Halab
- c. 1810 BC–c. 1517 BC
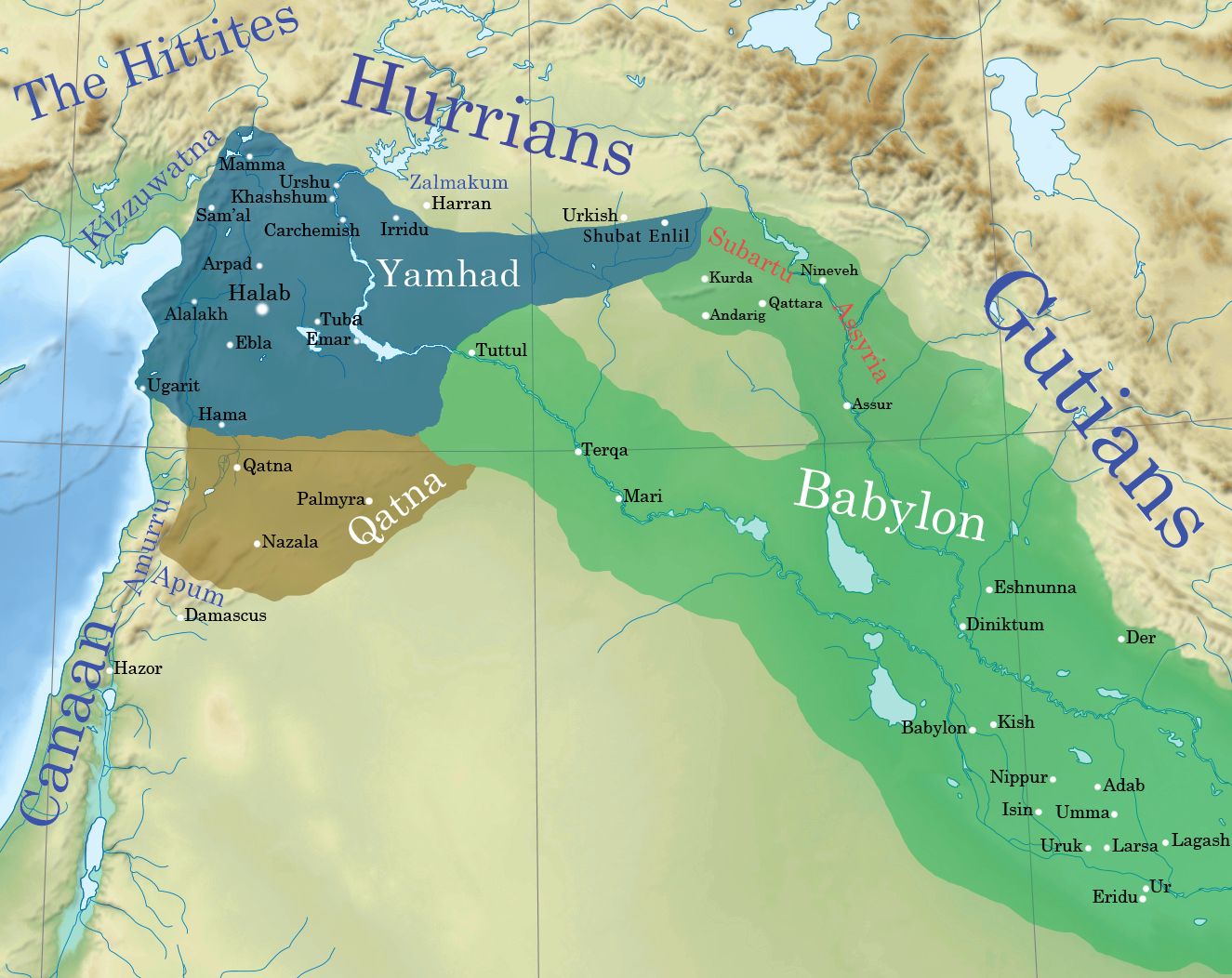
- Yamhad at its greatest extent c. 1752 BC
- Capital: Halab
- Common languages: Amorite; Hurrian (among Hurrians)
- Religion: ancient Levantine religion (Hadad was the chief deity)
- Government: Absolute monarchy
- King, Great King.
  - c. 1810 – c. 1780 BC: Sumu-Epuh
  - c. 1780 – c. 1764 BC: Yarim-Lim I
  - mid. 16th century BC – c. 1524 BC: Ilim-Ilimma I
- Historical era: Bronze Age
  - Established: c. 1810 BC
  - Disestablished: c. 1517 BC

Area
- 1750 BC est.: 43,000 km^{2} (17,000 sq mi)
Preceded by	Succeeded by
Ebla	Mitanni
- Today part of: Syria; Turkey

Yamhad (Yamḫad) was an ancient Semitic-speaking kingdom centered on Ḥalab (Aleppo) in Syria. The kingdom emerged at the end of the 19th century BC and was ruled by the Yamhad dynasty, who counted on both military and diplomacy to expand their realm. From the beginning of its establishment, the kingdom withstood the aggressions of its neighbors Mari, Qatna and the Kingdom of Upper Mesopotamia, and was turned into the most powerful Syrian kingdom of its era through the actions of its king Yarim-Lim I. By the middle of the 18th century BC, most of Syria minus the south came under the authority of Yamhad, either as a direct possession or through vassalage, and for nearly a century and a half, Yamhad dominated northern, northwestern and eastern Syria, and had influence over small kingdoms in Mesopotamia at the borders of Elam. The kingdom was eventually destroyed by the Hittites, then annexed by Mitanni in the 16th century BC.

Yamhad's population was predominately Amorite, and had a typical Bronze Age Syrian culture. Yamhad was also inhabited by a substantial Hurrian population that settled in the kingdom, adding the influence of their culture. Yamhad controlled a wide trading network, being a gateway between the eastern Iranian plateau and the Aegean region in the west. Yamhad worshiped the traditional Northwest Semitic deities, and the capital Halab was considered a holy city among the other Syrian cities as a center of worship for Hadad, who was regarded as the main deity of northern Syria.

== History ==
Little of Halab has been excavated by archaeologists, as Halab was never abandoned during its long history and the modern city is situated above the ancient site. Therefore, most of the knowledge about Yamhad comes from tablets discovered at Alalakh and Mari.

=== Establishment ===
The name Yamhad was likely an Amorite tribal name and is used synonymously with Halab when referring to the kingdom. The city of Halab was a religious center in northern Syria, and was mentioned by the name Ha-lam, as a vassal of the Eblaite empire, which controlled most of Syria in the middle of the third millennium BC. Halab's fame as a Holy City contributed to its later prominence; the main temple of the north Syrian storm god Hadad was located in the city, which was known as the "City of Hadad".

The name Halab as well as that of Yamhad appeared for the first time during the Old Babylonian period, when Sumu-Epuh, the first Yamhadite king, was attested in a seal from Mari as the ruler of the land of Yamhad, which included, in addition to Halab, the cities of Alalakh and Tuba. Sumu-Epuh consolidated the kingdom and faced Yahdun-Lim of Mari who had a dynastic alliance with Yamhad to oppose Assyria, but eventually campaigned in the north threatening the kingdom. The Yamhadite king supported the Yaminite tribes and formed an alliance with other Syrian states including Urshu, Hassum and Carchemish, against the Mariote king who defeated his enemies, who was eventually killed by his own son Sumu-Yamam.

=== Rivalry with the Kingdom of Upper Mesopotamia ===
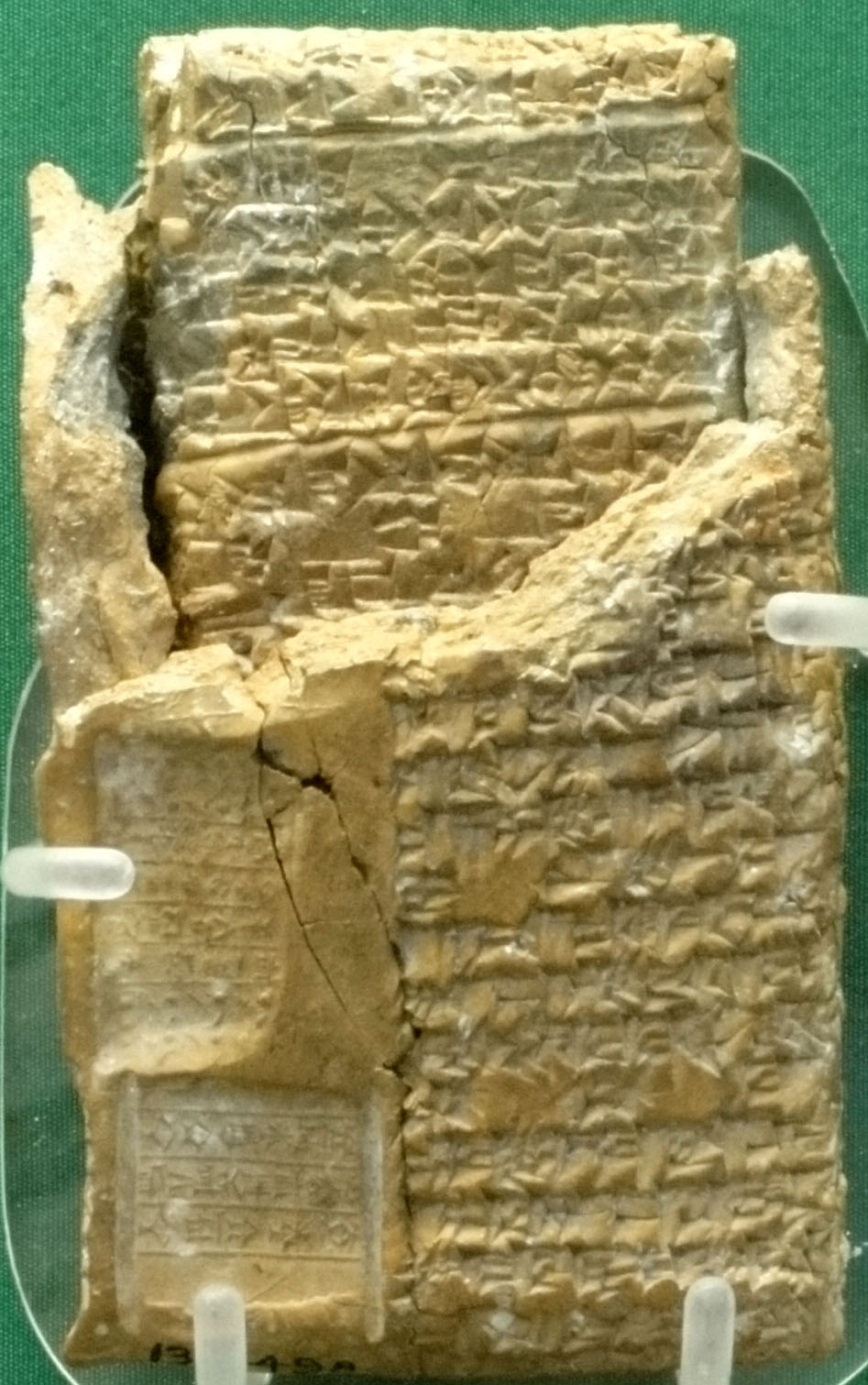
Legal case from Niqmi-Epuh of Yamhad, to the king of Alalakh.

The rise of Shamshi-Adad of the Kingdom of Upper Mesopotamia proved more dangerous to Yamhad than Mari. The Amorite ruler Shamshi-Adad was an ambitious conqueror with the aim to rule Mesopotamia and the Levant, and styled himself as "king of the world". Shamshi-Adad surrounded Yamhad by way of alliances with Charchemish, Hassum and Urshu to the north and by conquering Mari to the east, forcing Zimri-Lim the heir of Mari to flee. Sumu-Epuh welcomed Zimri-Lim and aimed to use him against the Kingdom of Upper Mesopotamia since he was the legitimate heir of Mari.

Shamshi-Adad's most dangerous alliance was with Qatna, whose king Ishi-Addu became his agent at Yamhad's borders and married his daughter to Yasmah-Adad, the son of Shamshi-Adad who was installed by his father as king of Mari. Sumu-Epuh was apparently killed during his fight with Shamshi-Adad and was succeeded by his son Yarim-Lim I, who consolidated his father's kingdom and turned it into the most powerful kingdom in Syria and northern Mesopotamia. Yarim-Lim surrounded Shamshi-Adad by alliances with Hammurabi of Babylon and Ibal-pi-el II of Eshnunna, then in 1777 BC he advanced to the east conquering Tuttul and installing Zimri-Lim as governor of the city. The death of the Shamshi-Adad came a year later. Yarim-Lim then sent his army with Zimri-Lim, to restore his ancestor's throne as an ally-vassal to Yamhad, cementing the relationship through a dynastic marriage between the new Mariote king and Shibtu, the daughter of Yarim-Lim.

"There is no king who is mighty by himself. Ten or fifteen kings follow Hammurabi the ruler of Babylon, a like number of Rim-Sin of Larsa, a like number of Ibal-pi-el of Eshnunna, a like number of Amud-pi-el of Qatanum, but twenty follow Yarim-Lim of Yamhad."

— A tablet sent to Zimri-Lim of Mari, describing Yarim-Lim I authority.

Yarim-Lim spent the next years of his reign expanding the kingdom, which reached Mamma in the north. The Syrian city-states were subdued through alliances or force; Mamma, Ebla and Ugarit became vassals of Yamhad, while Qatna remained independent but came to peace with Yamhad following the death of its ally, the late Shamshi-Adad I. A sample of Yarim-Lim policy of diplomacy and war can be read in a tablet discovered at Mari, that was sent to the king of Dēr in southern Mesopotamia, which included a declaration of war against Der and its neighbor Diniktum, the tablet mentions the stationing of 500 Yamhadite warships for twelve years in Diniktum, and the Yamhadite military support of Der for 15 years. Yarim-Lim's accomplishments elevated Yamhad into the status of a Great Kingdom and the Yamhadite king title became the Great King.

Yarim-Lim I was succeeded by his son Hammurabi I who had a peaceful reign. He was able to force Charchemish into submission, and sent troops to aid Hammurabi of Babylon against Larsa and Elam. The alliance ended after the Babylonian king sacked Mari and destroyed it. Babylon did not attack Yamhad, however, and the relations between the two kingdoms remained peaceful in later years; the power vacuum caused by Mari's fall opened the way for Hammurabi to extend Yamhad's hegemony over the upper Khabur valley in the east, where the ruler of Shubat Enlil became his vassal. Hammurabi I was succeeded by his son Abba-El I, whose reign witnessed the rebellion of the city Irridu, which was under the authority of prince Yarim-Lim, Abba-El's brother. The king responded to the rebellion by destroying Irridu, and compensating his brother by giving him the throne of Alalakh, thus creating a cadet branch of the dynasty.

=== Decline and end ===
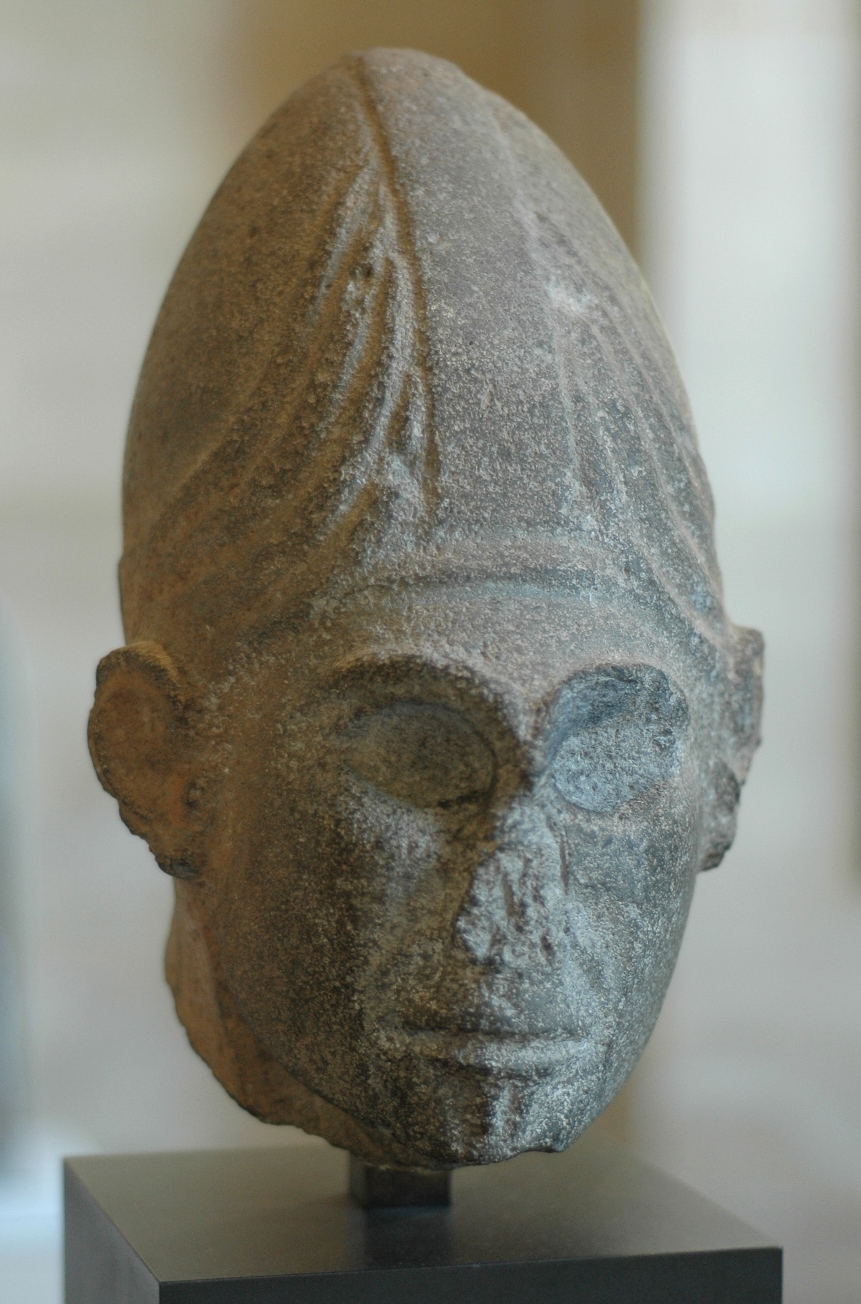
God head, discovered near Jabbul (c. 1600 BC).

The era of Abba-El I's successors is poorly documented, and by the time of Yarim-Lim III in the mid-17th century BC, the power of Yamhad declined due to internal dissent. Yarim-Lim III ruled a weakened kingdom, and although he imposed Yamhadite hegemony over Qatna, the weakening was obvious as Alalakh had become all but independent under the self-declared king Ammitakum. In spite of this regression, the king of Yamhad remained the strongest king of the Syrian states, as he was referred to as a Great King by the Hittites, the diplomatic equal of the Hittite king.

The rise of the Hittite kingdom in the north posed the biggest threat to Yamhad, although Yarim-Lim III and his successor Hammurabi III were able to withstand the aggressions of the Hittite king Hattusili I through alliances with the Hurrian principalities. Hattusili chose not to attack Halab directly and began with conquering Yamhad's vassals and allies, starting with Alalakh in the second year of his Syrian campaigns c. 1650 BC (Middle chronology) or slightly later. Hattusili then turned to attack the Hurrians in Urshu northeast of Halab, and won in spite of military support from Halab and Carchemish for the Hurrians. The Hittite king then defeated Yamhad in the battle of Mount Atalur, and sacked Hassum along with several other Hurrian cities in the sixth year of his Syrian wars. After many campaigns, Hattusili I finally attacked Halab during the reign of Hammurabi III. The attack ended in a defeat, the wounding of the Hittite king and his later death c. 1620 BC. Hattusili's campaigns considerably weakened Yamhad, causing it to decline in status: the monarch ceased to be styled a Great King.

Hattusili was succeeded by his grandson Mursili I, who conquered Halab c. 1600 BC and destroyed Yamhad as a major power in the Levant. Mursili then left for Babylon and sacked it, but was assassinated upon his return to his capital Hattusa, and his empire disintegrated. Halab was rebuilt and the kingdom expanded to include Alalakh again. The reestablished kingdom was ruled by kings of whom nothing but their names is known; the first is Sarra-El, who might have been the son of Yarim-Lim III. The last king of the dynasty to rule as king of Halab was Ilim-Ilimma I, whose reign ended c. 1524 when he was killed during a rebellion orchestrated by king Parshatatar of Mitanni who annexed Halab. Ilim-Ilimma's son, Idrimi, fled to Emar then conquered Alalakh c. 1517 BC. Seven years following his conquest of Alalakh, Idrimi made peace with Mitanni and was acknowledged as a vassal, and allowed to control Halab, though he had to relocate the dynasty's residence to Alalakh and relinquish the title of "King of Halab"; the use of the name Yamhad also ended.

=== Kings of Yamhad ===
Dates are estimated and given by the Middle chronology.

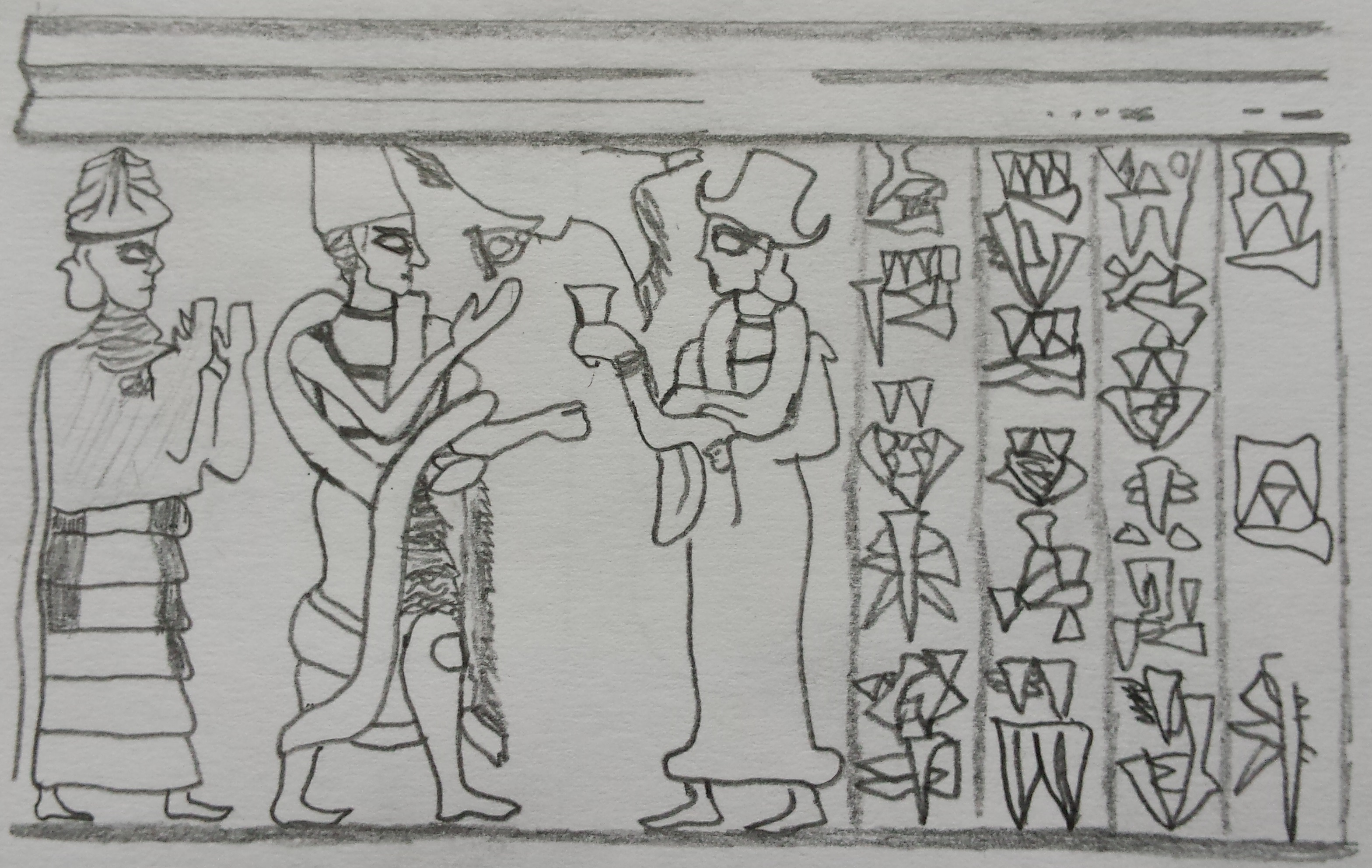
Abba-El I seal.

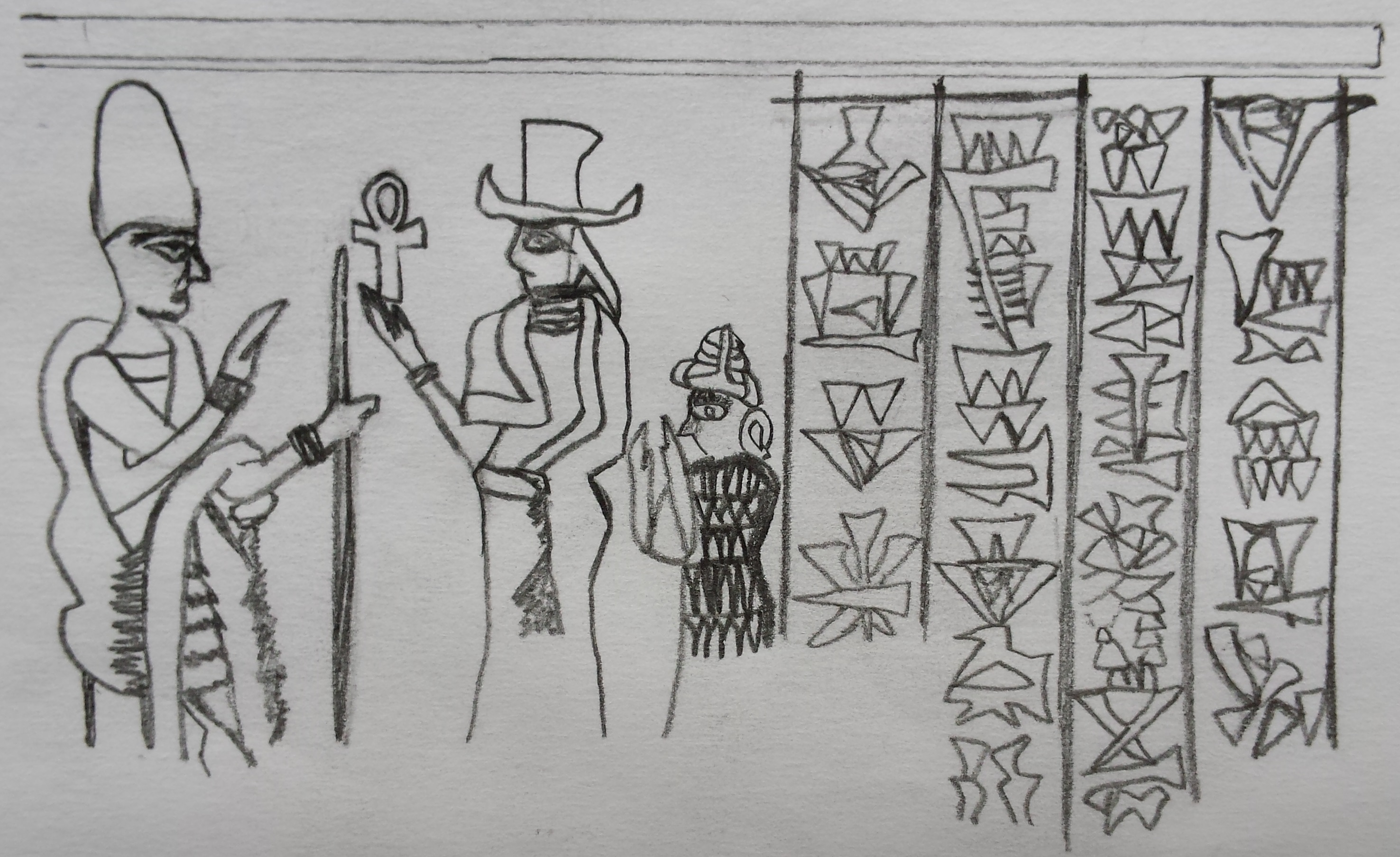
Niqmi-Epuh seal.

King	Reigned	Title	Relation to Previous King
Sumu-Epuh	c. 1810 BC – c. 1780 BC	King
Yarim-Lim I	c. 1780 BC – c. 1764 BC	Great King	Son.
Hammurabi I	c. 1764 BC – c. 1750 BC	Great King	Son.
Abba-El I	c. 1750 BC – c. 1720 BC	Great King	Son.
Yarim-Lim II	c. 1720 BC – c. 1700 BC	Great King	Son.
Niqmi-Epuh	c. 1700 BC – c. 1675 BC	Great King	Son.
Irkabtum	c. 1675 BC – Mid-17th century BC	Great King	Son.
Hammurabi II	Mid-17th century BC	Great King	Possible brother.
Yarim-Lim III	Mid-17th century BC – c. 1625 BC	Great King	Brother of Irkabtum.
Hammurabi III	c. 1625 BC – c. 1600 BC	King	Son.
Sarra-El	Early 16th century BC	King	Possible son of Yarim-Lim III.
Abba-El II	Mid-16th century BC	King	Son.
Ilim-Ilimma I	c. 1524 – c. 1517 BC	King	Possible son.

== People and culture ==
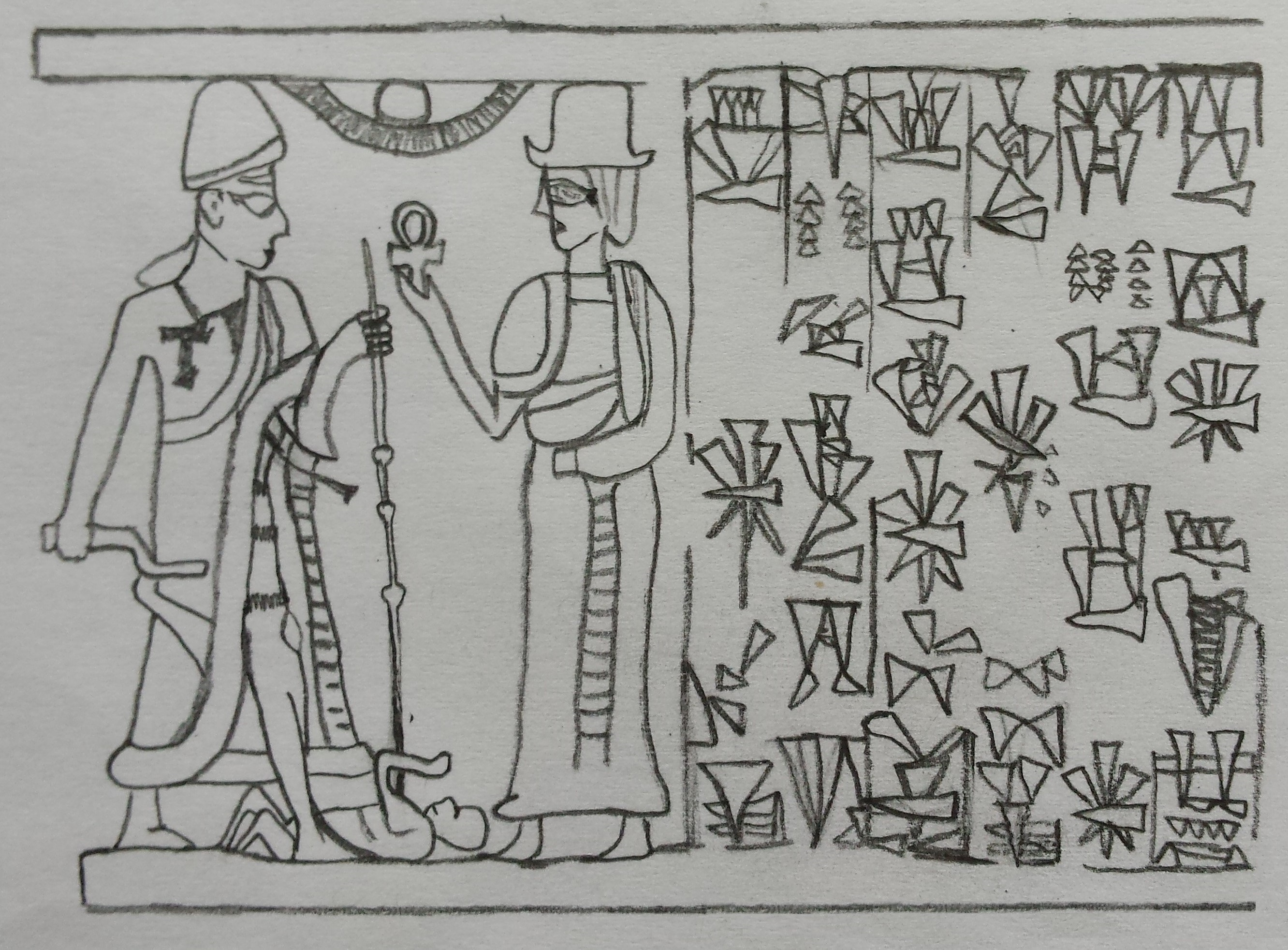
Seal of Abba-El II: the Egyptian ankh was a replacement for the cup usually held by the deity.

The people of Yamhad were Amorites and spoke the Amorite language, and apart from a few Mesopotamian, Egyptian and Aegean influences, Yamhad belonged mainly to middle Bronze Age Syrian culture. This culture influenced the architecture and the functions of the temples, which were mainly cultic, while political authority was invested in the royal palace, in contrast to the important political role of the temples in Mesopotamia.

Since the capital Halab has not been excavated, the architecture of the kingdom is archaeologically best represented by the city of Alalakh, which was subordinate to Halab and ruled by a king belonging to the Yamhadite royal house. The Amorites in general built large palaces that bear architectural similarities to old Babylonian-era palaces. They were adorned with grand central courtyards, throne rooms, tiled floors, drainage systems and plastered walls, which suggest the employment of specialized labor. Evidence exists for the presence of Minoan Aegean fresco artists who painted elaborate scenes on the walls of the palaces in Alalakh.

Yamhad had a distinctive Syrian iconography, which is clear in the seals of the kings that gave prominence to the Syrian gods. Egyptian influence was minimal and limited to the ankh, which cannot be interpreted as an emulation of Egyptian rituals but rather as merely a substitute for the cup held by the deity elsewhere. Yamhad had a special pattern of trim called the Yamhad style, which was favored in Mari during the reign of king Zimri-Lim, whose queen Shibtu was the daughter of Yarim-Lim I.

After the fall of the Akkadian Empire, Hurrians began to settle in the city and its surroundings, and by c. 1725 BC they constituted a sizable portion of the population. The presence of a large Hurrian population brought Hurrian culture and religion to Halab, as evidenced by the existence of certain religious festivals that bear Hurrian names.

== Economy ==
Halab's location has always been a factor in its prominence as an economic center. Yamhad's economy was based on trade with the Iranian Plateau, Mesopotamia, Cyprus and Anatolia, with the city of Emar as its port on the Euphrates, and Alalakh with its proximity to the sea as its port on the Mediterranean.

The actions of Yarim-Lim I and his alliance with Babylon proved vital for the kingdom's economy, for they secured the trade between Mesopotamia and northern Syria, with the king of Mari protecting the caravans crossing from the Persian Gulf to Anatolia. Emar attracted many Babylonian merchants, who lived in the city and had a lasting impact on the local scribal conventions. As late as the 14th century BC, texts of the so-called Syrian type from Emar preserve distinct Babylonian traits.

The markets of Yamhad became a source of copper, which was imported from the mountains (probably Anatolian) and Cyprus. However, the Babylonian invasion of Mari had a negative impact on the trade between the two kingdoms, as the road became dangerous because of the loss of Mari's protection to the caravans. This led the Babylonian king Samsu-iluna to build many strongholds up the river valley, and to establish colonies of mercenaries known as the "Kassite Houses" to protect the middle Euphrates area. Those colonies later evolved into semi-independent polities that waged a war against the Babylonian king Ammi-Saduqa and caused the trade temporarily to stop.

== Religion ==
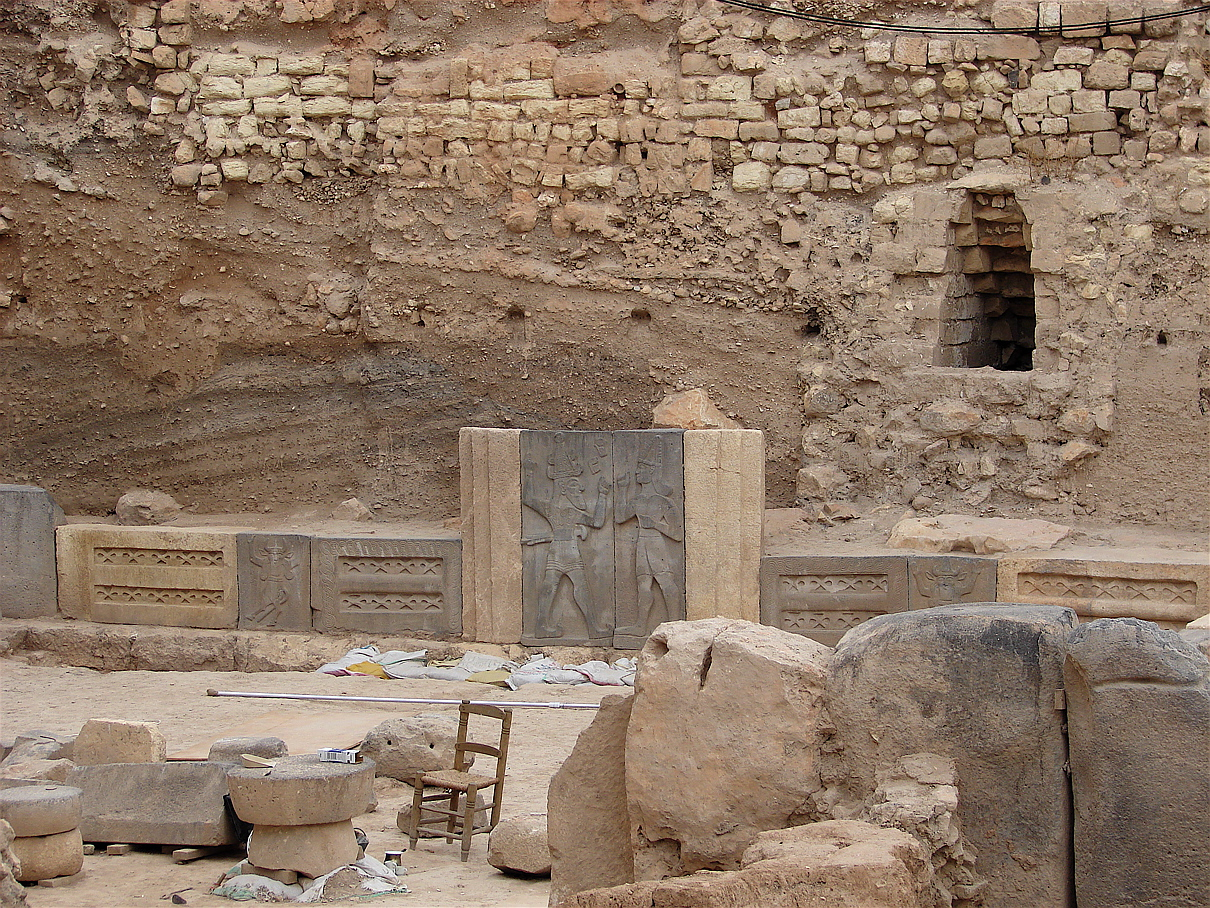
Hadad Temple, Aleppo Citadel.

The people of Yamhad practiced the Amorite religion, and mainly worshiped the Northwest Semitic deities. The most important of these were Dagon, who was considered the father of the gods, and Hadad, who was the most important deity and the head of the pantheon. The kingdom was known as the "land of Hadad", who was famous as the Storm-God of Halab beginning in the middle of the 3rd millennium BC. His main temple was located on the citadel hill in the center of the city and remained in use from the 24th century BC, until at least the 9th century BC.

The title "Beloved of Hadad" was one of the king's titles. Hadad was the kingdom's patron god, and all treaties were concluded in his name, which was also used to threaten other kingdoms, and to declare wars. As the Hurrian presence grew, so did Hurrian religious influences and some of the Hurrian deities found a place in the Yamhadite pantheon. King Abba-El I mentioned receiving the support of the Hurrian goddess Hebat in one of the Alalakh tablets (Hebat was the spouse of the Hurrian main deity Teshub, but in Abba-El I's tablet, she is associated with Hadad). Later, the Hurrians started to identify Teshub with Hadad, who became Teshub the Storm-God of Halab.

Beside the general gods, the kings had a "head god", that is, a deity who had an intimate connection for the worshiper. King Yarim-Lim I described Hadad as the god of the state, but the Mesopotamian deity Sin as the god of his head. His son Hammurabi I did likewise.

== See also ==
- Armi
- Yamhad dynasty
- List of rulers of Aleppo
