= Ammitakum =

Mesopotamian king

King of Alalakh
- Reign: c. 1700 BC
- Predecessor: Yarim-Lim
- Issue: 1 son

Ammitakum (fl. c. 1700 BC) was a king of the ancient Mesopotamian city Alalakh, and a vassal of the Great Kingdom of Yamhad.

== Reign ==
Archaeologists unearthed a large number of tablets detailing Ammitakum's reign. These documents showed that many citizens of Alalakh were indebted to him.

=== Land purchase from Irkabtum ===
Ammitakum purchased two settlements named Age and Igandan from king Irkabtum of Yamhad.

=== Arranged marriage ===
It is likely Ammitakum was succeeded by Hammurabi. Ammitakum also arranged a marriage for his son. He married his son to the daughter of the king of Ebla.

Ammitakum Yamhad dynasty
Regnal titles
| Preceded by Yarim-Lim | King of Alalakh c. 1700 BC | Succeeded by |
