= Idrimi =

15th-century BC King of Alalakh

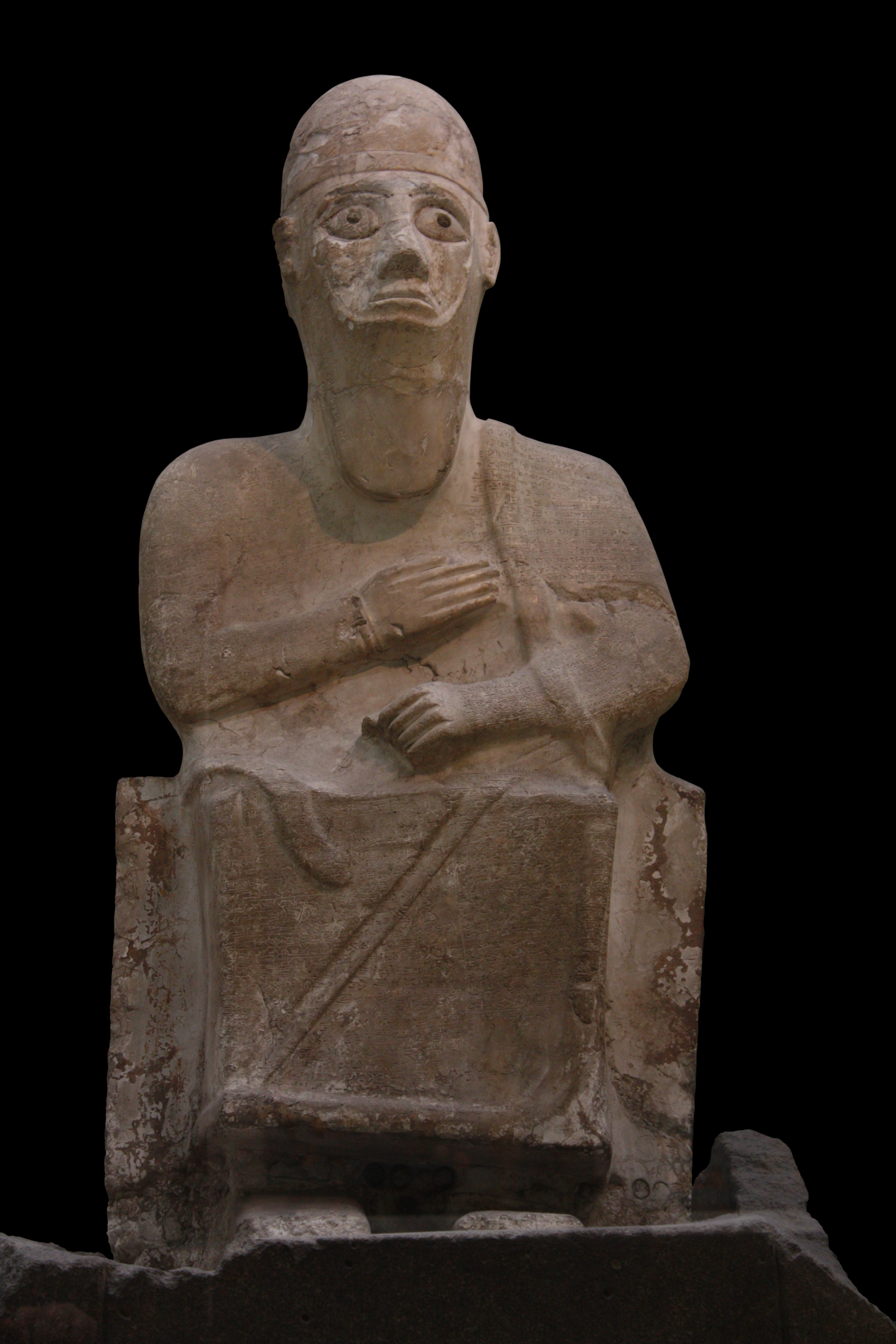
- Statue of Idrimi

King of Alalakh
- Reign: c. 1490 - c. 1465 BC
- Died: c. 1465 BC
- Issue: Niqmepa
- Father: Ilim-Ilimma I

Idrimi (meaning "It is my help"; died c. 1465 BC) was the king of Alalakh c. 1490–1465 BC, or around 1450 BC. He is known mainly from an inscription on his statue found at Alalakh by Leonard Woolley in 1939. According to that inscription, he was a son of Ilim-Ilimma I, King of Yamhad (now Aleppo), who would have been deposed by the new regional master Baratarna, King of Mitanni. Idrimi probably succeeded in gaining the throne of Alalakh with the assistance of a group known as the Habiru, founding the Kingdom of Mukish as a vassal state to Mitanni. He also invaded the Hittite territories to the north, resulting in a treaty with the country Kizzuwatna.

Jacob Lauinger considers Idrimi a historical character, King of Alalakh around 1450 BC, during the Late Bronze Age, but suggests his statue and inscriptions can be dated from around 1400 to 1350 BC and can be related to a Mesopotamian pseudo-autobiography (called narû-literature), in which kings apparently leave records of their misadventures as a lesson for future generations. Lauinger also comments that the inscriptions try to legitimize the rule of Alalakh only by acknowledging the supremacy of Mitanni, and the text(s) may have had an audience coeval to politics of that time.

== Early life ==
=== Family ===
Idrimi was one of the younger sons of Ilim-Ilimma I, King of Halab and born to [...]. On his mother's side, the maternal home was the city of Emar on the Euphrates River. He was the father of Niqmepa who may have been his succeessor him on the throne.

=== Exile in Emar ===
In the first part of Idrimi's autobiography on his statue, it is claimed that an incident had occurred in Halab and that he and his family had to flee as a result. Jack Sasson of the University of North Carolina speculated that Idrimi did not claim any relationship to Halab's rulers. He argued that Ilim-Ilimma I, Idrimi's father, was either dethroned or had unsuccessfully attempted to usurp the throne of Halab from an unknown king. Idrimi goes to Emar because of his maternal ancestral connections to the Lords of Emar. While living in Emar, he considered himself a slave.

According to Tremper Longman, lines 8b–9 of the autobiography indicate that Idrimi may have considered retaking his father's lost throne, and that he tried to involve his brothers in his cause. As his brothers declined to participate, Idrimi went to Alalakh alone but then fled to Ammiya in the land of Canaan. According to Marc Van de Mieroop, Idrimi was unhappy at Emar for being an "underling".

If the narrative is historical, there is no scholarly debate that is adequate enough to explain why Idrimi chose to live among the Habiru in Canaan, though it is psychologically clear that Idrimi got along well with the other refugees. It was because they went through a similar experience of being uprooted from their own hometowns. Another possibility by looking at Tremper Longman's theory is that Idrimi was recruiting potential allies in a greater effort to take Alalakh. It is clear from these various scholarly speculations that a political motivation may have been involved in Idrimi's desire to take back Alalakh. This motive is further indicated by author Garrett Galvin, who compared Idrimi's story to the famous Egyptian work, the Story of Sinuhe.

Idrimi was similar to Sinuhe in the sense that he was a high-class refugee looking back to his roots and finding an opportunity to take back his throne while being fueled by humiliation and anger towards his political enemies. Galvin also argued that Idrimi's attitude of being from a higher social class overcame the hardships he had as a refugee.

== Reign ==
Idrimi was a descendant from the Great Kings of Yamhad centered on Ḫalap (Aleppo). Now, Idrimi had established himself as a petty king in the Kingdom of Mukiš with its capital at Alalakh (Level IV).

Alalakh Level IV refers to a significant stratum at the Late Bronze Age archaeological site of Tell Atchana, dating to the mid-15th century BCE, a period under Mitanni rule where the famous palace and its archives, including the Idrimi inscription. The local kings built up urban center with strong administration and international connections.

=== Rise to Kingship in Alalakh ===
After seven years living among the Habiru in Canaan, seeking an opportunity to take back his throne, Idrimi found his chance. Edward Greenstein and David Marcus' translation of the inscription on lines 29–34 revealed that following the storm-god Teshub's advice in a dream, Idrimi,

"made ships and had auxiliary troops board them and proceeded via the sea to Mukishe (Mukish),"

and he adds that,

"Now, when my country heard of me, they brought me large cattle and small cattle, and in one day, in unison, the countries of Ni'i (Niya)..., Mukishe (Mukish), and my own city Alalah (Alalakh) became reconciled with me...they concluded a treaty and established them truly as my allies."

This newfound alliance with local rulers, created by cattle exchanges, was just the beginning of the gradual restoration of Idrimi's royal status as the king of Alalakh.

Edward Greenstein's and David Marcus's translation of the inscription on lines 42–51 revealed that despite Barattarna's hostility to Idrimi while he was in exile in Canaan, he actually respected Idrimi's coalition, maybe submitting to Idrimi out of fear that his social outcast army could overthrow him. Idrimi said that King Barattarna,

"... for seven years ... was hostile to me. I sent Anwanda to Barattarna, the mighty king, the king of the Hurrian warriors, and told him of the treaties of my ancestors...and that our actions were pleasing to the former kings of the Hurrian warriors for they had made a binding agreement."

"The mighty king heard of the treaties of our predecessors and the agreement made between them and...read to him the words of the treaty in detail. So on account of our treaty terms he received my tribute...I...restored to him a lost estate. I swore to him a binding oath as a loyal vassal."

Here, possibly influenced by the nature of Hittite oaths, Idrimi swore loyalty to Barattarna after seven years despite him overthrowing his father on the throne in Aleppo. He made his request to the throne peacefully by restoring Barattarna's estate and swore him an ultimate Hurrian loyalty oath, which was the first step to Idrimi regaining his power again.

The inscription in lines 42–51 of Greenstein and Marcus's translation described Idrimi's capture of Alalakh as a peaceful effort to appease Barattarna with tributes of restoring his estate and swearing a loyalty oath unto him rather than using warfare to capture the city. Marc Van de Mieroop mentioned that Idrimi "captured" Alalakh, implying a warfare approach that the inscription does not describe.

Author Paul Collins described Idrimi's maneuver as,

"... a greeting-present, the traditional form of establishing and maintaining friendly relations between rulers, even those of different rank, and reminded him (Barattarna) of earlier oaths sworn between the kings of Halab (Aleppo) and the kings of Mitanni."

Also, Collins mentioned that Barattarna had accepted Idrimi's tribute to him as a loyal vassal ruler. He only allowed Idrimi limited independence of making his own military and diplomatic decisions just as long as it didn't interfere with Mitanni's overall policy. This further allowed Idrimi to set his sights on his diplomatic and military aims in Kizzuwatna and act as an independent ruler. Idrimi's "capture" of Alalakh was evidenced in his statue inscription and Collins' analysis as a peaceful movement rather than a military movement.

=== The rule of Idrimi in Alalakh ===
After Idrimi's success in establishing a peaceful agreement with King Barattarna of Mitanni sometime around 1490 BC, most of his actions as king are vaguely written and are limited to only smaller sources. Tablets 1 and 2 at the British Museum are great primary sources about Idrimi's actions during his rule, but it's not enough to just look at those two tablets as a whole description of Idrimi's rule. Strong scholarly consensus argued by ancient Syro-Palestine scholars Dominique Collon and Gary Oller also suggested that Idrimi led cross-border raids into Hittite territory during his rule. According to Collon, he raided Hittite territory and used the booty from that raid to build his massive palace.

Gary Oller, in his 1977 dissertation, further confirmed Collon's statement by reaffirming Idrimi's statement in lines 64-77 of his statue inscription that he raided seven cities somewhere near the city of Gaziantep in modern-day Turkey.

According to Edward Greenstein and David Marcus' translation of Idrimi's statue inscription,

"Then I took troops and attacked Hatti-land. As for the seven cities under their protection...these I destroyed. Hatti-land did not assemble and did not march against me, so I did what I wanted. I took captives from them and took their property, valuables, and possessions and distributed them to my auxiliaries, kinsmen, and friends. Together with them I took booty."

It is possible that Idrimi may have taken slaves along with other trade goods in his raids on the seven Hittite towns as booty to restore his own power.

Gary Oller gave some validity to the existence of the cities sacked in Idrimi's raid by mentioning two of the seven Hatti cities of Hassuwa (Khashshum) and Zaruna in Hattusili I's annals from his reign in c. 1580–1556 BC. The annals mentioned that Hattusili I destroyed Zaruna in his fifth campaign and defeated a coalition of Hassuwa and Halab, cities also mentioned by Idrimi in his statue inscription.

Lines 77-78 from Greenstein's and Marcus's translation of the statue inscription confirmed Collon's argument of what Idrimi did with his booty:

"Then I returned to Mukishe (Mukish) and entered my capital Alalah (Alalakh). With the captives, goods, and property, and possessions which I brought down from Hatti, I had a palace built."

The inscription from lines 78-86 of that same translation states,

"I made my regime like the regime of kings. I made my brothers like royal brothers, my sons like their sons and my relatives their relatives. The inhabitants who were in my land I made to dwell securely, and even those who did not have a dwelling I settled. Then I organized my land, and made my cities like they were before. Just as our ancestors had established regular rites for the gods of Alaklah, and just as our forefathers had performed sacrifices, I constantly performed them. These things I did, and I entrusted them to my son Adad-niari."

It is possible according to the statue text that Idrimi would have used his "spoils of war" from the seven Hittite towns, especially any valuable items, to help fund the rebuilding of his cities. It is very likely that, based on his coalition he had when he took over Alalakh as vassal king, Mukish and other cities in the coalition became a part of Alalakh's vassal kingdom. As a "gratefulness" gift for Idrimi, they would offer tribute to him for him to rebuild their cities for them, which is mentioned in the royal seal of Idrimi. It is also possible that he supported the gods of Emar and the cults of the storm-god Teshub if one looks at the brief mentions of those gods in his statue inscriptions during the early phases of his life.

On the other hand, Tremper Longman III considers all this narrative passages in Idrimi's statue as having the same "basic threefold structure that characterizes all Akkadian fictional autobiography," and that,

"... what is debated is whether the text is 'true' autobiography, which may be used uncritically as a source to reconstruct Syrian history in the fifteenth century B.C., or fictional autobiography...written after Idrimi had died...With these difficulties in mind, attention may be focused on the literary nature of the Idrimi inscription. Rather than being concerned with narrating historical facts, the author of the inscription employed many traditional folkloristic motifs in order to tell the story of Idrimi."

=== Debate on Sharruwa the scribe and his blessing of the statue ===
In the final parts of the statue inscription, Idrimi commissioned the scribe Sharruwa to write his statue inscription, invoking major blessings for those who respect his statues and cursings by the gods to anyone who would defile his statue. Jack M. Sasson of the University of North Carolina contended that Sharruwa wrote the inscription for selfish reasons to bolster his national pride. This was indicated by the fact that Idrimi's statue was not found in Level 4 in Woolley's time, but on Level 1B (1250–1200 BC). Dominique Collon refuted his arguments by saying that many of the documents associated with Idrimi in the Level 4 Alalakh palace archives discovered by Woolley were associated with his reign in 1490–1460 BC, therefore giving some validity to Sharruwa's statements.

=== Idrimi's rule in tablet #1: The royal seal of Idrimi ===
This tablet or "seal" was one of only two recorded sources of Idrimi from the British Museum. The tablet was Idrimi's royal seal, which contained his accounts of goodwill gifts of silver and other forms of tribute like cattle from Mukish and Zelki and other nearby cities, possibly demonstrating a tribute system among his allied city-states dating back to his alliance with them during his exile. His seal represented his act of piety towards the Shutu people and to those who "had no settled abode," to show his generosity as a king and former Habiru refugee as he rebuilt his cities.

It is clear from the inscriptions on the seal that Idrimi ruled within Level IV in the mid to late Bronze Age with piety and wise administration and that it was subsequently used by his son and successor Niqmepa as his royal seal as a replica of his own royal seal. If Niqmepa used his father's royal seal for his own royal seal, which contained the names of his predecessors, "Abbaban, Sararan, Naraam", it is implied that Idrimi would have those same names on his royal seal, indicating his need for legitimacy from his previous Hurrian rulers, who made oaths to legitimize their claims to the throne according to his statue inscription.

Royal seals were frequently used in the Hittite Empire and Hurrian regions in northern Syria to demonstrate the king's power in Idrimi's time. They were made up of a material of glass and silica called faience. The faience was heated at a lower temperature so that the surface could have a glazed appearance, allowing them to be easily carved and cheaply produced. The seal could suggest a possible theory that despite the Hittites being a political rival to Idrimi, he adapted the Hittite-style royal seal along with Hittite-style oaths of loyalty he made to Parshatatar and Pilliya. Oller theorized that Idrimi's predecessors in his royal seal were Halabian rulers of the 16th century BC of an independent Halab (Aleppo) prior to Mitanni's rise to power, though their relationship with Idrimi has yet to be determined by other scholars. Oller also proposed a theory that Idrimi's predecessors ruled Yamhad when Alalakh was a part of Yamhad's territory, though that theory has not been confirmed by other scholars.

=== Treaty between Idrimi and Pilliya of Kizzuwatna ===
In Idrimi tablet 2 from several treaty texts revealed that Idrimi had somehow exchanged other slaves or fugitives with Pilliya of Kizzuwatna, which made sense considering that both Idrimi and Pilliya were vassal kings to Barattarna.

According to Donald L. Magetti, the treaty was partly influenced by the swearing of oaths in the Hittite Empire, but only within the context of swearing oaths of loyalty with one another as leaders, saying in lines 3-5, they "took an oath by the gods and made this treaty". He argued that lines 40-43 of the treaty required that Barattarna, the Hittite king of Mitanni, approved the treaty before it could be effective and that fugitives or slaves could be exchanged between Idrimi and Pilliya only after the king approved the agreement.

The treaty was concluded by Idrimi and Pilliya following Idrimi's raids into Hittite territory. This may somewhat validate line 77 of Greenstein's and Marcus's translation of Idrimi's statue inscription, "Together with them I took (booty)," suggesting that Idrimi led raids into Kizzuwatna and wanted to end them in order to gain Pilliya's favor against bigger enemies like the Hittites as a buffer state. This favor was to be gained by a runaway slave clause within the treaty allowing ordinary citizens to retrieve runaway slaves for rewards of five-hundred copper shekels for a man and one thousand shekels for a woman. A slave owner could also enter into Kizzuwatna and Alalakh to retrieve their runaway slaves for no reward.

== Sources of Idrimi ==
All three sources were discovered by British archaeologist Leonard Woolley within the Level IV (Late Bronze Age in the mid-15th century BC) archives of the Alalakh palace and come from his collection at the British Museum.

=== Statue text ===
The inscription bears 104 lines "written in a provincial dialect of Akkadian," and records Idrimi's autobiographical vicissitudes on his statue's base found within a pit of a Level IB temple at the site of Tell Atchana (Alalakh). Jacob Lauinger dates the inscription around 1400–1350 BC, in Level III (/II) excavated by Woolley, or Period 3, according to K. Aslihan Yener's excavations. The first part of the inscription revealed Idrimi's circumstances fleeing from Aleppo. The translated inscription, according to author Amélie Kuhrt, stated:

"I am Idrimi, the son of Ilimilimma, servant of Teshub, Hepat, and Shaushga, the lady of Alalakh, my mistress. In Aleppo, in the house of my fathers, a crime had occurred and we fled. The Lords of Emar were descended from the sisters of my mother, so we settled in Emar. My brothers, who were older than me, also lived with me..."

After his family had been forced to flee to Emar, with his mother's people, he realized that he would not wield real power in Emar, saying:

"...but he that is with the people of Emar, is a slave."

As a result, he left his family and brothers, took his horse, chariot, and squire, went into the desert, and joined the "Hapiru people" in "Ammija (Amiya) in the land of Canaan", where other refugees from Aleppo (the people from Halab, people from the land of Mukish [dominated by Alalakh], people from the land of Nihi [near the Orontes River in Syria], and people of Nuhašše, also known as Ama'e), recognized him as the "son of their overlord" and "gathered around him."

The second part of the inscription revealed major events in Idrimi's life including a campaign in Hurrian territory to reclaim Alalakh. After living among the Habiru (Hapiru) for seven years, he led his new friends and Habiru allies in a successful attack by sea on Alalakh, where he became king. The inscription further stated:

"In the seventh year, Teshub turned towards me. As a result, I built ships. The x-soldiers I caused to enter the ships...when my country heard of me, cattle and sheep were brought before me. In a single day...Nihi...Amae...the country of Mukish and Alalah, turned towards me like one man. My brothers heard of this and came to me. My brothers and I swore mutual alliance; I placed my brothers under my protection."

Idrimi built ships and likely gathered soldiers from Mukish, Amae, Nihi, and Alakah, which was enough to impress his own brothers to join him in reclaiming Alalakh.

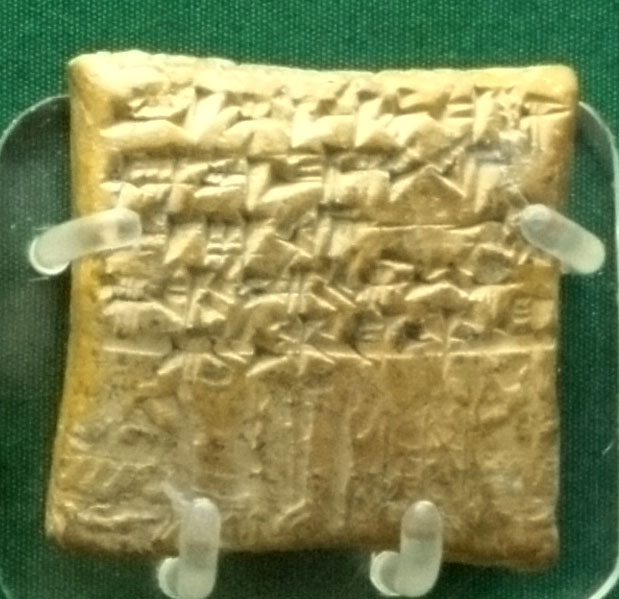
Tablet with the seal of King Idrimi.

The inscription continues by relating that he somehow gained the trust of Barattarna, who recognized Idrimi's oath of alliance with his brothers and placed himself within the alliance. A final section requested a blessing of the statue from Sharruwa, the statue's scribe, and cursed those who would deface his statue.

However, there is a strong danger of using the statue's text as a single historical source. Just like the inscriptions of Ramesses II's poetic prose of the Battle of Kadesh, the statue of Idrimi's text suggested that Idrimi's real campaigns were probably exaggerated to make himself legitimate. Many scholars studying the inscription have suggested it to be a form of pseudo-history, possibly based on "exaggerations" of his campaigns, or a moralizing story, composed 50–100 years after Idrimi's lifetime.

=== Idrimi tablet 1 ===
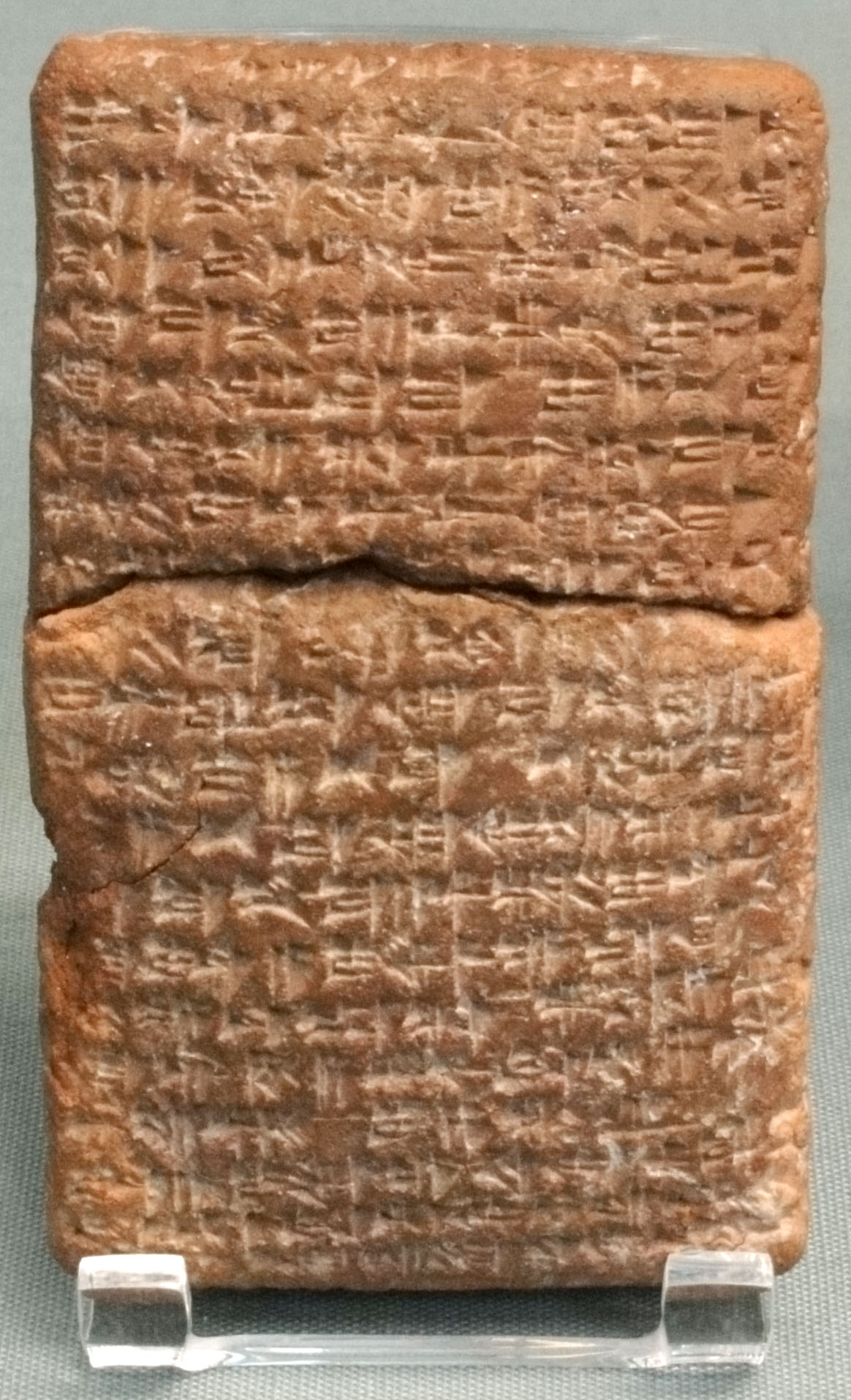
A slave exchange treaty between Idrimi and Pilliya of Kizzuwatna.

This tablet (shown left) was excavated by Leonard Woolley between 1936 and 1949 at Tell Atchana (Alalakh) in northern Syria. It dates back to c. 1500–1450 BC. The tablet contained Idrimi's royal seal and revealed an agreement that Idrimi made for the annual dues of gold and sheep to be paid to him or to his successor, his son Niqmepa, who often used his own father's seal. The seal's inscription also read: "Idrimi, servant of the God Adad" (the local storm-god in Alalakh). The tablet suggested that Idrimi not only wielded absolute power in Alalakh, but it also suggested that Idrimi had exercised some independence through his own self-deification.

=== Idrimi tablet 2 ===
This tablet (shown right) was excavated at Tell Atchana in northern Syria between 1936 and 1949 and dates back to c. 1480 BC. It was a treaty that Idrimi made with another vassal ruler to Mitanni, Pilliya of Kizzuwatna. The treaty was for fugitives exchanges between Idrimi and Pilliya.

== Comparisons to Biblical characters ==
=== Number Seven ===
Assyriologist Adolf Oppenheim saw parallels between Idrimi and King David of Judah. Idrimi stayed for seven years among Hapiru warriors. After seven years, the god Addu or Teshub became favorable to him and he started building ships. The king Barattarna was hostile to him for seven years. In the seventh year Idrimi launched negotiations with Barattarna. He also gathered spoils from seven Hittite cities and built his own palace. David had a similar pattern with the number seven too. He was the youngest of seven sons of Jesse. He stayed seven years in Hebron before conquering a Jebusite fortress outside of Jerusalem and renaming it the "City of David." He also offered the elders of Judah gifts from spoils won during the raid, while Idrimi raided the seven Hittite towns and gave those spoils to his allies as mentioned in his inscription.

=== Style of literature ===
Oppenheim also commented on similar stories of Joseph with his brothers, as those of David, claiming Idrimi's narrative is different from the content and style of Mesopotamian literature, but Jacob Lauinger considers it as part of a Mesopotamian pseudo-autobiography (called narû-literature).

For Edward Greenstein, the story of Idrimi was similar to the Biblical stories of Jacob, Joseph, Moses, Jephthah, and Nehemiah. All five Biblical figures and Idrimi were exiles in their younger days, undertook journeys to discover the divine will, and attributed their success in maintaining the well-being of their people to divine intervention. Christopher Woods (2020) comments on parallels, along with these five characters, to David and the Egyptian story of Sinuhe.
