= Alalakh =

Archaeological site in Reyhanlı, Hatay, Turkey

- Alalaḫ (Arabic)
- Tell Atchana
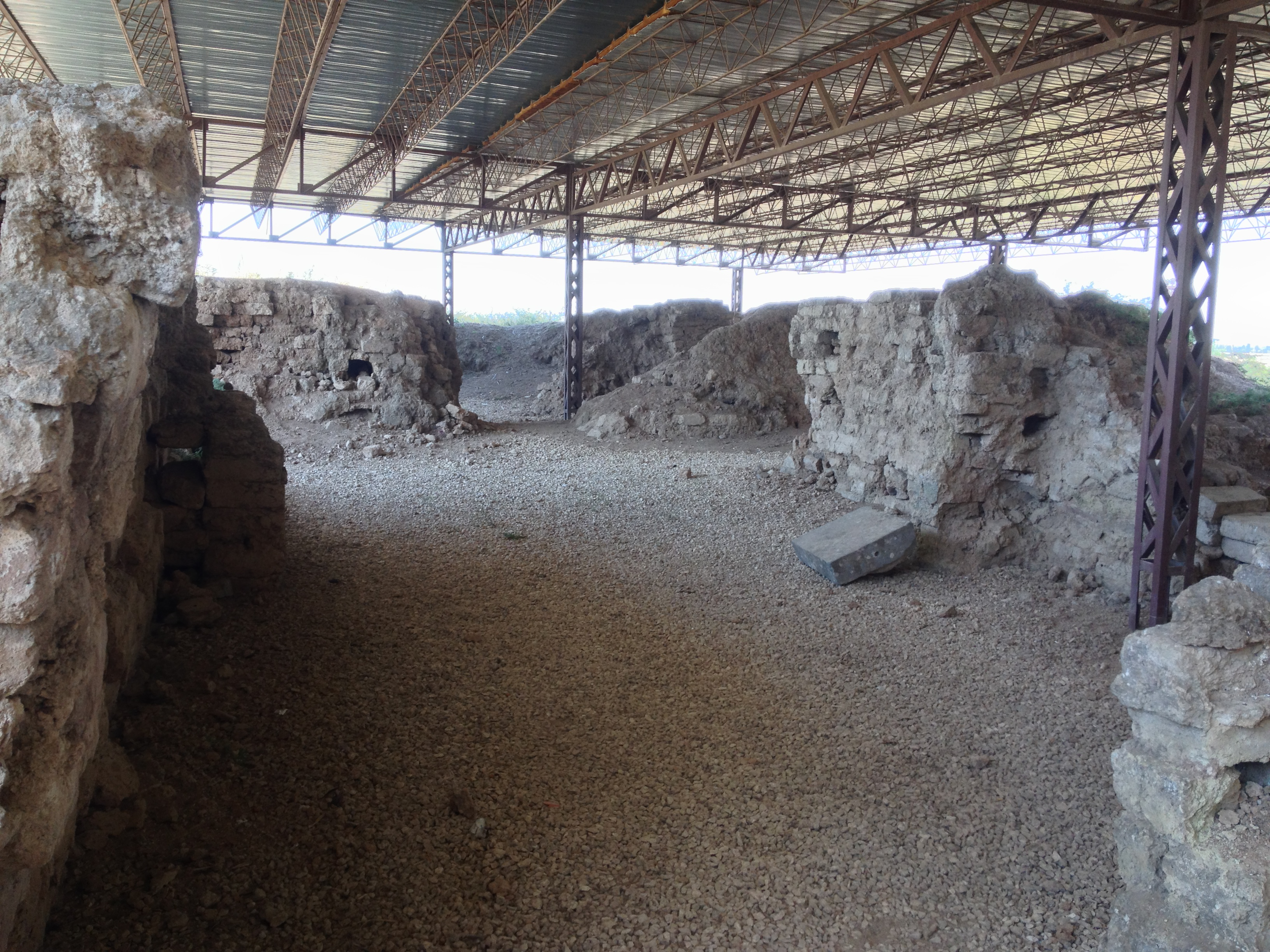
- Archaeological site of Alalakh (Tell Açana)

- Location within Turkey
- 36°14′16″N 36°23′05″E
- Type: Settlement
- Location: Hatay Province, Turkey
- Region: Levant

History
- Built: c. 2200 BC
- Abandoned: c. 600 BC

Site notes
- Excavation dates: 1937–1939, 1946–1949, 2003-2004
- Condition: In ruins

Alalakh (Tell Atchana; Hittite: Alalaḫ) is an ancient archaeological site approximately 20 kilometres (12 mi) northeast of Antakya (historic Antioch) in what is now Turkey's Hatay Province. It flourished as an urban settlement in the Middle and Late Bronze Age, c. 2000–1200 BC. The city contained palaces, temples, private houses and fortifications. The remains of Alalakh have formed an extensive mound covering around 22 hectares. In the Late Bronze Age, Alalakh was the capital of the local kingdom of Mukiš.

The first palace was built around 2000 BC, and likely destroyed in the 12th century BC. The site was thought to have never been reoccupied after that, but archaeologist Timothy Harrison showed, in a (2022) lecture's graphic, it was inhabited also in Amuq Phases N-O, Iron Age, c. 1200–600 BC.

== Location ==
It is located in Amik Valley, about 2 kilometres (1.2 mi) from the modern Syria–Turkey border. Lake Amik was an ancient lake in this area.

Human settlements in Amik Valley date back to the Neolithic period as early as 6000 BC. Many other ancient archaeological sites are located in this area, such as Tell Tayinat, which was recently excavated. Tell Atchana is located only about 700m southeast of Tell Tayinat within the flood plain of the Orontes River, where the river enters the Amuq Plain. Chatal Huyuk (Amuq) is another major site that is located in the area.

== History ==
Treaty clay tablet
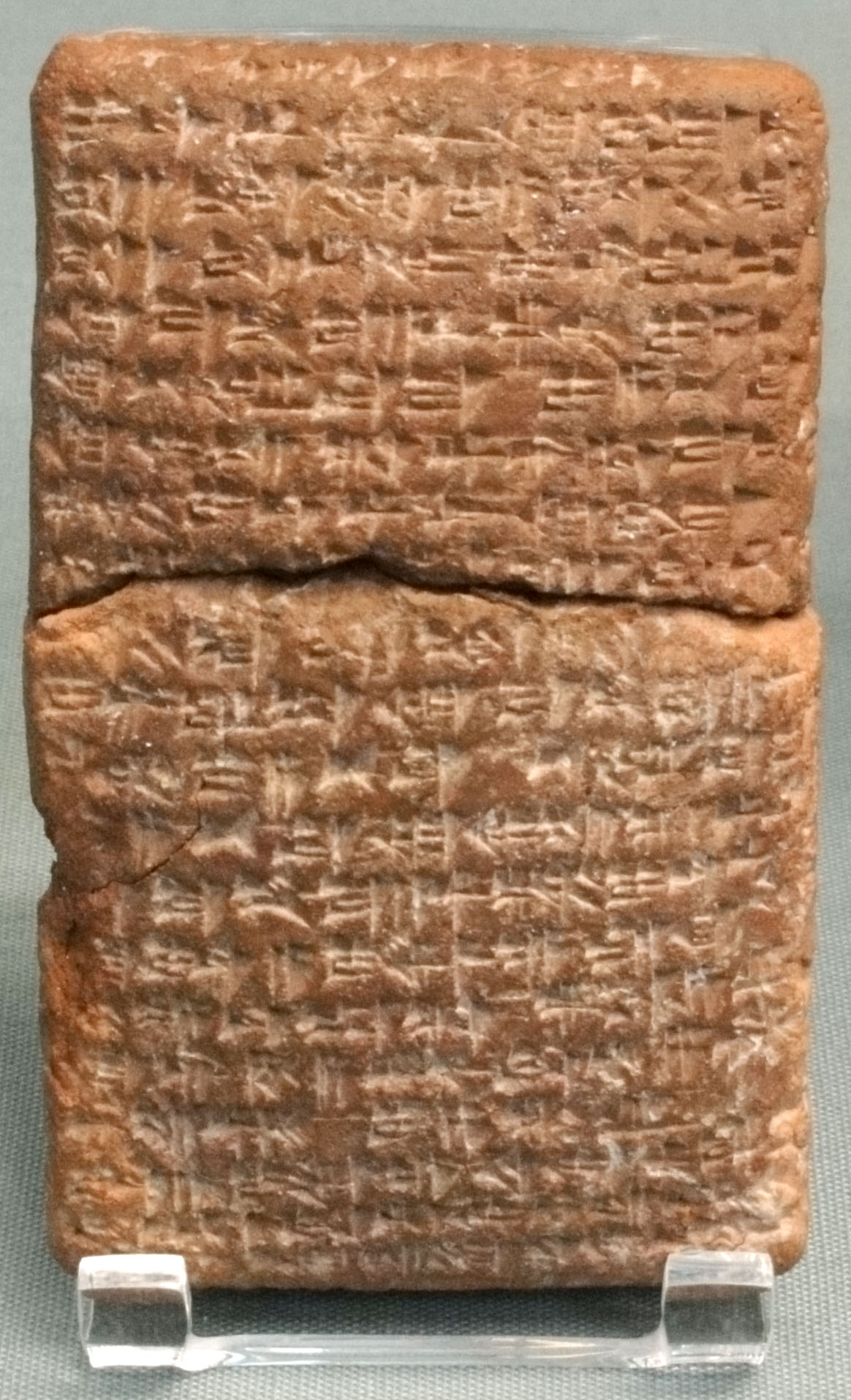
- Fugitive slave treaty between Idrimi of Alalakh (now Tell Atchana) and Pillia of Kizzuwatna (now Cilicia)
- Size: Length: 12 cm (4.7 in); Width: 6.4 cm (2.5 in)
- Writing: cuneiform
- Created: c. 1480 BC
- Present location: Room 54, British Museum, London
- Identification: 131447

Alalakh was founded by the Amorites (in the territory of present-day Turkey) during the early Middle Bronze Age in the late 3rd millennium BC. The first palace was built c. 2000 BC, contemporary with the Third Dynasty of Ur.

Chronology of Alalakh, related to other sites in the Amuq Lake region, is as follows:

Archaeological Era	Amuq Phases	Date BC
Terminal Early Bronze Age	Late J	2050-2000
Middle and Late Bronze Ages	K, L, M	2000-1150
Iron Age I	N	1150-900
Iron Age II	O (Early-Middle.)	900-738

=== Middle Bronze Age ===
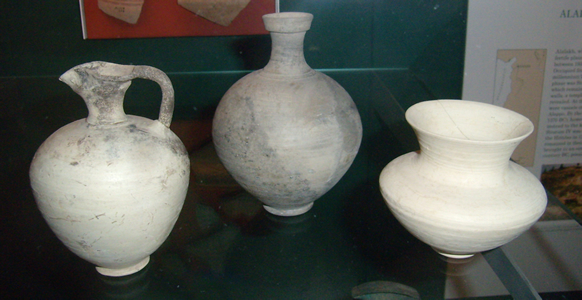
Three jars from Alalakh, Level VII, British Museum

According to recent excavations led by archaeologists K. A. Yener and Murat Akar, the whole Middle Bronze Age in Alalakh lasted c. 2000-1650 BC, as part of a re-urbanization period in Anatolia as well as in the Near East and Levant.

Middle Bronze Age is divided in two periods: Middle Bronze Age I (c. 2000-1800 BC), and Middle Bronze Age II (c. 1800-1600 BC).

==== Alalakh VIII ====
In the early Middle Bronze IIA (c. 1820-1750 BCE), in Yener's Period 8 (Woolley's level VIII (Note: In this article, excavated levels are numbered with "Alalakh VIII" being the lowest oldest and deepest, and Alalakh II being the newest studied, top layer. Each layer corresponds to a different civilizational period.)), in which a palace and a temple, as well as intramural burials, were found. At the time Alalakh was a vassal of the Kingdom of Yamhad.

The written history of the site may begin under the name Alakhtum, with tablets from Mari in the 18th century BC, when the city was part of the kingdom of Yamhad (modern Aleppo). A dossier of tablets records that King Sumu-Epuh (c. 1810-1780 BCE) sold the territory of Alakhtum to his son-in-law Zimri-Lim, king of Mari, retaining for himself overlordship. After the fall of Mari in 1765 BC, Alalakh seems to have come under the direct rule of Yamhad again.

==== Alalakh VII ====
In the late MB IIA (c. 1750-1630 BCE), in Period 7 (Level VII), was still a vassalage of Yamhad, and was handed over to the Yarim-Lim Dynasty. There was a later palace, an archive, some temples, a city wall, a tripartite gate, households, workshops, extramural and intramural burials were excavated. In the palace of Level VII, during 2015-2019 excavations, more than 70 wall painting fragments were found and radiocarbon-dated to c. 1780-1680 BC.

King Abba-El I of Aleppo (c. 1750 BC) bestowed the city upon his brother Yarim-Lim of Alalakh, to replace the city of Irridu. Abba-El had destroyed the latter after it revolted against Yarim-Lim. In the 18th to 17th centuries period transition, Alalakh was under the reign of Yarim-Lim, and was the capital of the city-state of Mukiš and vassal to Yamhad, centered in modern Aleppo.

Destruction. Under the hegemony of Aleppo, a dynasty of Yarim-Lim's descendants was founded; it lasted to the second half of 17th century BC. At that time Alalakh was destroyed, possibly by Hittite king Hattusili I, in the second year of his campaigns. As per middle chronology and publications by archaeologist K. A. Yener, destruction of Alalakh can be located as a "Fire and Conflagration" around 1650 BC. A recent Yener's paper considers Palace's Level VII destruction by Hattusili I to have taken place in his second year, in 1628 BC.

=== Late Bronze Age ===
Late Bronze Age is divided in two periods: Late Bronze Age I (c. 1600-1400 BC), and Late Bronze Age II (c. 1400-1200/1190 BC). The former was characterized by being a Mittani vassal territory, and the latter by Hittite occupation.

==== Alalakh V ====
Alalakh V represents an intermediate period before the area came under the control of Idrimi in the Mitanni period.

==== Alalakh IV ====
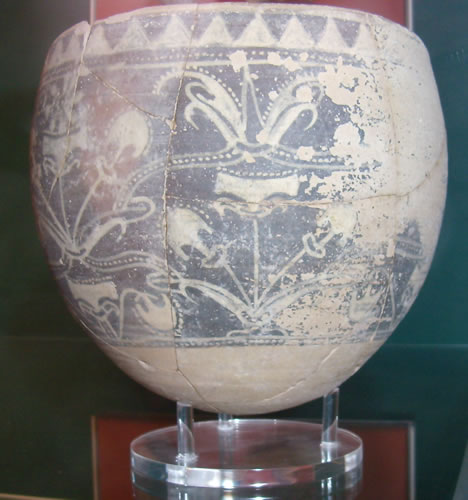
Atchana-Nuzi ware bowl found in Alalakh. From Levels III-II, Late Bronze Age, circa 1370-1270 BC. According to the excavator L. Woolley, this represents a locally produced variant of Nuzi ware, first recognized at the site of Nuzi in Iraq. Characteristic of the Atchana ware are the floral designs, not found in the Nuzi ware. British Museum.

After a hiatus of less than a century, written records for Alalakh resume. At this time, it was again the seat of a local dynasty. Most of the information about the founding of this dynasty comes from a statue inscribed with what seems to be an autobiography of the dynasty's founding king, Idrimi. According to his inscription, in the 15th century BC, Idrimi, son of the king of Yamhad, may have fled his city for Emar, traveled to Alalakh, gained control of the city, and been recognized as a vassal by Barattarna. The inscription records Idrimi's vicissitudes: after his family had been forced to flee to Emar, he left them and joined the "Hapiru people" in "Ammija in the land of Canaan." The Hapiru recognized him as the "son of their overlord" and "gathered around him"; after living among them for seven years, he led his Habiru warriors in a successful attack by sea on Alalakh, where he became king. The statue mentions an heir, Addu-nirari, who is otherwise not attested.

However, according to the archaeological site report, this statue was discovered in a level of occupation dating several centuries after the time that Idrimi lived. But recently, archaeologist Jacob Lauinger considers the statue and inscription can be dated to Woolley's Level III (/II), c. 1400-1350 BC, around 50 to 100 years after Idrimi's lifetime. There has been much scholarly debate as to its historicity. Archaeologically-dated tablets recount that Idrimi's son Niqmepuh was contemporaneous with the Mitanni king Saushtatar. This seems to support the inscription on the statue claiming that Idrimi was contemporaneous with Barattarna, Saushtatar's predecessor.

The socio-economic history of Alalakh during the reign of Idrimi's son and grandson, Niqmepuh and Ilim-Ilimma I, is well documented by tablets excavated from the site. Idrimi is referred to rarely in these tablets.

In the mid-14th century BC, the Hittite Suppiluliuma I defeated king Tushratta of Mitanni and assumed control of northern Syria, then including Alalakh, which he incorporated into the Hittite Empire. A tablet records his grant of much of Mukish's land (that is, Alalakh's) to Ugarit, after the king of Ugarit alerted the Hittite king to a revolt by the kingdoms of Mukish, Nuhassa, and Niye.

==== Alalakh III and II ====
During the period of 1350 BC, Alalakh was incorporated into the Hittite Empire. Nevertheless, recent interpretations of this period by archaeologists indicate that, following the destructions of Level IV, the Alalakh castle complex was successively rebuilt three times. So Alalakh may have continued functioning as a capital city.

According to Eric Cline, the city was largely abandoned by 1300 BC. A small Hittite post was known to be there during the reign of Ammištamru (II) of Ugarit, who ruled c. 1260-1235. The Kingdom of Mukish was no more. But according to D'Alfonso (2007), there were two major phases in the Hittite administration of their new northern Syrian territories. The first one dates to the reign of Mursili II. Apparently, "one feature of this phase was the prominent role of the court of Aleppo as bench for the Syrian legal cases." The second was a mature phase that started around 1270 BC after some period of uncertainty. During this phase, the main court of jurisdiction had shifted from Aleppo to Karkemis, which then seems to have acquired even greater powers.

During the 14th and 13th centuries BC, great quantities of Mycenaean pottery had arrived to Syria-Palestine, a lot of it from Cyprus. Alalakh was the northernmost location where this Mycenaean IIIA:2-III:B pottery is found, along with Ugarit. Significant quantities of this pottery have been discovered in Alalakh.

- CTH 136 Treaty of Šuppiluliuma I with Mukiš

The Hittite tablet CTH 136, also known as KBo 13.55, is a fragmentary text that may represent a treaty of emperor Šuppiluliuma I with Mukiš. This view is favoured by Elena Devecchi. She relates this text to the conquests that Suppiluliuma made in Syria as a result of his "one-year campaign".

- CTH 64 Edict of Muršili II concerning the border between Ugarit and Mukiš

Elena Devecchi interprets this text as a legal document or a judicial verdict.

=== Iron Age ===
The site was reoccupied in Iron Age (c. 1200-600 BC), but the port of Al Mina took its place during this period.

== Archaeology ==
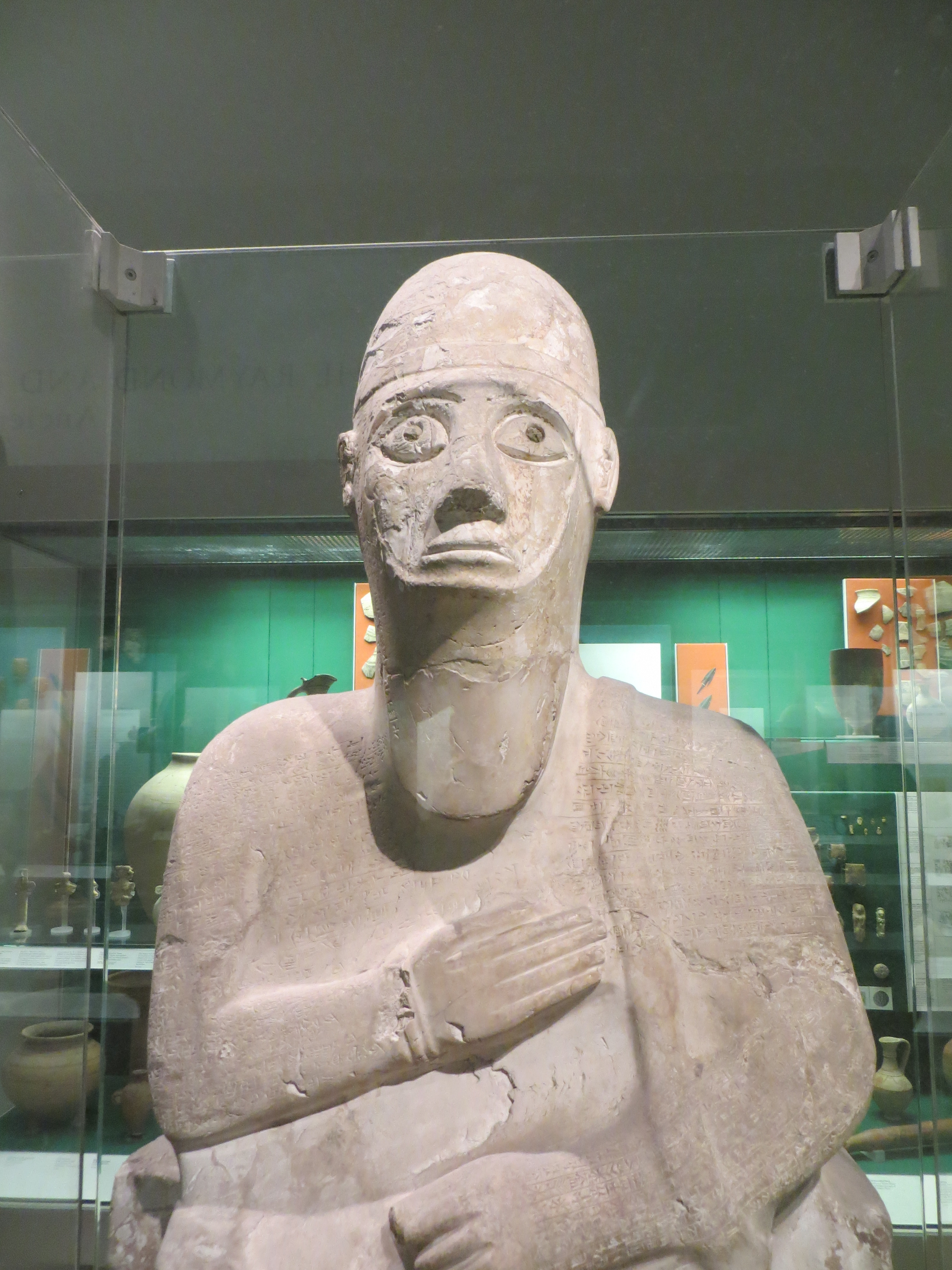
Statue of Idrimi in the British Museum

Tell Atchana was excavated by the British archaeologist Sir Leonard Woolley in the years 1937–1939 and 1946–1949. He was assisted by epigrapher Sidney Smith. His team discovered palaces, temples, private houses and fortification walls, in 17 archaeological levels, reaching from late Early Bronze Age (Level XVII, c. 2200–2000 BC) to Late Bronze Age (Level 0, 13th century BC). Among their finds was the inscribed statue of Idrimi, a king of Alalakh c. early 15th century BC. The foreman on the site, working with Woolley, was the Syrian Sheikh Hammoudi ibn Ibrahim.

After several years' surveys beginning in 1995, the University of Chicago team had its first full season of excavation in 2003 directed by K. Aslihan Yener. In 2004, the team had a short excavation and study season in order to process finds. In 2006, the project changed sponsorship and resumed excavations directed by K. Aslihan Yener under the Turkish Ministry of Culture and Tourism and Mustafa Kemal University in Antakya.

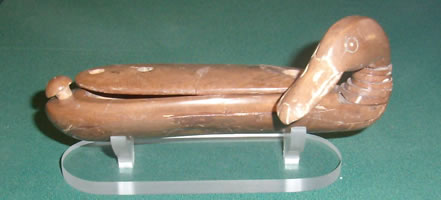
Cosmetics box found in the palace of Alalakh, Level IV, British Museum

About 500 cuneiform tablets were retrieved at Level VII, (Middle Bronze Age) and Level IV (Late Bronze Age). The inscribed statue of Idrimi, a king of Alalakh c. early 15th century BC, has provided a unique autobiography of Idrimi's youth, his rise to power, and his military and other successes. The statue is now held in the British Museum. Akkadian texts from Alalakh primarily consist of juridical tablets, which record the ruling family's control over land and the income that followed, and administrative documents, which record the flow of commodities in and out of the palace. In addition, there are a few word lists, astrological omens and conjurations.

Many examples of Nuzi ware, a high quality ceramics associated with the Mitanni period, have been discovered in Alalakh. This type of ceramics, as found at Alalakh/Atchana, is sometimes described as Atchana ware, or as Atchana-Nuzi ware.

== Goddess Kubaba ==
According to Manfred Hutter, the Amik Valley, corresponding to the ancient state of Mukish, and especially Alalakh, was the area where the Syrian and Anatolian goddess Kubaba was originally worshiped. She is generally seen as a benevolent goddess of justice. According to this theory, her worship then spread from Alalakh to Carchemish and Anatolia at large.

== Genetics ==
According to ancient DNA analyses conducted by Skourtanioti et al. (2020) on 28 human remains from Tell Atchana belonging to the Middle and Late Bronze Age period (2006-1303 cal BC), the inhabitants of Alalakh were a mixture of Chalcolithic Levantines and Mesopotamians, and were genetically similar to contemporaneous Levantines from Ebla and Sidon. Out of twelve males, six carried haplogroup J1a2a1a2-P58, two carried J2a1a1a2b2a-Z1847, and four carried J2b2-Z2454, H2-P96, L2-L595 and T1a1-CTS11451 each. Seven more male individuals were analyzed by Ingman et al. (2021): three males carried J2a1a1a2, while four males carried J1a2a1a, T1a1a, E1b1b-CTS3346 and L1b-M349 each.

== See also ==
- Cities of the ancient Near East
- Short chronology timeline
