= Mankisum =

Mankisum (Ma-an-ki-si^{ki}) was an Old Babylonian period city in the ancient Near East which is still unlocated. It was a pivotal location in the power struggles between Shamshi-Adad I of Ekallatum, Mari, Babylon, Eshnunna, and Elam due to its location at a central ford across the Tigris river. Its history is known for only about two centuries Sîn-abušu, a ruler of Nērebtum (thought to be Tell Ishchali), had a year name "Year in which Sîn-abušu the king gave his daughter to (the ruler of) Mankisum".

== History ==
When first known the city was under the control of Shamshi-Adad I (c. 1813–1776 BC) of the Kingdom of Upper Mesopotamia. In a letter from his son Ishme-Dagan of Ekallatum found at Mari:

"Speak to Yasmah-Addu, thus says Ishme-Dagan your brother. I wrote to you before to say that I had gone to Karana to help Samu-Addu. The ruler of Eshnunna, together with all his troops, ..., has assembled and is staying in Upe and he kept writing to the ruler of Babylon (Hammurabi) to meet him in Mankisum, but the ruler of Babylon did not agree."

A letter from a ruler of Eshnunna, thought to be Ipiq-Adad II or his successor Naram-Sin of Eshnunna, to Shamshi-Adad I of Ekallatum states:

"Šinam that you constantly favour, is like his reputation, exhausted and abandoned. Come on! Wherever Šinam went as military aid, it did not save Nerebtum, nor did it save the land of Uršitum, nor did it save Diniktum, neither Mankisum. ..."

A joint army of Shamshi-Adad I and Dādūša of Ešnunna met at Mankisum before marching down the Tigris to attack the city of Malgium.

In a text to the ruler of Eshnunna it read:

"My lord (the king of Mari) has approached the town of Mankisum with the main body of his army ... the twentieth (of the month). Have this tablet brought to your lord (the king of Eshnunna)"

After the death of Shamshi-Adad I his kingdom dissolved and many polities in the region were overrun for a time by the Elamites. They moved up the Tigris to Mankisum but then retreated and instead took Eshnunna.

After the Elamites withdrew from the region it was open to the expansion of Babylon under Hammurabi (c. 1810-1750 BC). Early in the reign of Hammurabi an Eshnunnan army had invaded the territory of Babylon and a text sent to the ruler of Mari stated, "A mass of troops of the prince of Ešnunna are assembling at Mankisum; Dannum-tahaz will cross the [ri]ver with them and go t[o] Rapiqum". It is known that there was a ford across the Tigris at Mankisum. Early in the reign of Old Babylonian Empire ruler Hamurabi a conflict between Babylon, Mari, Eshnunna, and Elam resulted in Hamurabi being in control of the Upi area. A text from Mari showed diplomacy over that area's disposition:

"If he releases Mankisum, Upi, Shahadunu, and the banks of the Tigris River three double-miles south of Upi — which is the border my grandfather Apil-Sin fixed - then, I will make peace with him. Otherwise, if I am to release Mankisum, he should repay me (for) my efforts that I expended against the Sukkal of Elam for Mankisum. (Only) then may he take Mankisum and I (will take) Upi, Shahadunu and three double-miles south of Upi (along) the banks of the Tigris River."

Late in the reign of Hammurabi Babylon entered an expansionist phase which including conquering Mankisum. In his 32nd year name of "Year Hammu-rabi the king, the hero who gains victory for Marduk, defeated with his mighty weapons the entire army and soldiers of Eshnunna, Subartu and Gutium and conquered the land of Mankisum and the land on the banks of the Tigris up to the border of the Subartu mountains" and the Dadusha of Eshnunna year name "Year in which Dādūša seized Mankisum".

The Edict of Ammiṣaduqa (c. 1646–1626 BC), ruler of Babylon, gave tax and debt relief to certain groups in a number of selected places. Four of the places – Idamaraṣ, Mankisum, Šitullum, Suḫûm, and Numḫia – were not Babylonian cites. In Mankisum only "markets" were covered. This is the last attested reference to Mankisum.

== Location ==
Hammurabi's Babylonia

Mankisum is known to have been on the Tigris River near the convergence with the Little Zab river. It has also been suggested Mankisum lay to the south in the area of modern Baghdad. The site of Tell Kurr has been suggested as the location of that as has the Baghdad neighborhood of Kadhimiya. This assumes there were in fact two Mankisums, one in the south and one in the north.

An itinerary text details a trip from Sippar to Assur by canal which stopped at Mankisum on the Tigris before arriving at Assur. It was also possible to go from Eshnunna to Rapiqum by road.

Texts from Mari indicate that the road from Rapiqum to Eshnunna crosses the Tigris river at Mankisum. Another Mari text notes that a siege took place at Mankisum.

== See also ==
- Chronology of the ancient Near East
- Cities of the ancient Near East
- List of Mesopotamian dynasties
