= Dadusha =

King of Eshnunna

King of Eshnunna
- Reign: c. 1800 - c. 1779 BC
- Successor: Ibal-pi-el II
- Died: c. 1779 BC
- Issue: Ibal-pi-el II
- Father: Ipiq-Adad II

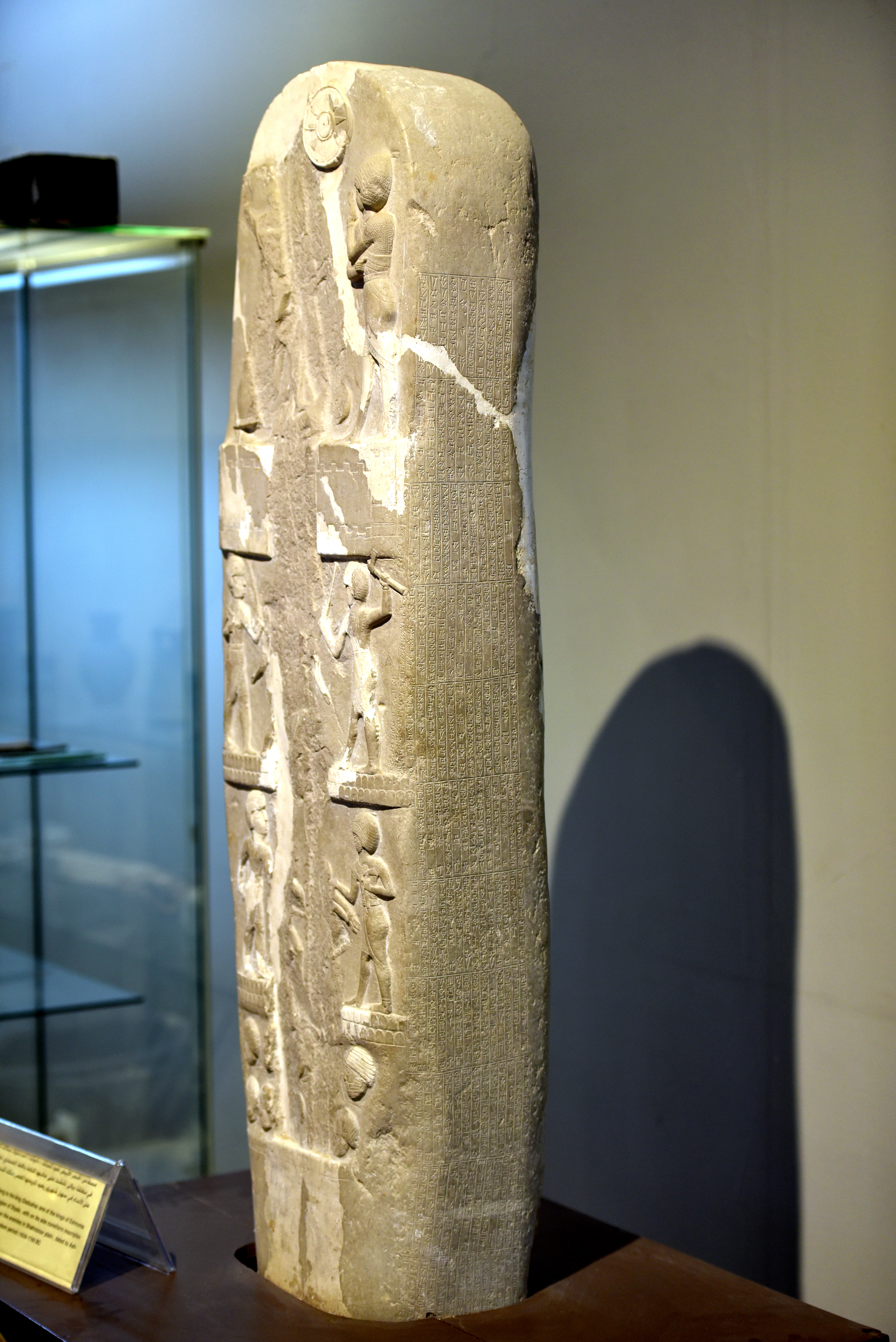
Stele of Dadusha, king of Eshnunna, Iraq Museum

Dadusha (Dāduša; died c. 1779 BC) was one of the kings of the central Mesopotamian city Eshnunna, located in the Diyala Valley.

== Family ==
He was the son of the Eshnunna king Ipiq-Adad II. Although previously kings of Eshnunna had referred to themselves as ensi (governor) of the city god Tishpak, in the early 19th century BC, rulers of Eshnunna began referring to themselves as King (Sumerian lugal). Dadusha's father Ipiq-Adad II and his brother Naram-Sin, who ruled Eshnunna before him, both used the title king and Dadusha followed suit.

== Reign ==
Ipiq-Adad II extended the control of Eshnunna to incorporate other cities in the Diyala Valley, including Nerebtum, Shaduppum, and Dur-Rimush. Dadusha followed the expansionist policies of his father and his brother Naram-Sin, mixing war and diplomacy to increase his control over areas. His continued expansionism caused Eshnunna to become one of the most powerful states in the Mesopotamian region in the early 18th century BC.

=== Alliance ===
Dadusha of Eshnunna had an alliance with Shamshi-Adad I, Amorite ruler of the Kingdom of Upper Mesopotamia. Cuneiform tablets found in the Mari Archives and the Tell Leilan archives suggest that the two kings had a formal atutu (brotherhood) treaty.

=== Military campaigns ===
==== Siege of Qabarum ====
Qabarum was situated in the fertile Erbil plain, serving as a strategic hub between the Tigris River and the Zagros Mountains. It was part of the land of Urbilum (modern Erbil). Around 1781 BC, the coalition with Dadusha and Shamshi-Adad I besieged the city, in order to subdue the area between the two Zab Rivers. Records describe the use of advanced siege engines and the eventual destruction of the city's walls.

The attack on Qabrā occurred in the last known regnal year of Dadusha and the 28th regnal year of Shamshi-Adad I. They were successful in this endeavor, and Dadusha had a victory stele commissioned commemorating the event. The fragmentary Mardin Stele of Shamshi-Adad I tells the story from a different perspective.

After its conquest, the city became a provincial center within Shamshi-Adad's kingdom, facilitating control over trade and agricultural resources in the north. Archaeological identification generally links Qabarum to Tell Baqrta, one of the largest archaeological mounds in northern Iraq, or Kurd Qaburstan.

=== Year-Names ===
Dadusha is known from a series of unsorted year-names.

Year-Names
Year	Regnal Year	Event
17xx	01	Dadusha entered the house of his father
17xx	b	Dadusha defeated the troops of Ekallatum
17xx	c	Dadusha built the unrivalled chariot of Szamasz for the (temple) etemenursag of Adad
17xx	d	Dadusha brought a statue in gold into the temple of Tiszpak, statues in gold and copper representing Dadusza
17xx	g	Dadusha seized Mankisum
17xx	ha	Dadusza brought into the temple the weapon of Szamasz
17xx	i	The daughter of the king was married in Rapiqum
17xx	k	Dadusha dug the canal Sin-abuszu
1781	ult	Year Dadusza seized Qabarum (Qabrā, in Year 28 of Shamshi-Adad I; King of Qabrā, Bunu-Ishtar is defeated and slain)

=== Stele of Dadusha ===
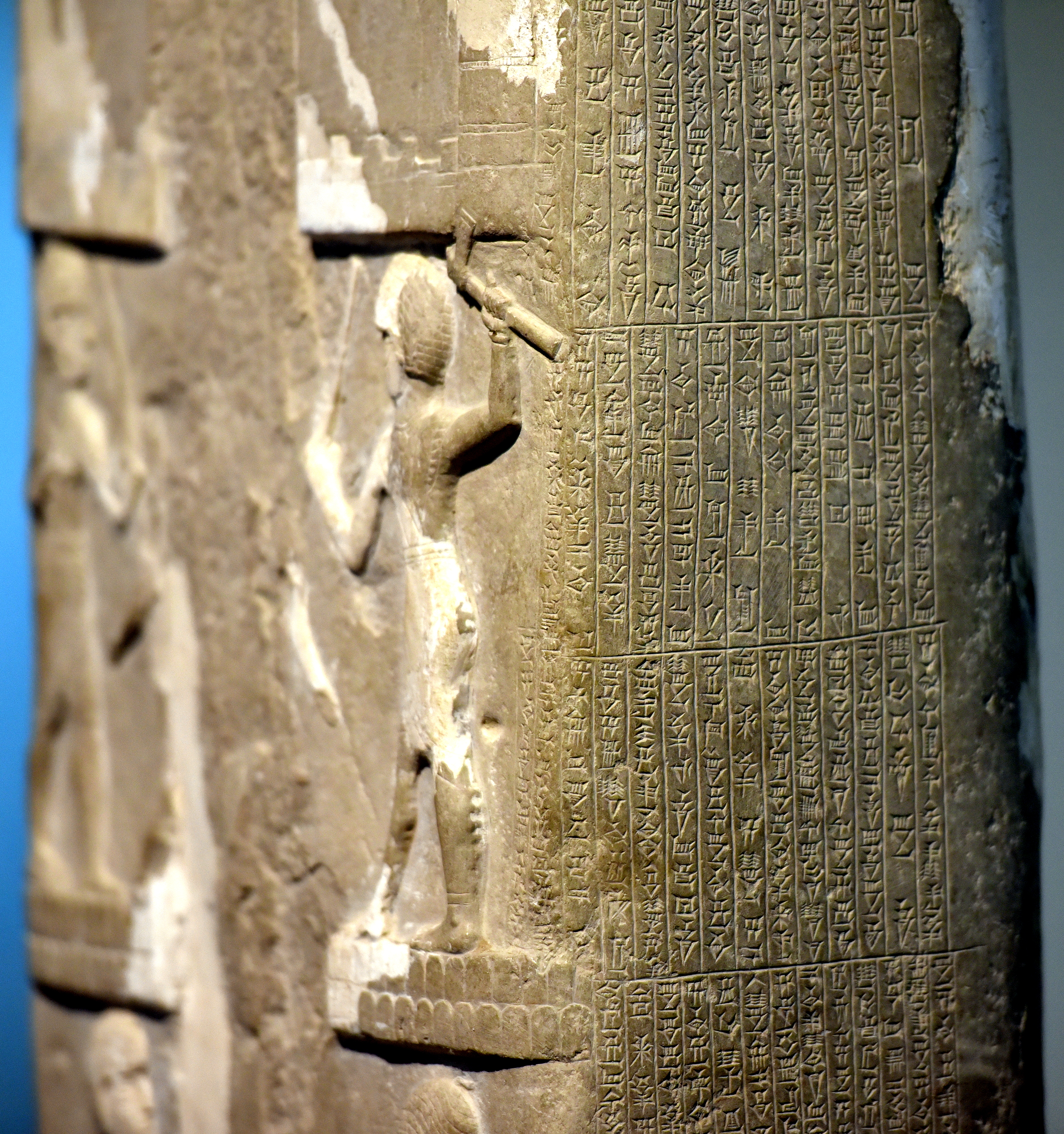
Detail, side view of the stele of Dadusha showing the cuneiform text

At Eshnunna, the Stela of Dadusha was an elongated victory stone monument commermorating the Siege of Qabra and which originally stood at the Temple of Adad. The stele was found accidentally in 1983 while digging out a well in the outskirts of the ancient Eshnunna (modern-day Tell Asmar) in Diyala, Iraq. The front side is carved with four registers while the narrow sides were inscribed with 220 lines of a cuneiform text divided into 17 columns; 1.80 meters high, 37 cm wide, and 18.5 cm thick. The center of the front side was damaged during the discovery. The upper register (the image of heroism) shows Dadusha (left) in a position of a slayer, tending on the defeated and slain King of Qabrā, Bunu-Ishtar. A standing male figure (right) adores Dadusha; this is thought to be either also Dadusha or the god Adad. The sun-disc with its rays of Shamash, combined with the crescent of Sin, appears at the central upper part. At the bottom of the image, the city walls of Qabrā appear. This stele commemorates his victory over the city-state of Qabrā (possibly Kurd Qaburstan) and its king Bunu-Ishtar, with the help of king Shamshi-Adad I of Ekallatum. The stele's inscription states that Dadusha beheaded Bunu-Ishtar and carried his head back to Eshnunna.

"... I majestically approach Qabra, his main city. In ten days I seized this city by means of a surrounding siege wall, by heaping up earth, with the help of a breach, an attack and my great strength. I swiftly bound its king Bunu-Ištar by the blaze of my strong weapon and I truly had his head quickly brought to Ešnunna. ..."

The stele dates back to the Old-Babylonian period, c. 1800-1779 BC. It is on display at the Old-Babylonian Gallery of the Iraq Museum in Baghdad. During the US-led invasion of Iraq in 2003 and subsequent ransacking of the Iraq Museum in April 2003, the stele escaped looting and vandalism.

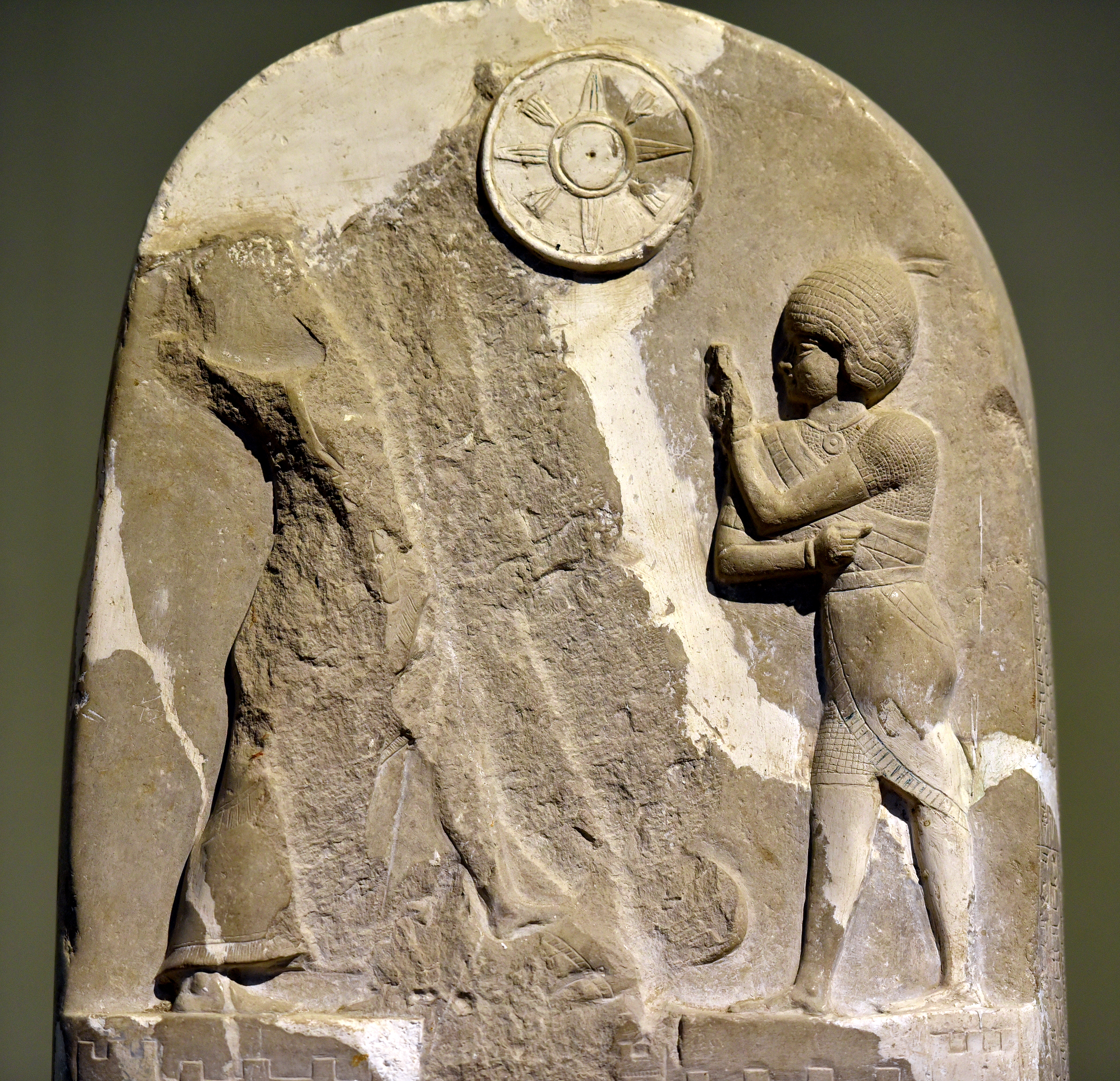
Detail, top register of the stele of Dadusha

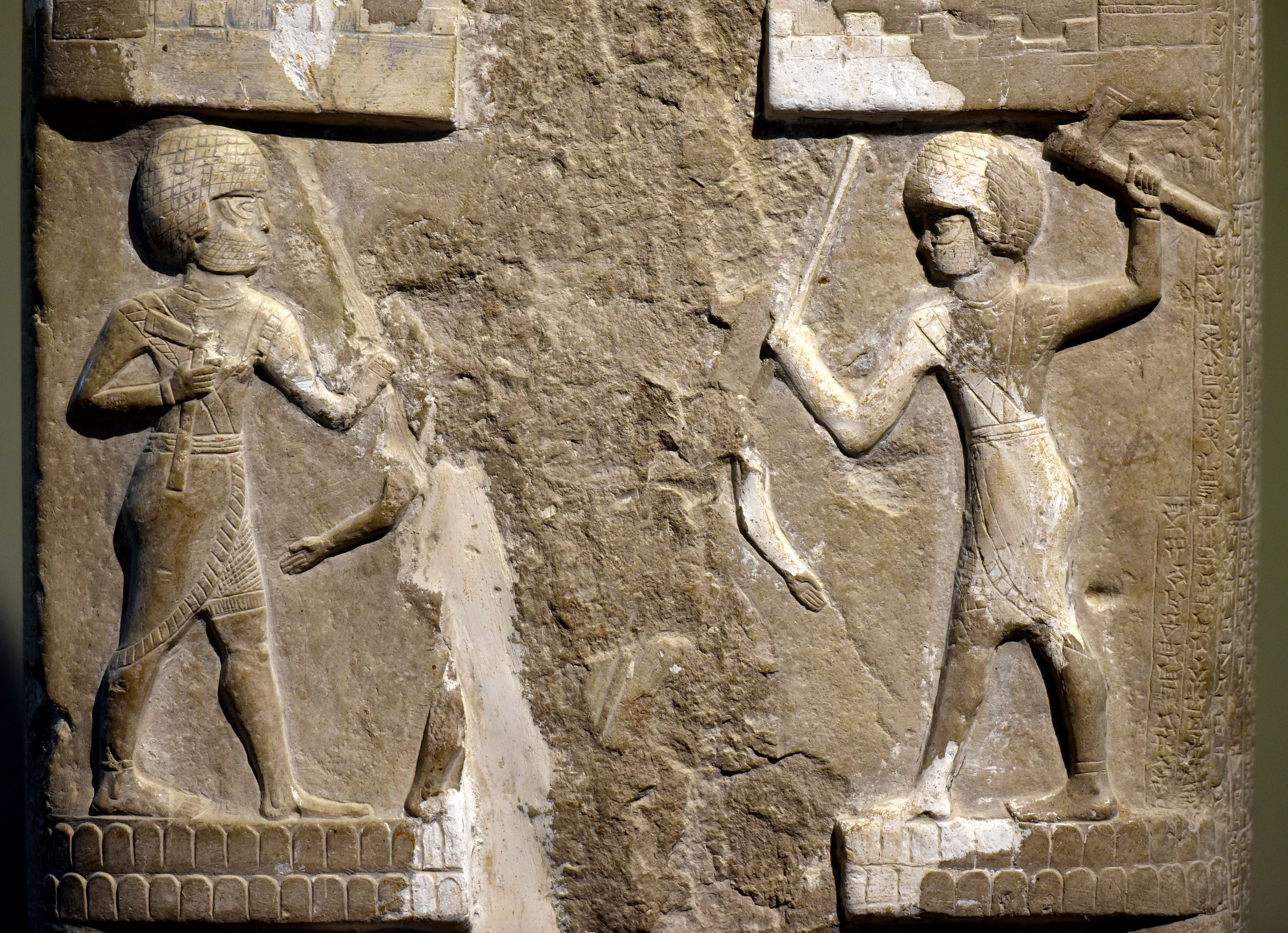
Detail, 2nd register of the stele of Dadusha

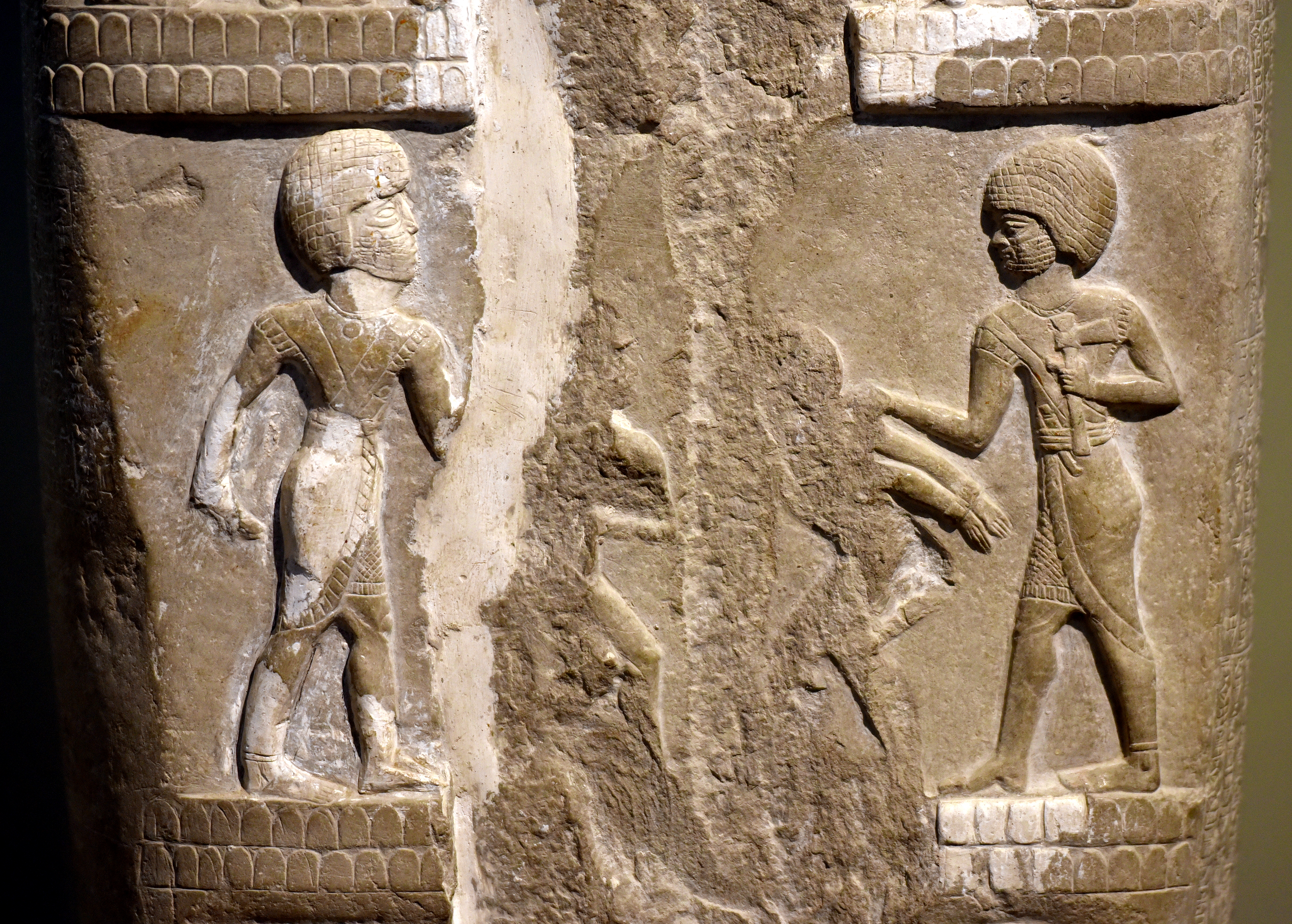
Detail, 3rd register of the stele of Dadusha

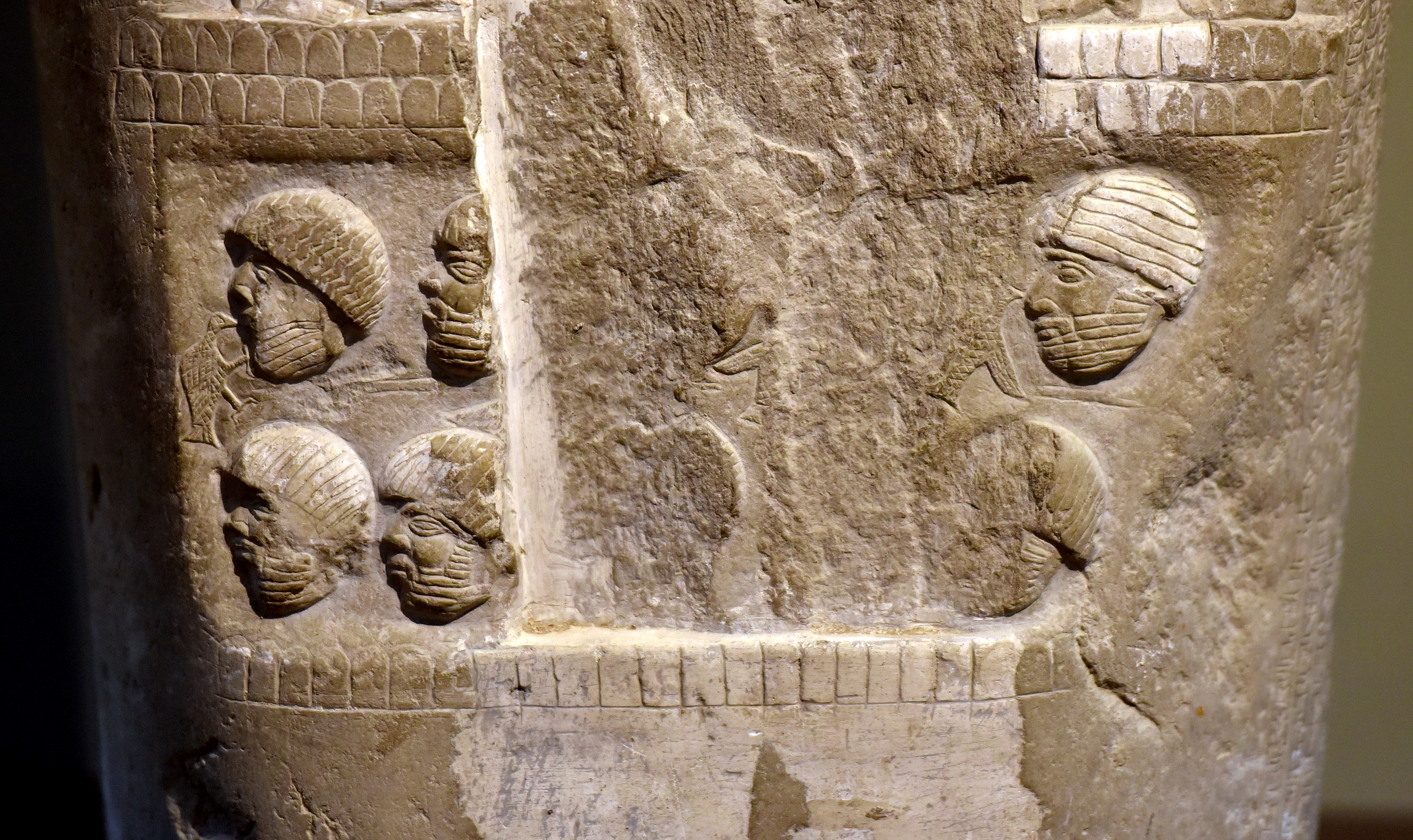
Detail, 4th register of the stele of Dadusha

=== Laws of Eshnunna ===
Two tablets found during excavations at the site Shaduppum (modern Tell Harmal) in 1945 and 1947 contain laws similar to the Code of Hammurabi, but predating them. The Laws of Eshnunna were written during or just before the reign of Dadusha, although it is not conclusive whether Dadusha wrote them or not. Some of the laws included in this code are similar to Hammurabi's Code and Moses’ Code in Exodus. For example, they all contain a code pertaining to what happens when an ox gores a man.

== Death ==
Dadusha died around 1780 BCE and was succeeded by his son Ibal pi’el II (r. 1779–1767/65 BCE).
