= Rapiqum =

Ancient city

Rapiqum (also Rapiku and Rapiqu), ra-bi-qa-wi^{KI}, was a city of the ancient Near East. The city was located in the north of Mesopotamia, probably on the eastern bank of the Euphrates River, in modern Iraq. It is firmly attested from early in the 2nd Millennium BC until early in the 1st Millennium BC.

== History ==
A single damaged tablet from year six of Ur III empire ruler Shulgi mentions Rapiqum but since the city is otherwise completely unattested before the Old Babylonian period researchers consider it a possible anachronism.

"The teeming peoples, numerous as blades of grass, from the mighty waters of the Tigris and Euphrates, ...of the Tigris, that my lord has entrusted to me, ... citizens? of the land of Gutium, ... Mari? and Rapiqum, who have...are before me. Whatever you, my king, order me to do, I will do,"

Rapiqum often interacted with the regional power Eshnunna. Ruler ^{D}Ipiq-Adad II has a year name "Year Ipiq-Adad seized Rapiqum, the dwelling place of Nin-azu". A year name of later ruler Dadusha of Eshnunna reads "Year in which the daughter of the king was married in Rapiqum". In the ninth year of the rule of his son Ibal-pi-el II a year name reads "Year Rapiqum was destroyed". That defeat was part of a war between forces led by Ishme-Dagan I of Isin, which included Eshnunna, and the empire of Mari under Zimri-Lim.

The city is mentioned in several transaction records of the time and the records of king Sin-Iddinam of Larsa,. Larsa ruler Rim-Sin year name fourteen is "Year the armies of Uruk, Isin, Babylon, Sutum, Rapiqum, and of Irdanene the king of Uruk were smitten with weapons". Rapiqum is mentioned in one tablet found at Chagar Bazar.

After defeating Eshnunna Rapiqum was taken by Hammurapi in his 10th or 11th year of rule (around 1782 BC) with his 11th year name being "Year (Hammu-rabi) seized the city wall / city, the land and the territory of Rapiqum and Szalibi". As Babylon was still fairly weak at that point the actual story is more complex. Rapiqum was actually captured by Shamshi-Adad I of Ekallatum, ruler of the Kingdom of Upper Mesopotamia and given to Hammurabi to rule. This is shown in a letter from the ambassador of Zimri-Lim to Babylon:

"... I said, “Ḫit, Ḫarbe, and Yabliya.” “You must not mention Ḫit!” he said. “ The situation is similar to what had happened when Samsi-Addu forced Rapiqum out of the king of Ešnunna’s control and gave it to me. Since then my garrison stayed there and must remain there even now. As Samsi-Addu’s garrison stayed there ever since then, Zimri-Lim’s garrison can stay also. Just as my garrison and his have stayed jointly there, these garrisons (of ours) should be merged as one. A peace accord between us must last forever."

Rapiqum, being in a key border location between competing powers, is mentioned a number of times in the cuneiform letters found there from its early 2nd Millennium BC period. Another letter, sent the ruler of Mari, with a possible location hint, would be:

"All of the nomads gathered, saying this, “Write to our lord so as to allow us to make a raid on the sheep of Išme-Dagan in Rapiqum and Yabliya. We want then to turn back toward the Bank of the Euphrates (i.e., Mari), (at which point) we will give many sheep to our lord. In this way, our lord would not keep on requesting sheep from us.” This is what all the nomads said as in one voice. ..."

In Hammurabi's 42 year of reign he reports "Year in which Hammu-rabi the king lifted up like a mountain the top of the great city wall on the banks of the Tigris, called it Kar-Szamasz, and built the city wall of Rapiqum on the banks of the Euphrates".

In an inscription of the Middle Assyrian period ruler Tukulti-Ninurta I (c. 1200 BC) he claimed to have conquered "Mari (written Ma-a-ri), Hana and Rapiqu".

Middle Assyrian ruler Tiglath-Pileser I (c. 1100 BC) wrote, on the Arameans, "I defeated them from the foot of Mt. Lebanon, Tadmar of Amurru, Anat of Suhi and as far as Rapiqu of Babylonia".

Much later the Neo-Assyrian ruler Assur-nasir-pal II (883 to 859 BC) claimed he had made all the land "as far as Rapiku" submit at his feet, being unclear whether Rapiqum itself submitted.

Briefly, from around 770 BC until sometime in the reign of Tiglath-Pileser III the Suhum region shook of control of the Neo-Assyrian empire and became an independent state with its own governors. It claimed to control territory including Rapiqu. Tiglath-Pileser III reports "At the beginning of my reign, in my first palû, in the fifth month after I sat in greatness on the throne of kingship, Ašsur, my lord, encouraged me and [I marched] against the Ḫamarānu, Luḫuʾatu, Ḫaṭallu, Rubbû, Rapiqu, ...".

== Location ==
Hammurabi's Babylonia.

A literary tablet from the Kassite period (and a later Assyrian version) records a man taking a dream journey. His path follows the Euphrates road from Sippar to Ki-i-la to Ha-bar-ar (Ha-am-ba-ri in the Assyrian version) to Ra-pi-qum to Id-da-an to Mari, then Emar.

Text from Mari indicate that the road from Rapiqum to Eshnunna crosses the Tigris river at Ma-ki-sum. This is thought to be the same city as mentioned in the 32nd year name of Hamurapi "Year Hammu-rabi the king, the hero who gains victory for Marduk, defeated with his mighty weapons the entire army and soldiers of Esznunna, Subartu and Gutium and conquered the land of Mankisum and the land on the banks of the Tigris up to the border of the Subartu mountains" and the Dadusha of Eshnunna year name "Year in which Dadusza seized Mankisum".

The region in the north between Mari and Eshnunna was called Suhum. When Eshnunna controlled that region its governor resided at Rapiqum. That governor was also an intendant at the newly build city of Haradum in the Suhum.

The modern cities of Ramadi, Fallujah, and Hit have been suggested as the location for Rapiqu, mainly due to being on the Euphrates and in the right general location. There is as yet no archaeological or epigraphic support for this. In the case of Hit, since Rapiqu was associated with the ancient Mesopotamian "river ordeal" (River god of Rāpiqum) and Hit has also been linked to that.

Hit would seem to be ruled out by an itinerary of Tukulti-Ninurta II (890–884 BC) who said, of his travels;

"Moving on from Dur-balati I pitched camp (and) spent the night in the city Rahimmu which is before the city Rapiqu — Rapiqu lies on the other bank of the Euphrates. Moving on from Rahimmu I pitched camp (and) spent the night in the area of Kabsitu which is upon the Euphrates. Moving on from the city Kabsitu I pitched camp (and) spent the night in the city Daiasetu. Moving on from Daiasetu(60) I pitched camp (and) spent the night before the city Idu, at the bitumen spring, where the stele of the great gods is erected — Idu lies on the other bank of the Euphrates."

Its exact location was previously thought to be near Ramadi but recent excavations suggest Tell Anbar, near Fallujah. Excavations in the area of Fallujah have revealed textual evidence of the city of Rapiqum. Currently thinking is that the most likely location is Tell Anbar (Tell Mirmiran), near Falluga.

== See also ==
- Cities of the ancient Near East
