= Suhum =

Ancient geographic region

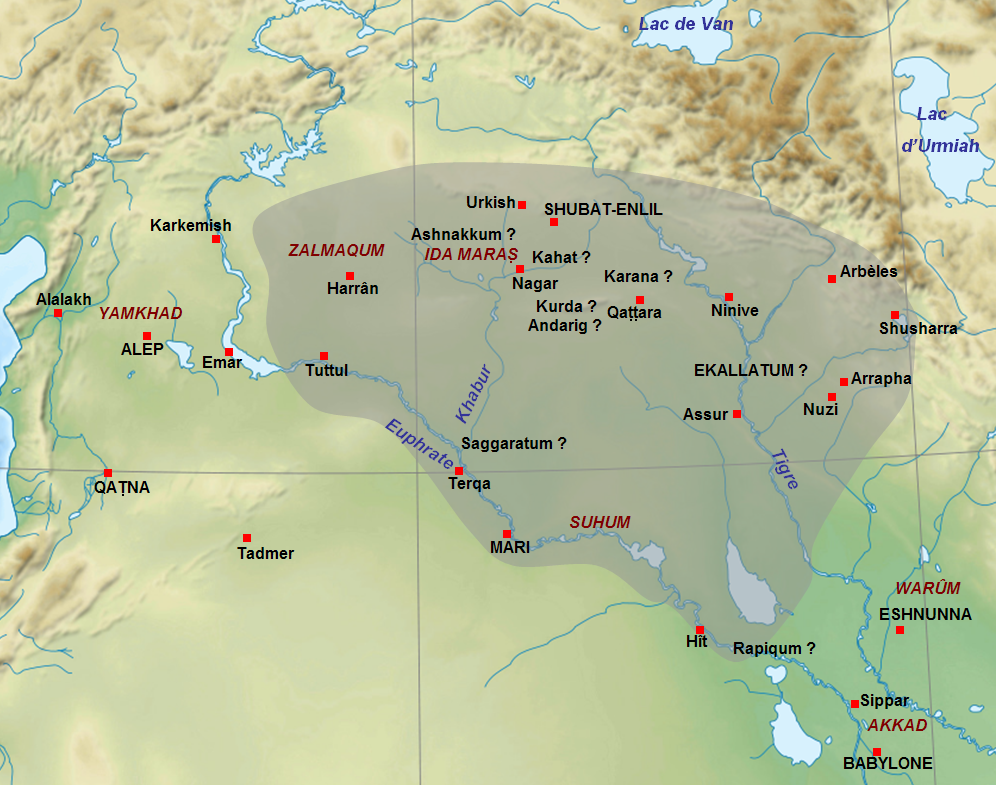
Map of Mesopotamia during the kingdom of Shamshi-Adad I showing the location of Suhum near the Euphrates

Suhum (Sūḫu, or Suhi) was an ancient geographic region around the middle course of the Euphrates River, in modern Al Anbar Governorate, Iraq.

== History ==
Its known history covers the period from the Middle Bronze Age (c. 2000-1700/1600 BCE) to the Iron Age (c. 1200–700 BCE).

=== Middle Bronze ===
During the Old Babylonian period Suhum lay at the intersection between four powerful entities, Eshnunna, Ekallatum, Mari and Babylon which at various times exercise some element of control over it. A key city in Suhum during that time was Harrâdum which marked the border between Eshnunna and Mari and was founded by Eshnunna. During the Bronze Age, Suhum was divided into an Upper Suhum which stretched from Hindanum to Sapiratum, with its major city being Hanat, and a Lower Suhum. For a time Upper Suhum was controlled by Ipiq-Adad II of Eshnunna via a governor at Rapiqum. With the rise in power of Babylon, under Samsu-iluna, control shifted and Babylon governed Suhum under a governor stationed at Hanat. Suhum was under the control of Ekallatum during the reign of Shamshi-Adad I, Amorite ruler of the Kingdom of Upper Mesopotamia, with a text reporting 1000 troops raised from there. Abi-epuḫ and Meptum were known to be governors of Suhum in that time. Several ancient letters place the Sutean people as having lived in the region of Suhum. A fragmentary text from the Old Babylonian period lists 40 workers from Suhum assigned to reaping at Sippar. There was a necropolis at Al-Ussiyeh in Suhum. Other known cities of Suhum in the Old Babylonian period were Ayyabe, Dunnum, Harbe, Hurban (in Upper Suhum), Mulhan (northernmost city of lower Suhum), Nasir, Qasa, Sapiratum (island city), and Yabliya.

=== Iron Age ===
In this period Sūru was a fortified city of Suhum. A known governor of Suhum at that time was Kudurru. For a time Suhum paid tribute to Neo-Assyrian ruler Ashurnasirpal II (883–859 BC). In 616 BCE, Suhum subordinated themselves to the king of Babylon, Nabopolassar (ruled 626-605 BC). Three years later, in 613 BC, Suhum rebelled against him, which led Nabopolassar to send an expedition against Suhum.
