= Tell Ishchali =

Archaeological site in Diyala Province, Iraq

- Nerebtum/Kiti (?)
- Location within Iraq
- 33°18′11″N 44°35′03.3″E
- Type: tell
- Location: Diyala Province, Iraq
- Region: Mesopotamia

Site notes
- Area: 23 ha (57 acres)
- Excavation dates: 1934–1936
- Archaeologists: T. Jacobsen, H. Hill

Tell Ishchali (also Iščāli or Šaǧālī) is an archaeological site in Diyala Province (Iraq) a few hundred meters from the Diyala River, a tributary of the Tigris, and 3 miles south by southeast from the ancient city of Khafajah. It is thought to be ancient Nērebtum or Kiti and was, for part of its history, under the control of the city-state of Eshnunna which lies about 20 miles to the northeast. It is known to have been occupied during the Isin-Larsa period and Old Babylonian period with excavations ending before earlier levels were reached. Tell Ischali lies about 3 miles (4.8 km) southeast of the modern city of Baghdad.

== Ancient name ==
At first, the site of Ishchali was confused with Tutub (now known to be at Khafajah). Upon discovery of a date formula that read "year that king Ishme-Bali built the great wall of Nerebtum", that designation gained some support, although the temple dedicated to Inanna suggested Kiti as another possible toponym. Currently, scholarly opinion is split between Nerebtum and Kiti as the result of many tablets from the temple of Inanna of Kiti being analyzed. The name of Sadlas was also proposed, though an agreement between the rulers of Nērebtum (Ḫammi-dušur) and Šadlaš (Sumu-numhim) on the disposition of prisoners of war is now known.

=== Nērebtum ===
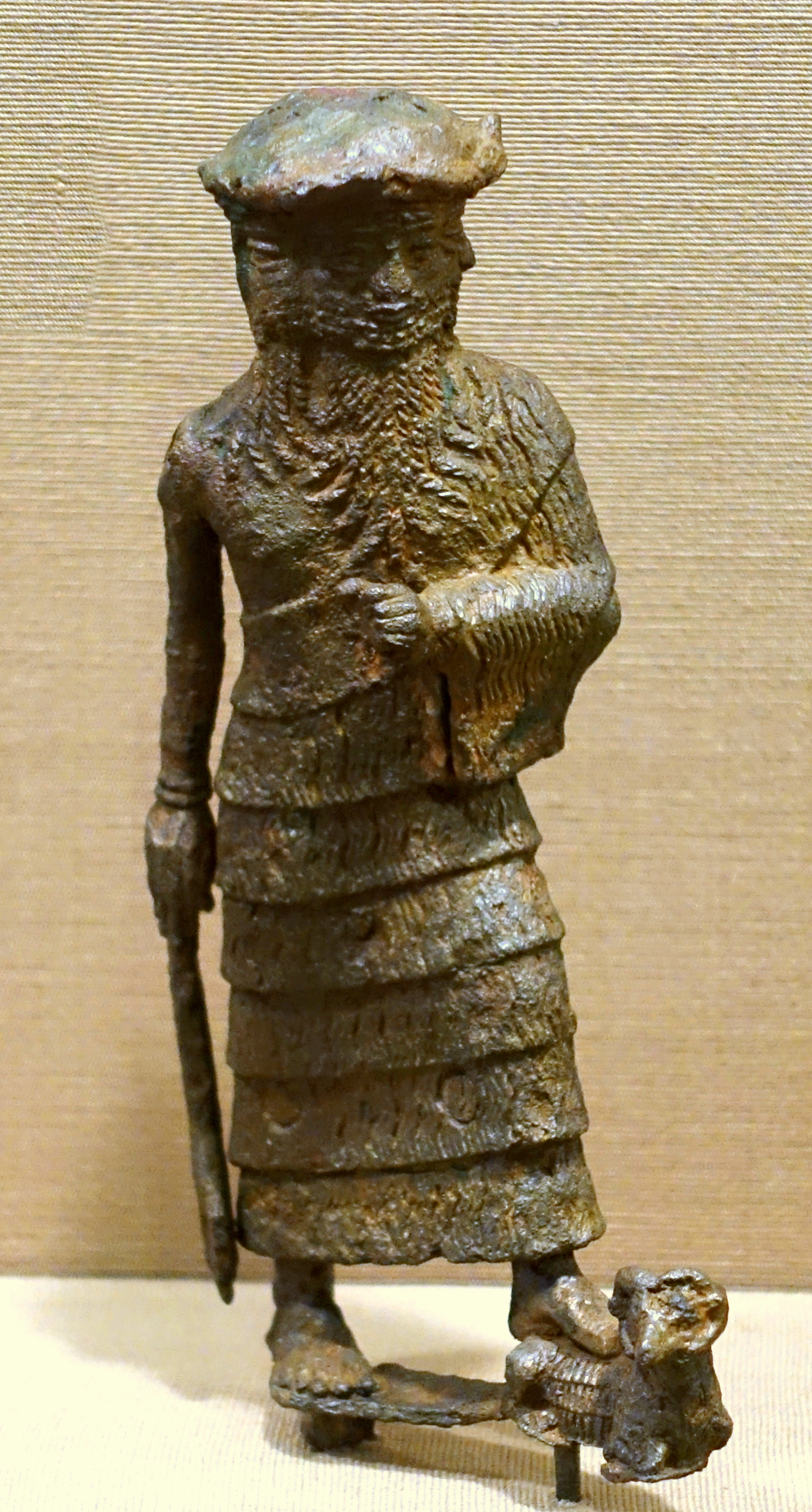
Four-faced god statuette, Isin-Larsa to Old Babylonia periods, 2000–1600 BC, Ishchali. Oriental Institute Museum.

A number of bricks of Ipiq-Adad II were found in the Kitium temple inscribed with:

"To Inanna Kititum did Ipiq-Adad, the mighty king, the king who enlarged Eshnunna, shepherd of the dark headed (people), beloved of Tispak, son of Ibal-pi-el, grant Neribtum"

Besides Ḫammi-dušur (also Ammi-dušur) two other local rulers of Nērebtum are known from the Old Babylonian period. One, Ikūn-pî-Sîn, also controlled nearby Tutub. He was a contemporary of Sabium (c. 1844–1831 BC), early ruler of Babylon. A single year name of Iku(n)-pi-Sin is known from a text found at Khafajah reading "Year following (the year) when Iku(n)-pi-Sin cap[tured] Diniktum". Presumably it followed one reading "Year when Iku(n)-pi-Sin captured Diniktum".

An oath text of Ibal-pi-El I, ruler of Eshnunna mentions Ikūn-pî-Sîn and provides synchronism with several rulers:

"... Should Sabum, king of Babylon, or Iku(n)-pi-Sin, (king of Nerebtum), write me for troops, I shall not give (either of) them troops; my troops shall not battle those of Sin-iddinam, king of Larsa, or of Sin-kašid, king of Uruk; I shall not perfidiously have my troops stand against them. Until Sin-iddinam and Sin-kašid make peace with Sabum and Iku(n)-pi-Sin, I shall never make peace (with them) ..."

Sîn-abušu, the other known ruler of Nērebtum, had a fairly long reign. Roughly 20 of his year names are known including "Year in which Sîn-abušu the king gave his daughter to (the ruler of) Mankisum", "Year in which Sîn-abušu the king gave his daughter to (the ruler of) Rapiqum" and "Year in which by means of the omens the daughters of Sîn-abušu were chosen in Dur-Rimush". The unlocated city of Dur-Rimush has been suggested as the location of Akkad.

Other proposed rulers of Nērebtum are Išmeḫ-bala and Sumun-abi-yarim.

During the reign of Rîm-Anum, ruler of Uruk (c. 1800 BC) prisoners of war from Nērebtum were grouped with those of Eshnunna and Akkad for example "Nabi-Šamaš, a man from Nērebtum, Sîn-napšeram, a man from Ešnunna, [NN], a man from Akkad, […]-iddinam, a man from Ešnunna, a total of four slaves, [pris]oners whom [Dagānma-ilum] sent from [Mutiaba] ...".

=== Kiti ===
The location of Kiti, the cult site of Inanna of Kitītum, is as yet unknown, though it has been suggested that it was an earlier name for Tell Ishchali. She was worshiped in the Diyala region including at the capital city of Eshnunna where this oracular inscription was found:

"O king Ibalpiel, thus says Kititum:/The secrets of the gods are placed before me./Because you constantly pronounce my name with your mouth, I keep disclosing the secrets of the gods for you./On the advice of the gods and by the command of Anu, the country is given you to rule./You will ransom the upper and lower country,/you will amass the riches of the upper and lower country./Your commerce will not diminish, there will be a perm[anent] food of peace [for] any country that your hand keeps hold of./I, Kititum, will strengthen the foundations of your throne,/I have established the protective spirit for you.May your [e]ar be attentive to me!"

Kiti is mention on two texts found at Tell Asmar (Eshnunna) "4 sila oil for sacrifices in ki-ti^{ki} on the day Bilalama went (away)" and "4 sila oil to ki-ti^{ki} for anointing purposes".

== History ==
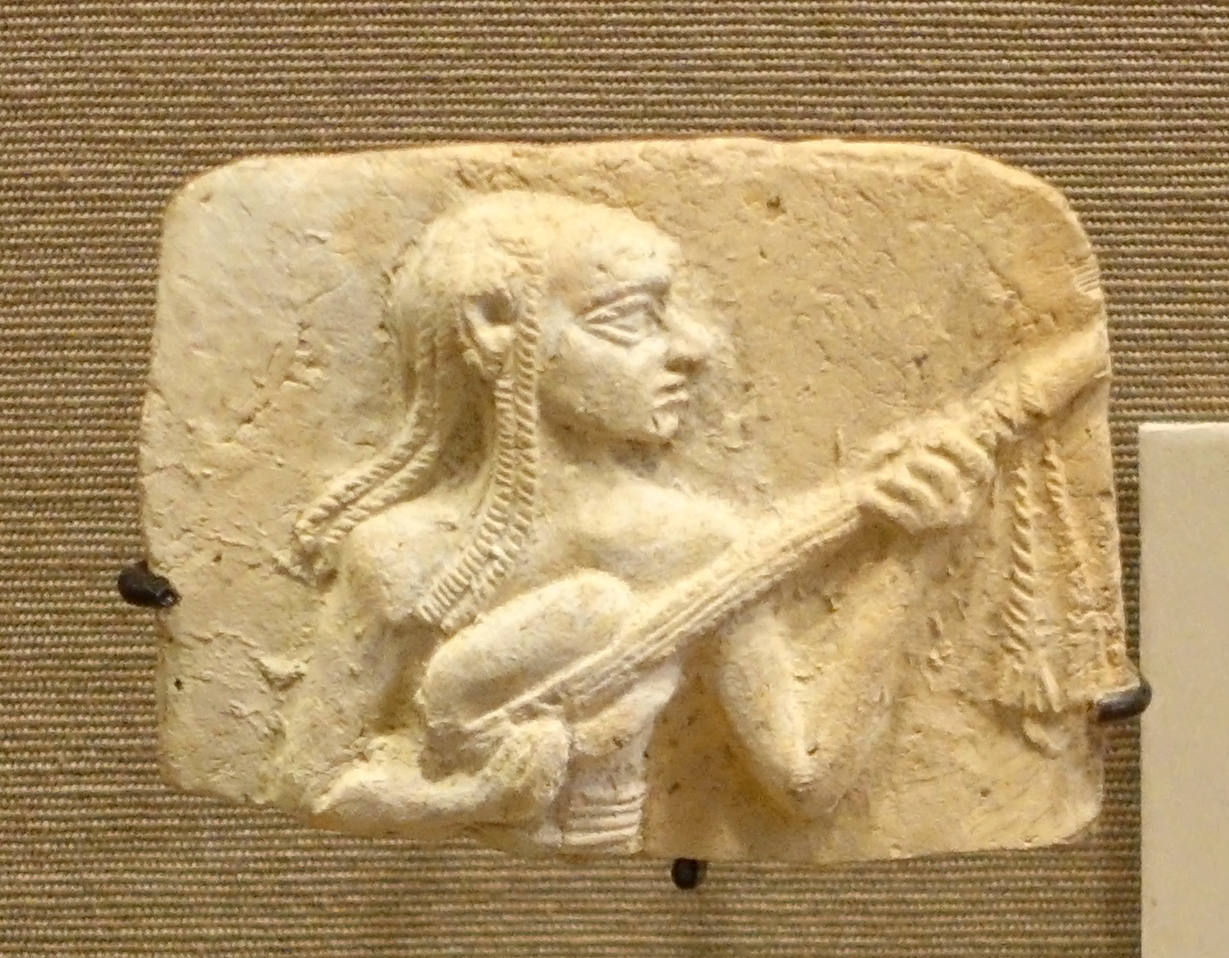
Plaque with musician playing a lute, Ischali, Isin-Larsa period, 2000–1600 BC, baked clay - Oriental Institute Museum

Finds, including stamp seals and cylinder seals, from the Uruk III (Jemdat Nasr) period and Early Dynastic period were found deposited in a ritual context in the Kitītum temple complex and are thought to have been heirlooms of undetermined provenance. Excavated epigraphic evidence and other finds date to the Old Babylonian period. While a few early local rulers are known, for most of the known history of Ishchali kings from Eshnunna held sway there, including Ipiq-Adad and Ibal-pi-El. During the time of Sabium, king of Babylon, Ibal-pi-El I of Ešnunna, Sîn-iddinam of Larsa and Sîn-kašid of Uruk the king of Nerebtum was Iku(n)-pi-Si.

== Archeology ==
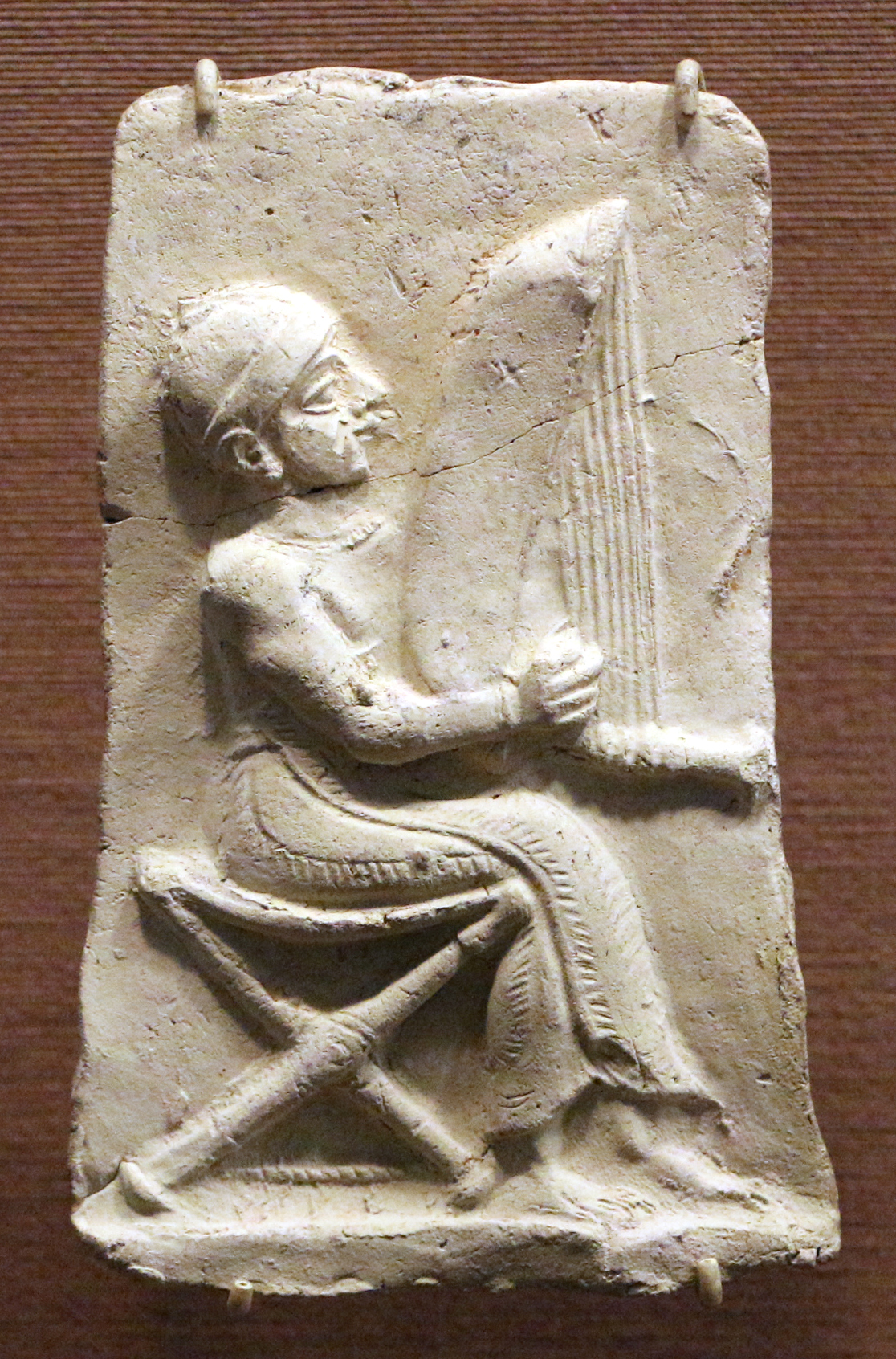
Plaque with harp player, from Ishchali

The site is a 600 meter by 300 meter irregular mound, with a low spur reaching northward at the northwest corner and small outlying mounds to the north and south, heavily marked by robber holes. The site was surrounded by a city wall, only partially excavated, with at least one large gate. The wall had a width of 8 meters and in the gatehouse of the entrance gate two cuneiform tablets were found.

In the 1920s, items from illegal excavations at Ishchali began appearing on the open market, including many clay tablets. Significant brick robbing by locals was also occurring. To pre-empt this activity, the Iraq expedition of the Oriental Institute of Chicago conducted two seasons of excavations there between 1934 and 1936. The expedition was led by Henri Frankfort and the work at Ishchali was handled by Thorkild Jacobsen and architect Harold Hill, all of the Oriental Institute. The architect died before publication leaving only an outline and a few chapter drafts. The excavation only covered the Kitītum Temple, a non-public area south of that temple called the "Serai" by the excavators, a short portion of the city wall with one gate, and the Shamash Temple adjacent to that gate. Excavations only reached the Isin-Larsa level before excavations ended.

A number of cuneiform tablets from the Old Babylonian period were found and later published. For a few tablets the provenance is in dispute between Ishcali and Khafajah. Of the 280 tablets excavated, 138 went to the Oriental Institute with the remaining 142 assigned to the Iraq Museum. Among them was a fragment of the Epic of Gilgamesh. The tablets illegally excavated from Ishchali are in many locations including the Phoebe A. Hearst Museum of Anthropology at Berkeley, the Musée d'Art et d'Histoire in Geneva, Iraq Museum, Oriental Institute, and the Free Library of Philadelphia. The archive of the chief administrator (sanga) of the Kititum temple is represented by 155 purchased Free Library tablets and 55 excavated Oriental Institute tablets as well as others in the Iraq Museum.

=== The Serai ===
South of the Kitītum Temple was a large private residence (thought to have originally been two residences later joined) which the excavators named the Serai. In 1919 a shepherd found two bronze statues here (in a bronze bowl) and they were sold, through a dealer, to the Oriental Institute Museum (A7119 and A7120). Local residents directed the excavators to the site and this was where work began. A number of cuneiform tablets and clay sealings were found at the Serai as well as hematite weights, terracotta figurines and plaques and a bone cylinder seal.

=== Inanna Temple ===
The most notable feature of Ishchali is the main temple. It was that of Inanna-Kititum, or Inanna of Kiti (occasionally called Ištar-Kititum). It is one of the largest temples ever found in the ancient Near East at 100 meters by 65 meters, oriented from the southwest to the northeast. The temple lay on a raised platform supported by a brick retaining wall. The lower 13 courses of brick were mortared with mud and those above with bitumen. Rebuilt several times, always following the original plan, the monumental building consisted of one large temple on the west side and two smaller areas on the north which are thought to be shrines (the northwestern most shrine was used for domestic type activities in the later periods). The excavators suggested that one of the small shrines was that of Ninshubur, the sukkal of Kititum though there was no finds to support that. The main, western, temple had a cella, antecella (with entrance towers having vertical grooves), and forecourt. Its main entrance to the south also had flanking towers. In the innermost room of the temple (pirishtum) "two accounts of gold and precious stones were found, as well as various seal cylinders".

The main, western, temple was at an elevation 4 meters above the surrounding neighborhood while the remaining part of the Kititium Temple was only raised by 2 meters. A cylinder seal, found in the main temple, was inscribed "Mattatum, daughter of Ubarrum, for her recovery to Kititum presented (this seal)" as well as a building brick with an inscription of Eshnunna ruler Ipiq-Adad II dedicated to Ištar-Kititum. Small finds included terracotta plaques and a copper lamp in the form of a lion found in the antecella of the main temple. The southeast third of the temple was occupied by a large open interior courtyard similar to that at the Temple Oval at Khafajah The interior courtyard measured 32 meters wide and 48 meters long. At the southwest end a large staircase flanked by fluted towers led up to the main temple. At the northeast end a second large staircase, also flanked by fluted towers, led down to the street. The excavators defined a stratigraphy with four phases:

- Phase I-A - Original building
- Phase I-B - Second occupation of the original building
- Phase II-A - Rebuilding of north wing (3rd occupation of the original building)
- Phase II-B - Fourth occupation of the original building
- Widespread conflagration in the Temple and nearby "Serai" area
- Phase III - Second building period
- Phase IV - Third building period
- Conflagration

It is generally thought that the Phase III construction was under Eshnunna ruler Ipiq-Adad II (c. 1862-1818 BC) and Phase IV under Eshnunna ruler Ibal-pi-el II (c. 1779–1765 BC) and has been suggested that the final destruction came in the 31st year of Babylon ruler Hammurapi (c. 1792-1750 BC) reflected in the year name "Year Hammu-rabi the king, the heros who gains victory for Marduk, defeated with his mighty weapons the entire army and soldiers of Esznunna ...".

The many tablets found at the Kitītum Temple give an excellent picture of temple life. A number of cylinder seals dating from the Early Dynastic to the Larsa period were also found there, assumed to be relic donations to the temple. Cylinder seals, from the Isin-Larsa and Old Babylon periods, were also found at the Shamash temple and in private homes.

Based on texts found there the excavators suggested that there was also a shrine of Ištar-Kititum "e-^{d}INANNA k i - t i" at Eshnunna .

=== Sin Temple ===
Aside from the temple of Ištar-Kititum, a small temple of Sin called the "Temple of the Gate" was also found. The excavators referred to it as the Sin Temple based on cuneiform tablets found there, though it was referred to as the Shamash Temple in another document (apparently based on seal iconography). Specifically, on text of a court case mentioned "in the gate of the god Sin-sa-kamanim" (speculated to mean Sin of the scone), a contract had Sin at the head of a list of witnesses, another was witnessed by Sin and the ruler Sumu-abi-arim, and lastly one that had barley going to the "donkeys of the god Sin". The temple was built around a central courtyard and had a number of adjacent outbuildings. Small finds included terracotta plaques, maceheads, and a lion shaped jewelers weight The temple, lying next to the main gate in the city wall to the east of the Kitītum Temple, was only excavated down to the level of Phase 2 of the Kitītum Temple.

Of note, in the treaty between Šadlaš and Nērebtum it states:

"If there has occurred a robbery of cattle or sheep, (and) if it is under the reach and authority of the judges, (then) if he (the accused) is a citizen of Nērebtum, (he shall take) the oath of a citizen of Nērebtum, (namely) by the god Sin of Kamanum; the oath of a citizen of Šadlaš (will be) by the god Sin of Ur-Iškur"

The god Sin of Kamanum (den.zu sha ka-ma-ni-im) is also known from texts at Shaduppum and from Eshnunna where in a case the judges led the litigants to the gate of Sin in Kamanum to swear the god's oath. A that point the litigants come to agreement "Im Tor des Sîn von Kamanum".

== Artifacts from Ishchali ==
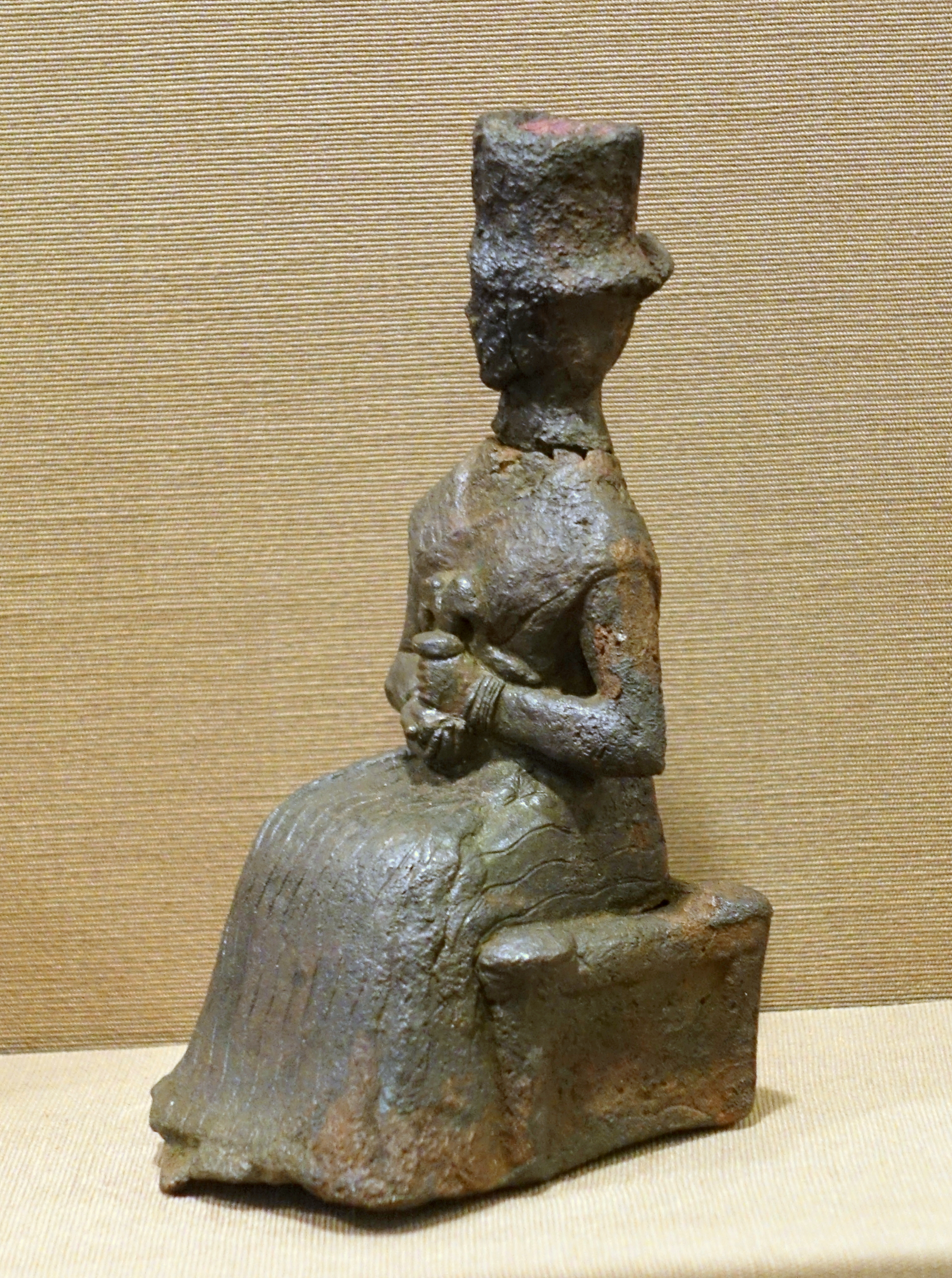
Four-faced goddess, Ishchali, Isin-Larsa to Old Babylonia periods, 2000–1600 BC, bronze - Oriental Institute Museum, University of Chicago

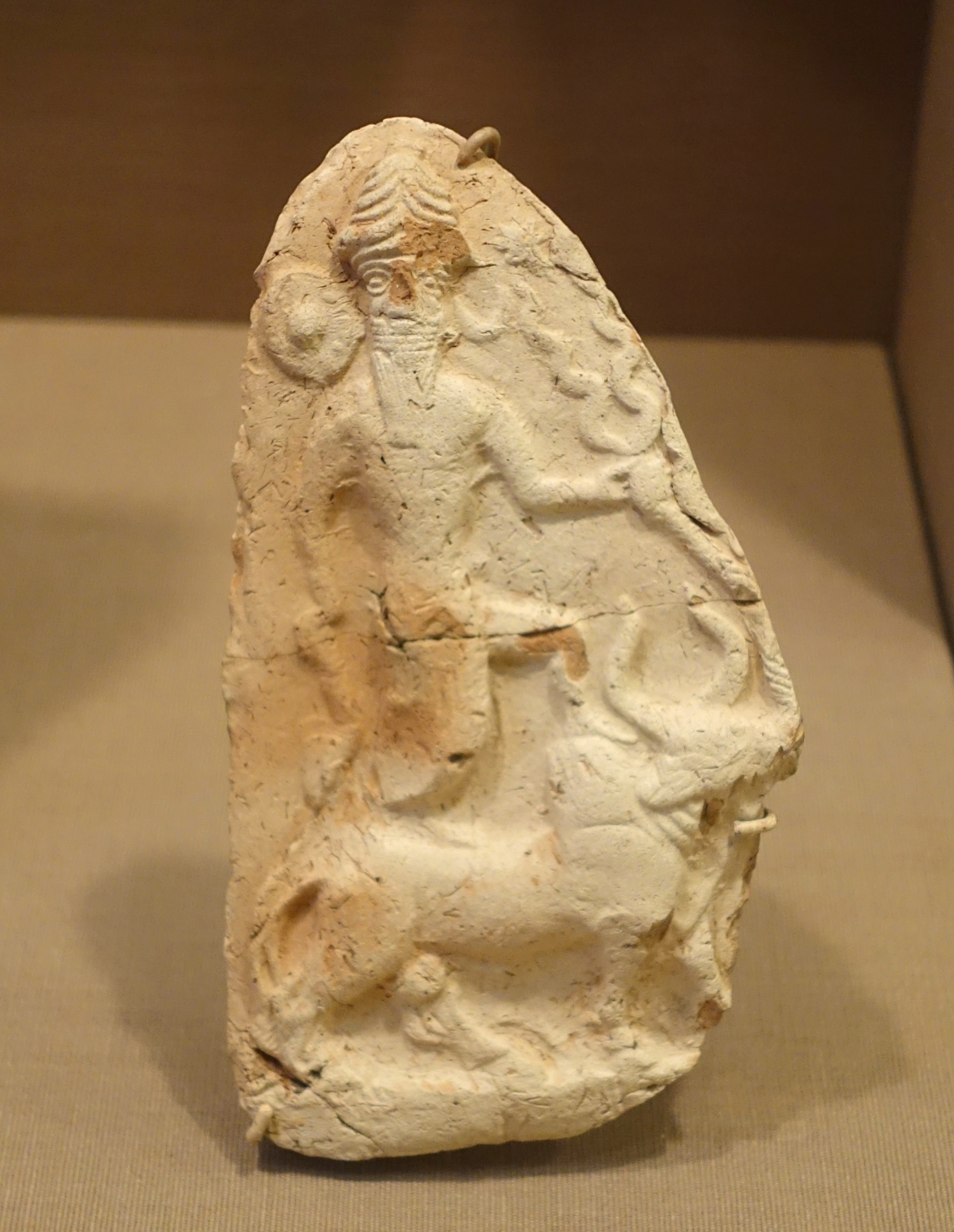
Storm god, Ishchali, Isin-Larsa to Old Babylonian, 2000–1600 BC, baked clay - Oriental Institute Museum, University of Chicago

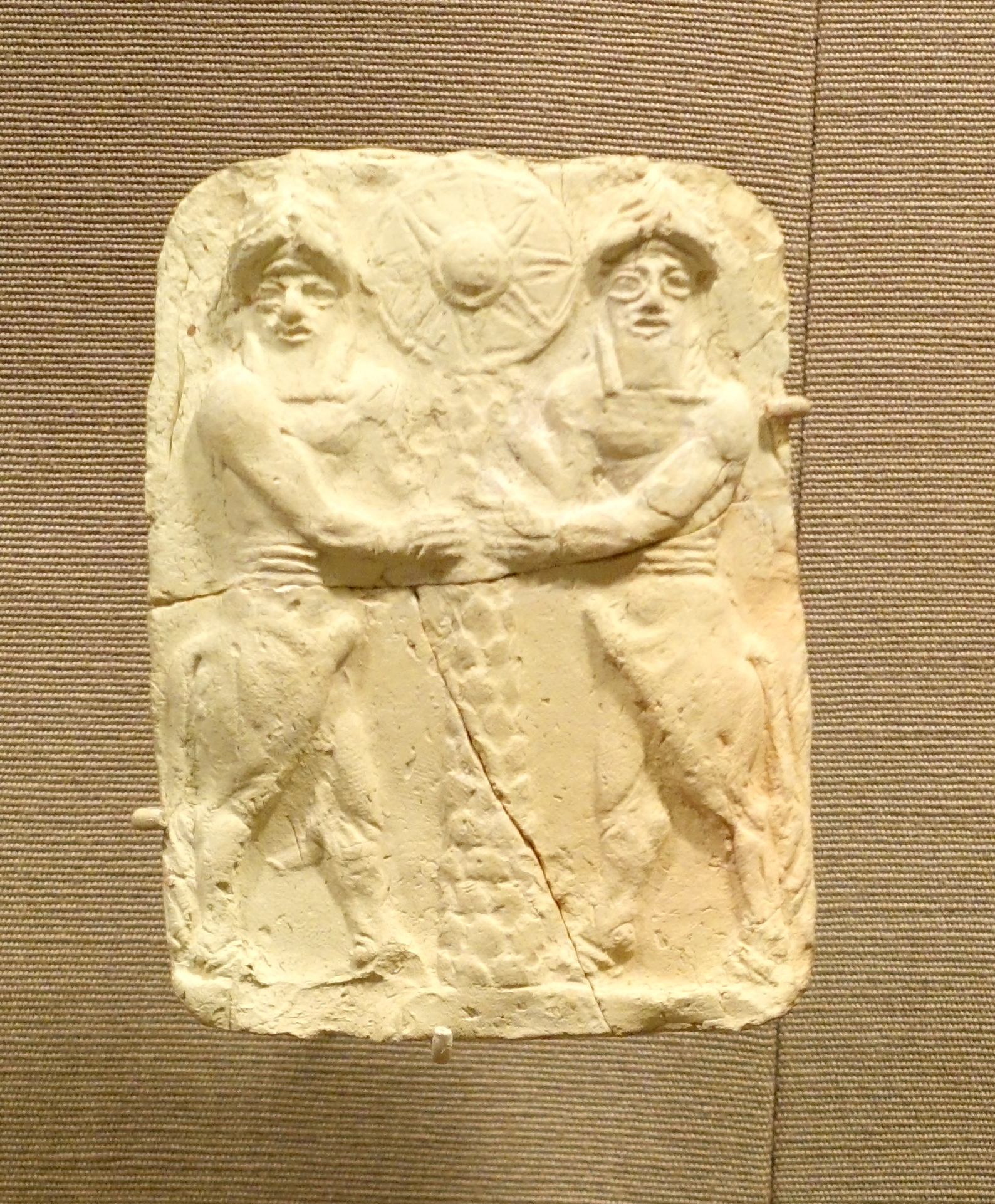
Plaque with bull-men holding a palm trunk with sun disk, Ishchali, Isin-Larsa to Old Babylonian, 2000–1600 BC, baked clay - Oriental Institute Museum, University of Chicago

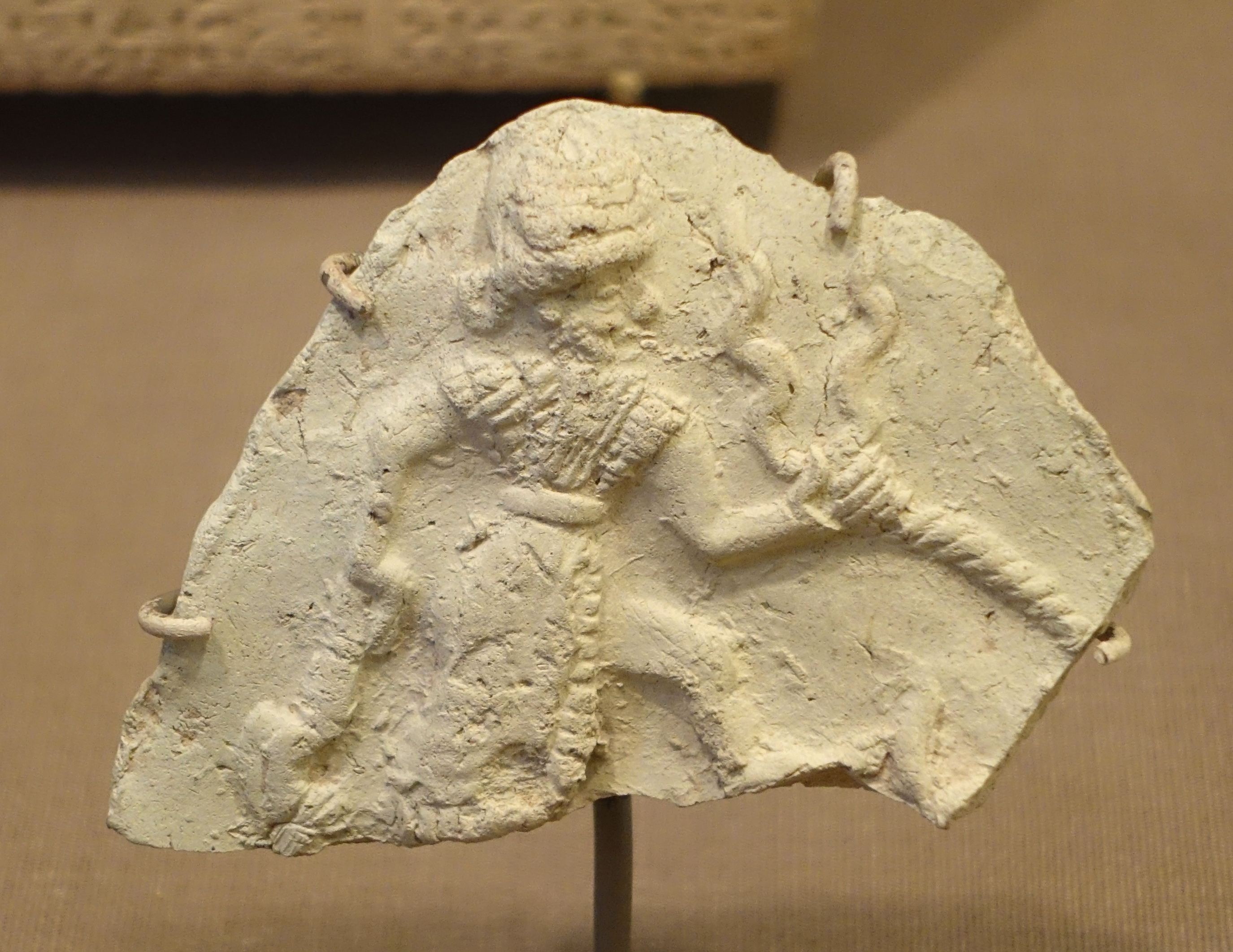
Storm god, Ishchali, Isin-Larsa to Old Babylonian, 2000–1600 BC, baked clay - Oriental Institute Museum, University of Chicago

== See also ==
- Cities of the ancient Near East
- List of Mesopotamian deities
- List of Mesopotamian dynasties
- Short chronology timeline
