= Haradum =

Archaeological site in Iraq

- Khirbit ed-Diniye
- Location within Iraq
- 34.433333°N 41.600000°E
- Type: settlement
- Periods: Bronze Age, Early Iron Age
- Location: Al Anbar Governorate, Iraq

History
- Built: Early 2nd millennium BC

Site notes
- Excavation dates: 1981-1988
- Archaeologists: Christine Kepinski-Lecomte
- Condition: Ruined
- Owner: Public
- Public access: Yes

Haradum (also Harrâdum), modern Khirbit ed-Diniye (also Khirbet ed-Diniyé), in Al Anbar Governorate Iraq, was an ancient Near East city on the middle Euphrates about 90 kilometers southeast of Mari. It was part of the ancient region of Suhum. The name of the town meant "the place where one stands watch". It was strategically placed on the border of four kingdoms, Eshnunna, Ekallatum, Mari and Babylon and is thought to have been first settled by Eshnunna. It is known that a tollbooth was established on the river and a toll collected.

== History ==
=== Middle Bronze Age ===
Babylonia at the time of Hammurabi, ca. 1792-1750 BC

While the site of Haradum was occupied earlier, under the control of Eshnunna, being mentioned in texts from Mari, after a hiatus it grew into a proper town until the 18th century BC under the control of the First Dynasty of Babylon. Tablets from the reign of Babylonian rulers Samsu-iluna, Abi-eshuh, Ammi-ditana, and Ammi-saduqa have been found at Haradum. The earliest dated text is from the 26th year of Samsu-iluna (c. 1749–1712 BC), son of Hammurabi, and the latest text is from the 18th year of Babylonian ruler Ammi-saduqa (c. 1646-1626 BC). For a time under the reign of Samsu-iluna lost Babylon control of Haradum to the city of Terqa but soon regained it.

=== Iron Age ===
Two cuneiform tablets from the late Middle Assyrian period, apparently during the reign of Aššur-dān I (c. 1178–1133 BC), were also found. It was later the site of a Neo-Assyrian fortress.

Haradum is noted for being one of the earliest examples of a planned city, with a rectilinear layout and straight streets. It contained two temples (dedicated to Ishtar and Adad respectively) but no palace.

== Archaeology ==
The site of Haradum is small, about 1.5 hectares in area (a 150 by 150 meter square) with a fortification wall having a main gate in the western wall. It was excavated for six seasons between 1981 and 1988 by a team from the Délégation Archéologique Française en Iraq led by Christine Kepinski-Lecomte. A number of cuneiform tablets were found in residential and temple contexts. The work was a salvage operation in response to Haditha Dam construction though by the end of excavations the site had still not been inundated. Cuneiform tablets, found in private houses and the mayoral residence, included divination texts:

"... If a scorpion strikes a man on the right side, that man will grumble. If a scorpion strikes a man on the left side, that man will have a victorious conquest. If a snake falls on a man's head, that man will experience difficulty. If a snake, from a rafter in a man's house, in between two men or two companions falls, one of them will die. ..."

The excavators found four 2nd Millennium BC building layers. The first (3D) was from the time of Mari ruler Zimri-Lim (1775–1761 BC) and included a fortification wall. Later construction followed the street plan established at that time. The subsequent levels, under Babylonian and later Middle Assyrian rule dated c. 1750-1700 BC (3C), c. 1700-1665 BC (3B) destroyed by fire, and c. 1665-1130 BC (3A).

Part of the later was overlaid, in the 11th through 8th centuries BC, by the fortress named Haradu, controlled by the Middle Assyrians, the Aramaeans, and then the Neo-Assyrians. The fortress had a casemate wall with angles oriented to the cardinal points and no internal structures and is considered to be a strictly military construction. It had three construction phases. The first phase was laid on the remains of the Old Babylonian defensive wall of Haradum. The second phase reinforced the casemate wall and included a tomb dug into the bedrock. Grave good included "bronze objects, a goblet, a sieve, a zoomorphic drinking vessel, two knobs of a stick, small plaques" also a bunch of iron arrows held together with a thread and one gold earring. The third and final phase added buttressing and the fortress reached its maximum size of 150 square meters with 30 meter thick defensive fortifications. A cemetery was found at the southwest of the wall.

A 3-D virtual relality reconstruction of the site is being developed, Patrimoine du Proche-Orient.

== See also ==
- Cities of the ancient Near East
- Short chronology timeline
