= Ibal-pi-el II =

King of Eshnunna
- Reign: c. 1779 - c. 1765 BC
- Predecessor: Dadusha
- Successor: Silli-Sin
- Died: c. 1765 BC
- Father: Dadusha

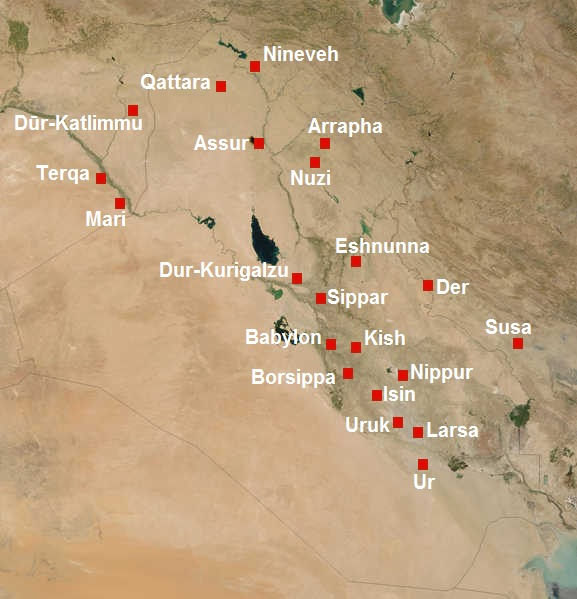
Mesopotamia in the 2nd millennium BC

Ibal-pi-el II (died c. 1765 BC) was a king of the kingdom of Eshnunna (c. 1779-1765 BC) in ancient Mesopotamia.

== Family ==
He was the son of Dadusha and nephew of Naram-Sin.

== Reign ==
He conquered the cities of Diniktum and Rapiqum. With Hammurabi and the Amorite king Shamshi-Adad I he besieged the kingdom of Malgium until its ruler bought them off with 15 talents of silver.

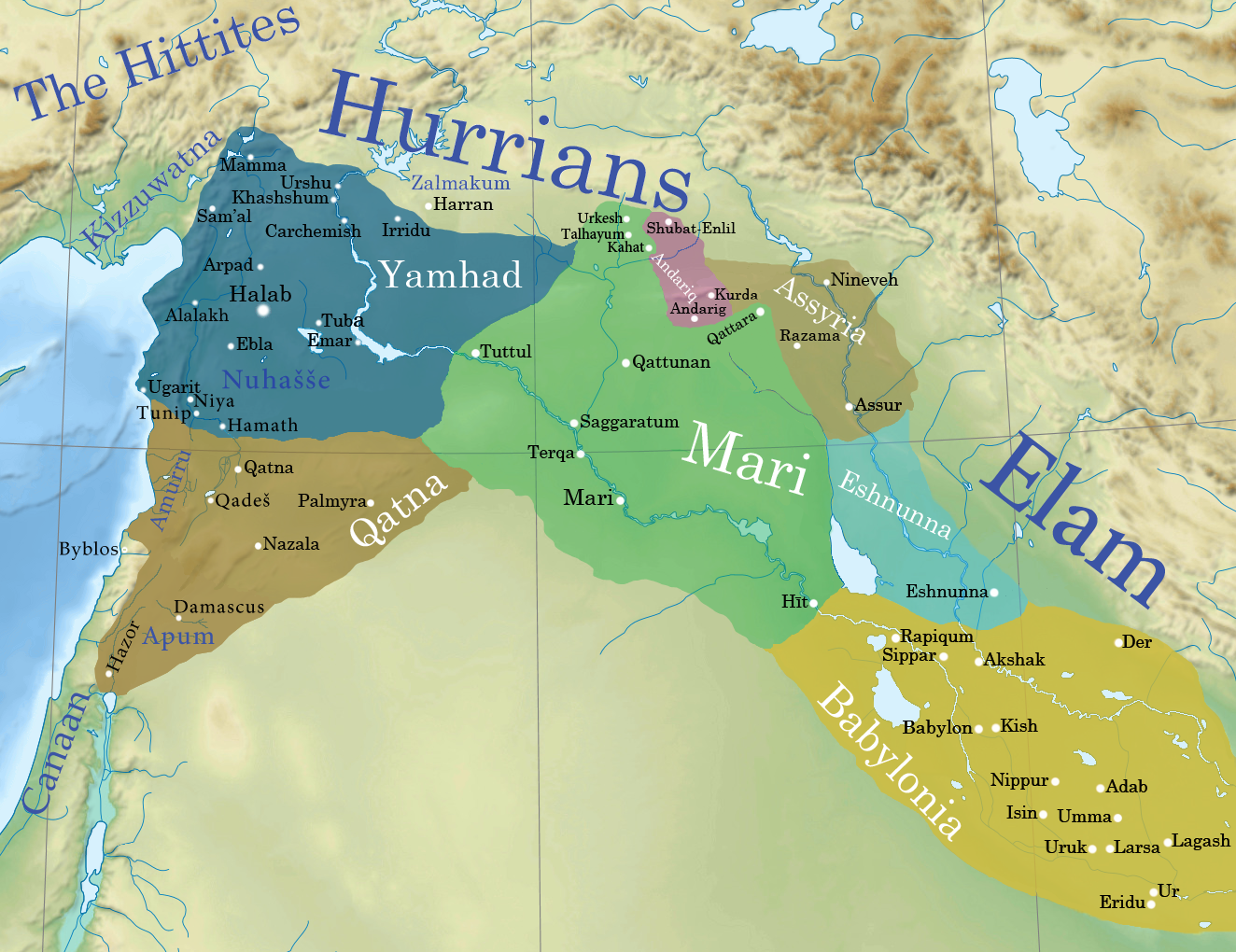
Map of Eshnunna

=== War with Shamshi-Adad I ===
He was a contemporary of Zimri-Lim of Mari, and formed powerful alliances with Yarim-Lim I, Amud-pi-el of Qatanum, Rim-Sin I of Larsa, and Hammurabi of Babylon to appose the rise of Shamshi-Adad I in the Kingdom of Upper Mesopotamia on his northern border who himself had alliances with Carchemish, Hassum, Urshu, and Qatna. The death of Shamshi-Adad I occurred in Year-Name 5 of Ibal-pi-el II of Eshnunna.

=== Fall of Eshnunna ===
Around 1767 BC, Siwe-Palar-Khuppak of Elam formed a coalition with Zimri-Lim of Mari and Hammurabi of Babylon. He led this coalition against Eshnunna, conquering it and imposed direct rule from his sukkal Kudu-zulush in Susa.

=== Religion ===
==== Tispak (deity) ====
In Eshnunna (Tell Asmar), the Great Temple of Tišpak (Tishpak) was known as the Esikil (Sumerian: E_{2}-sikil "Pure House"), dedicated to the patron deity of the city, Tishpak. The temple was originally dedicated to the chathonic god Ninazu who was associated with snakes. When Tishpak replaced Ninazu some time between the Akkadian and Isin-Larsa periods, the Esikil became his main sanctuary. The square temple is famous for its hoard of statues, and was the formal state temple where the kings of Eshnunna performed religious duties. While Tishpak was regarded the true king (Lugal) of the city, the kings themselves merely used the title ensi (governor) or steward. During the reign of Ibal-pi-el II, several year-names are dedicated to the temple and statues made for Tishpak.

==== Adad (deity) ====
Eshnunna also had a less prominent Temple of Adad, a deity often invoked in legal oaths and royal inscriptions. The kings dedicated cultic objects to his sanctuary (E_{2}). Ibal-pi-el II dedicated a golden chariot.

==== Enlil (deity) ====
Ibal-pi-el II claimed to have built the Temple of Enlil called the House of Judgement, as Enlil was often mentioned in economic text where legal oaths were sworn by the "Life of Enlil". The temple is also known from the Laws of Eshnunna.

=== Laws of Eshnunna ===
The Laws of Eshnunna are generally dated to the early 18th century BC. They were once thought to date to king Bilalama (c. 1930 BC), but tablets found at Tell Abu-Harmal (ancient Šaduppūm) suggested they were promulgated during the reign of Dadusha or his son Ibal-pi-el II. These laws precede the Laws of Hammurabi by some decades. Unlike the Hammurabi Code inscribed on a grand stone stela, these laws were found as Akkadian cuneiform tablets (Old Babylonian dialect) in an administrative archive as functional legal references copies.

=== Year-Names ===
Ibal-pi-el II is known from a series of year-names. His highest attested year-name is regnal year 12, while there are three additional unsorted year-names. His reign-length was 12-15 years.

Year-Names
Year	Regnal Year	Event
c. 1779 BC	1	Ibal-pi-El became king (lugal)
c. 1778 BC	2	Ibal-pi-El brought into the temple of Adad a travel-chariot in gold
c. 1777 BC	3	The gate of the chapel
c. 1776 BC	4	Ibal-pi-El seized the land of Mahazum (province/district located on the Diyala River)
c. 1775 BC	5	Year Samsi-Addu died (synchronization; Year 18 of Hammurabi of Babylon (r. 1792-1750 BC))
c. 1774 BC	6	The beloved Esikil of Tiszpak (Tishpak)
c. 1773 BC	7	A statue in gold was made, statues in gold were brought into the sanctuary [of Tiszpak]
c. 1772 BC	8	The temple of Enlil was built, (Ibal-pi-El) built the temple of Enlil (called) the house of his judgement
c. 1771 BC	9	Rapiqum was destroyed
c. 1770 BC	10	The troops of Subartu and Hana (Hanaeans, region under Zimri-Lim of Mari in Middle Euphrates later centered on Terqa) were defeated by weapons
c. 1769 BC	11	Ibalpiel brought into the temple of Nin-azu a wagon in gold
c. 1768 BC	12	Ibal-pi-El built the temple of Esztar (Eštar, Ishtar)
c. 1767 BC	a	Syupur-Szamasz and Asztabala (Aštabala, Upper Euphrates, near Birecik) were seized
c. 1766 BC	b	Ibal-pi-El brought into the temple of Tiszpak a plow in gold
c. 1765 BC	c	Chariot of Szamasz (Shamash) in gold

== Death ==
Around 1765 BC, he was attacked and eventually killed by Siwe-Palar-Khuppak of Elam, who captured Eshnunna. He was succeeded by Silli-Sin.

== Theories ==
Some scholars have suggested the biblical king Amraphel may have been Ibal Pi-El II of Eshnunna, while others consider Ameraphel to be Hammurabi.
