= Shaduppum =

Archaeological site in Baghdad

Tell Harmal
- Shaduppum
- Location within Iraq
- 33°18′34.1388″N 44°28′01.4340″E
- Type: tell
- Periods: Old Babylonian
- Location: Baghdad, Baghdad Governorate, Iraq
- Region: Mesopotamia

Site notes
- Excavation dates: 1945–1949, 1997–1998
- Archaeologists: Taha Baqir, Sayid Muhammed Ali Mustafa, P. Miglus, L. Hussein

Shaduppum (Šaduppȗm), modern Tell Harmal (also Tell Abu Harmal and Tel Harmal), is an archaeological site in Baghdad Governorate (Iraq). Nowadays, it lies within the borders of modern Baghdad about 600 meters from the site of Tell Muhammad (possibly ancient Diniktum). In the Old Babylonian period, it was part of the kingdom of Eshnunna. Other cities in the kingdom lie not far away, including Eshnunna (30 miles to the southwest) and Tell Ishchali and Khafajah, four and six miles away on the left bank of the Diyala River. The site of Tell al-Dhiba'i, thought to be the ancient town of Uzarzalulu, is about 2 kilometers away and of similar characteristics. The tutelary deity of the city was Bēl-gašer. The goddess Ninkarrak also had a cult center at Shaduppum.

== Archaeology ==
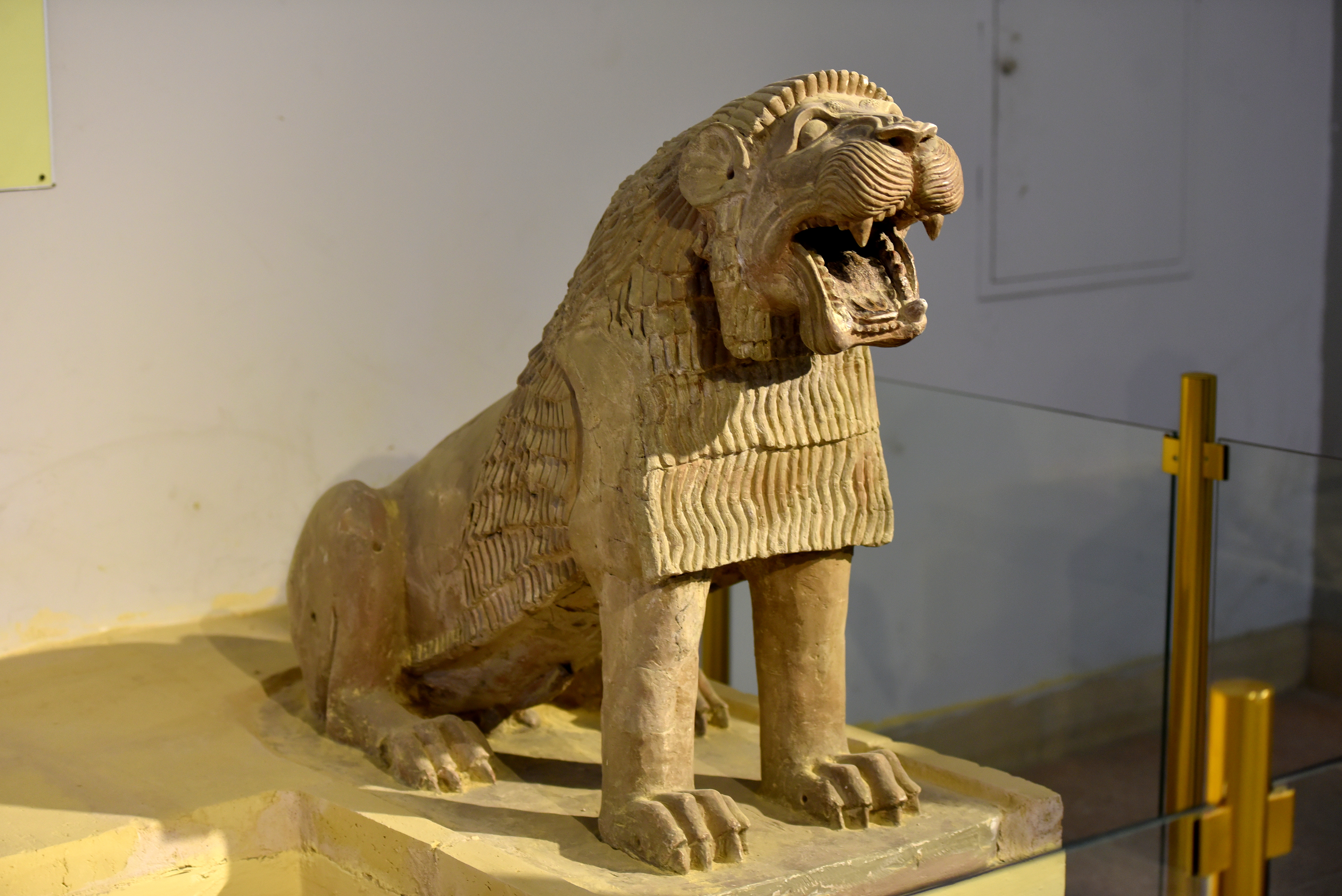
Terracotta lion from Tell Harmal, Iraq Museum

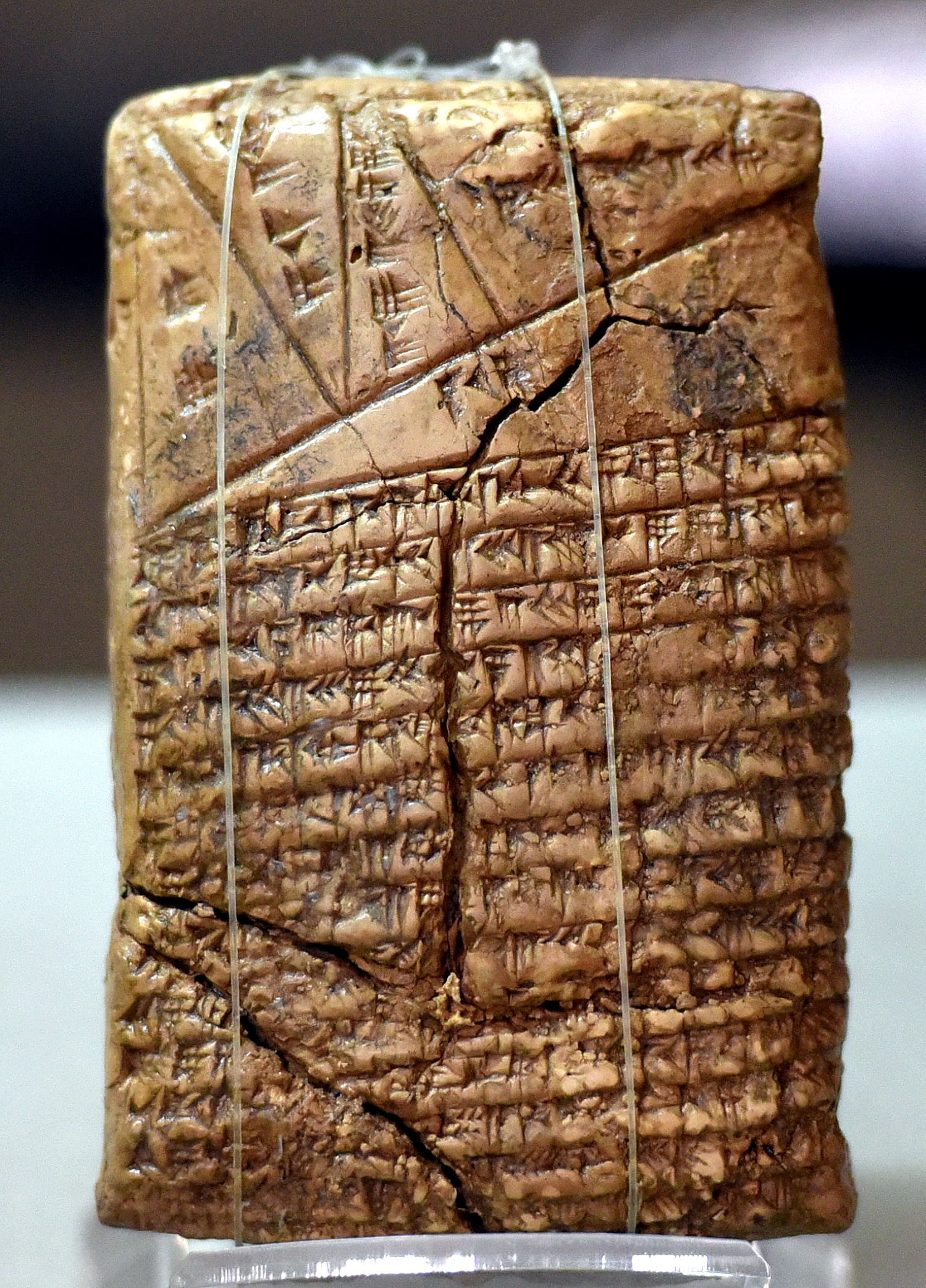
Clay tablet, mathematical, geometric-algebraic, similar to the Euclidean geometry. From Tell Harmal, Iraq. 2003-1595 BCE. Iraq Museum

The site, 150 meters in diameter and 5 meters high. Tell Harmal consists of a heavily fortified irregular rectangle (147 x 133 x 146 x 97 meters). The fortification wall had a towered gateway in the northeast and was 5.6 meters wide with 6.36 meter wide buttresses. It was excavated by Iraqi archaeologists Taha Baqir and Sayid Muhammed Ali Mustafa of the Department of Antiquities and Heritage from 1945 to 1949 in response to planned residential development and illegal digging, discovering about 3000 unbaked clay cuneiform tablets. These tablets were found in both religious and administrative contexts. Stories about Creation, the flood, the Epic of Gilgamesh, and others were inscribed on some of the tablets. Only about 1/3 have been published. Over 100 large (3.5 cm in diameter) pierced clay balls inscribed with daily brick making receipts were also found.

In 1962 the Iraqi authorities fenced off the "circuit of the town wall, on the township's main temple and on the administrative or archive centre immediately to the south-east of the main temple", reconstructed the walls to just above the ground level, and set up terracotta replicas of the Harmal Lions. The two small temples by the eastern wall were completely reconstructed for use as visitor museums. In 1997 and 1998, the site was worked by a team from Baghdad University and the German Archaeological Institute led by Peter Miglus and Laith Hussein. The earlier excavations had completely cleared Levels I and II and this excavation was to explore older periods. Ground water, lying only 2 meters below the surface, limited that to no lower than Level IV. Trenches at the town wall determined it had been constructed in early Level III (or very late in Level IV). Work at the main temple showed that it was built above an earlier temple. Many other illegally excavated tablets have found their way into various institutions.

The site contains five occupation layers. The most recent (Layer 1) is fairly rudimentary and thought to be from Kassite times. Layer II contains more substantial construction and was where most of the cuneiform tablets were found. It dates to the reigns of Eshnunna rulers like Dadusha (c. 1800–1779 BC) and Ibal-pi-el II (c. 1779–1765 BC). This layer was destroyed by fire, thought to be by Hammurabi when he captured the city in his 31st year. Layer III has largely the same building plan and is marked by the construction of the fortification wall. It dates to the earlier reigns of Ipiq-Adad II, who drove the Elamites from the land, Ibal-pi-El I, Belakum, and Naram-Suen of Eshnunna. Layer IV contains the date formula of several rulers not previously known, like Ammi-dashur. It corresponds to the time of Sumu-la-El (c. 1880–1845 BC), ruler of Babylon. Only dates of Ammi-dashur and the unknown ruler Iadkur-El were found in Layer V. A deeper level of occupation (Layers IV and V) was reached only in soundings and dated as far back as the Akkadian Empire days.

== History ==
Not much is known outside the Old Babylonian times, though clearly the location was occupied from at least the Akkadian period through the Old Babylonian period, when it was part of the kingdom of Eshnunna in the Diyala River area. It was an administrative center for the kingdom and its name means "the treasury."

The site featured a large trapezoidal wall and a large temple (28 x 18 meters in size), the location of the Harmal Lions, possibly of the goddess Nisaba and her consort Haya (called Khani by the excavators), a smaller (15 x 14 meters in size) double shrine temple, and a large (23 x 23 meters in size) administrative building. The local goddess Arhanitum are known to have been worshiped at Shaduppum and is well known from its tablets. Among the tablets from Tell Harmal are two of the epic of Gilgamesh and two with parts of the Laws of Eshnunna, found in the context of ruler Dadusha. Also found were a number of important mathematical tablets. It also produced tablets with the longest list of geographical names yet known.

== See also ==
- Cities of the ancient Near East
- List of Mesopotamian deities
- List of Mesopotamian dynasties
