= Ipiq-Adad II =

King of Eshnunna

King of Eshnunna
- Reign: c. 1862 - c. 1818 BC
- Predecessor: Ibal-pi-el I
- Successor: Naram-Sin
- Died: c. 1818 BC
- Issue: Naram-Sin; Dadusha
- Father: Ibal-pi-el I

Location of Eshnunna

Ipiq-Adad II (died c. 1818 BC) was a king of the city kingdom of Eshnunna in ancient Mesopotamia.

He was the son of Ibal-pi-el I, king of Eshnunna. Upon his ascent he used the title ensi but, later in his reign he shifted to describing himself as lugal (king). He was the first ruler of Eshnunna to use the term lugal since Shu-iliya. Inscriptions also refer to him as “king who enlarges Eshnunna”, “shepherd of the black headed people”, and “king of the universe”. He oversaw a great expansion of the state and laid the foundation for Eshnunna to become a regional power. A brick inscription found at Tell Ishchali read:

"To Inanna Kititum did Ipiq-Adad, the mighty king, the king who enlarged Eshnunna, shepherd of the dark headed (people), beloved of Tishpak son of Ibal-pi-el, grant Néribtum"

== Reign ==
Ipiq-Adad II’s military expeditions are well documented by the Mari eponym chronicles which mention his campaigns to expand Eshnunna.

Around 1857 BC, Ipiq-Adad II campaigned against Aminum (elder brother of Shamshi-Adad I) attempting to seize Shaduppum (Tell Harmal; which Aminum had just recently gained control over), although at first defeated, he was successful in their second confrontation two years later. Following this he took Me-Turan.

Sin-iddinam's recent conquest of Malgium was extending his state north, in the direction of Eshnunna. Ipiq-Adad's own expansion may have conflicted with Larsa's ambitions possibly motivating Sin-iddinam's raid of Eshnunna around 1844 BC. Eshnunna was shortly after invaded again, this time by the Elamites around 1823 BC.

After these two brief incursions against Eshnunna, Ipiq-Adad II massively enlarged his state starting around 1828 BC when he took Arrapḫa to the north. Then, to consolidate the Diyala region, he defeated Sin-abushu, king of Nerebtum and likely a vassal of Eshnunna. In his campaign against Sin-abushu he also annexed Uzarlulu and Tutub.

=== Rapiqum ===
Ipiq-Adad II then set his sights on the Euphrates. He took Rapiqum, his first city on the Euphrates, and expanded Eshnunna up the Euphrates to the Suhum region bordering Mari.

=== Year-Names ===
Ipiq-Adad II is known from a series of unsorted year-names.

Year-Names
Year	Regnal Year	Event
18xx	01	Ipiq-Adad entered the house of his father
18xx	b	Ipiq-Adad defeated/seized Unnina
18xx	c	Earth for the zikkurat of Szamasz (Shamash), year Ipiq-Adad seized the zikkurat in Iszme-Aszur
18xx	d	Ipiq-Adad defeated the Elamites
18xx	e	Ipiq-Adad seized Arraphum, Ipiq-Adad seized Gasur (Hurrian: Nuzi, Yorgan Tepe)
18xx	f	The city wall of Nerebtum was destroyed, Ipiq-Adad seized Nerebtum
18xx	h	Ipiq-Adad installed a magnificent throne dais in gold in the (temple of) Sin in Warhum, Ipiq-Adad made a magnificent throne dais for the temple of Sin in Tutub
18xx	i	A statue covered with gold and a city wall called 'szimahatu ina paszum' was built, a city wall called 'szimahatu ina paszum' was built
18xx	j	Ipiq-Adad seized Dur-meturan
18xx	k	Ipiq-Adad seized Rapiqum, the dwelling place of Nin-azu
18xx	l	Ipiq-Adad made (a statue) called 'Ipiq-Adad (judge) of the country'
18xx	m	The prince seized Halabit (Tell Halabit, Middle Euphrates closer to Emar)
18xx	n	Ipiq-Adad made a throne in gold for Nanna

== Death ==
He was succeeded by his son Naram-Sin who continued the expansion of Eshnunna.
