= Mari Eponym Chronicle =

The Mari Eponym Chronicle (MEC) is the oldest eponym chronicle, compiled at Mari in the 18th century BCE, covering the years before and during the reign of Shamshi-Adad I of the Kingdom of Upper Mesopotamia. The chronicle is an important source for the chronology of the Ancient Near East, which lists at least one notable event per year under the name of a ruling official. The chronicle is extant in eleven fragments excavated at the Royal Palace of Mari and was first edited by M. Birot in 1985.

Michel (2002) proposed the identification of a solar eclipse mentioned in the Mari Eponym Chronicle (in the year eponymous of Puzur-Ishtar) as occurring on 24 June 1833 BC. According to Werner Nahm (2014), this would date the beginning of the reign of Hammurabi to 1784 BCE (close to the date of 1792 BCE according to the Middle Chronology).

== See also ==
- Chronology of the ancient Near East
