= Shamshi-Adad I =

Amorite conqueror (r. 1808–1776 BC)

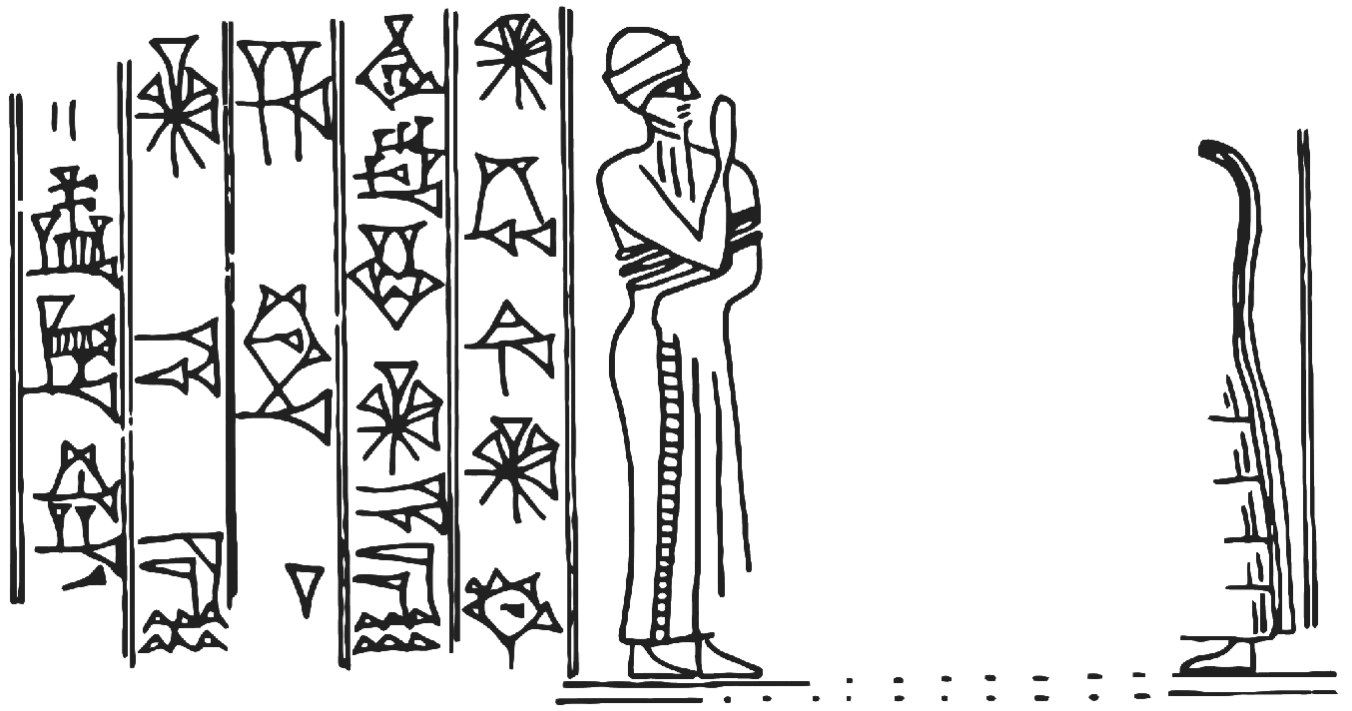
- Line-drawing of an incomplete seal of Shamshi-Adad I (𒀭𒌓𒅆𒀭𒅎 - ^{d}UTU.ši-^{d}IM)

King of Upper Mesopotamia
- Reign: c. 1809 – c. 1776 BC
- Successor: Ishme-Dagan I
- Died: c. 1776 BC
- Issue: Ishme-Dagan I; Yasmah-Adad; Shibti
- Akkadian: Šamši-Adad
- Amorite: Shamshi-Addu
- Father: Ila-kabkabu

Shamshi-Adad I (Akkadian: Šamši-Adad; Amorite: Samsi-Addu; died c. 1776 BC, ruled c. 1809–1776 BC) was an Amorite ruler of Ekallatum and conqueror who had conquered lands across much of Syria, Anatolia, and Upper Mesopotamia creating the Kingdom of Upper Mesopotamia. His capital was originally at Ekallatum and later moved to Šubat-Enlil.

== Early life ==
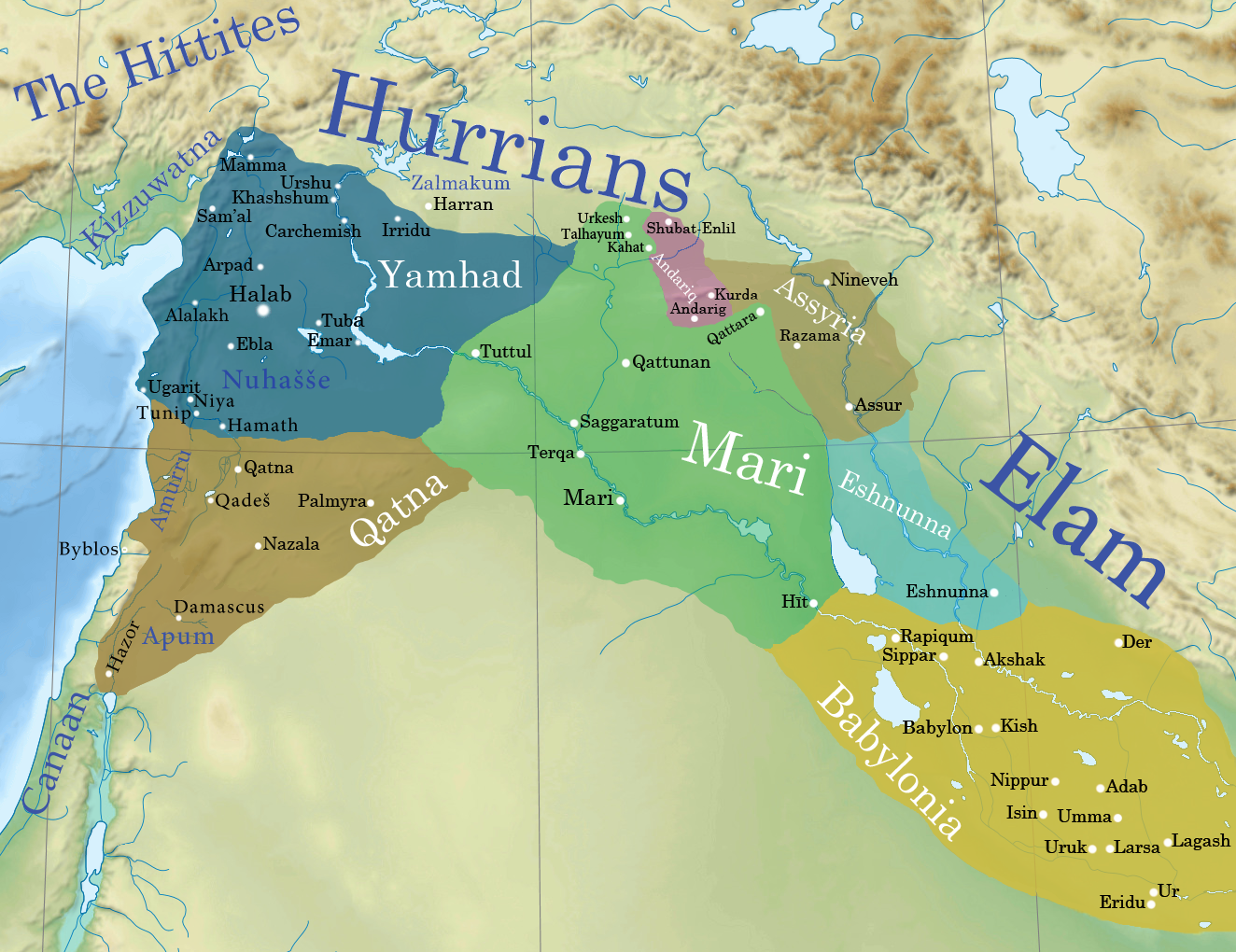
A map of the Ancient Near East showing the geopolitical situation around the Kingdom of Upper Mesopotamia (light brown) near contemporary great powers such as: Eshnunna (light blue), Yamhad (dark blue), Qatna (dark brown), the First Dynasty of Babylon (yellow), and the Third Mariote Kingdom (shortly before the conquest of the long-abandoned town of Šubat-Enlil c. 1808 BC by the Amorite conqueror Shamshi-Adad I.)

Shamshi-Adad I may have inherited the throne in Ekallatum from Ila-kabkabu (fl. c. 1836 BC – c. 1833 BC). Ila-kabkabu is mentioned as the father of Shamshi-Adad I in the much later and somewhat apocryphal Assyrian King List (AKL); a similar name (not necessarily the same figure) is listed in the preceding section of the AKL among the “kings whose fathers are known”. According to the Mari Eponyms Chronicle, Ila-kabkabu seized Shuprum (c. 1790 BC), then Shamshi-Adad I “entered his father's house” (Shamshi-Adad I succeeded Ila-kabkabu as the king of Ekallatum, in the following year.)^{:163} Shamshi-Adad I had been forced to flee to Babylon (c. 1823 BC) while Naram-Sin of Eshnunna had attacked Ekallatum. Shamshi-Adad I had remained in exile until the death of Naram-Sin around 1809 BC. The AKL records that Shamshi-Adad I "went away to Babylonia in the time of Naram-Sin". Shamshi-Adad I eventually returned, retaking Ekallatum, and went on to form the Kingdom of Upper Mesopotamia.

Although regarded as an Amorite by later Assyrian tradition, earlier archaeologists mistakenly assumed that Shamshi-Adad I had been a native Assyrian.

In the city of Assur, Shamshi-Adad I held the title "Governor of Assur". Stone tablets with Akkadian inscriptions (formatted in three columns and one hundred and thirty-five lines, from Shamshi-Adad I) have been found near the temple of the god Assur. Many bricks and objects inside the temple have the inscription "Shamshi-Adad I, Builder of the Temple of Assur" carved into them. In this inscription he claimed to have been "King of the Universe" and "Unifier of the Land Between Tigris and Euphrates". He asserted that the king of the Upper Land had paid tribute to him and that he had built the temple of Enlil. He outlined the market prices of that time as being one shekel of silver being worth two kor(gur-cube)s of barley, fifteen minas of wool, or two seahs of oil.

== Family ==
=== Children ===
While Shamshi-Adad I's son Ishme-Dagan I was probably a competent ruler, his son Yasmah-Adad appears to have been a man of weak character; something Shamshi-Adad I was not above mentioning:

"Are you a child, not a man, have you no beard on your chin?"

Shamshi-Adad I wrote in another letter:

"While here your brother is victorious, down there you lie about among the women."

Shamshi-Adad I clearly kept a firm control on the actions of his sons, as shown in his many letters to them. At one point he arranged a political marriage between Yasmah-Adad to Beltum, the princess of his ally in Qatna. Yasmah-Adad already had a leading wife and had put Beltum in a secondary position of power. Shamshi-Adad I did not approve and forced his son to keep Beltum in the palace in a leading position.

Shamshi-Adad I sent a letter on a tablet to Ishi-Addu (Beltum's father, the King of Qatna) in which he discussed their alliance, the attacks of their enemies, and the successful marriage between their children. In it Shamshi-Adad I wrote:

"I heard that you gladly dispatched my daughter-in-law on a safe way back to me, that you treated my servants when they stayed with you well, and that they were not hindered at all. My heart is very happy."

== Reign ==
Shamshi-Adad I was a great organizer and he kept firm controls on all matters of state, from high policy down to the appointing of officials and the dispatching of provisions. Spies and propaganda were often used to win over rival cities. He allowed conquered territories to maintain some of their earlier practices. In Nineveh he used state resources to rebuild the Ishtar temple. The local rulers of the city Qattara maintained authority (but became vassals) when they were incorporated into the Kingdom of Upper Mesopotamia. Use of a Eponym dating system was enforced throughout the Kingdom in cities such as: Mari, Tuttul, Terqa, Assur, and the capital city Šubat-Enlil.

=== Conquests ===
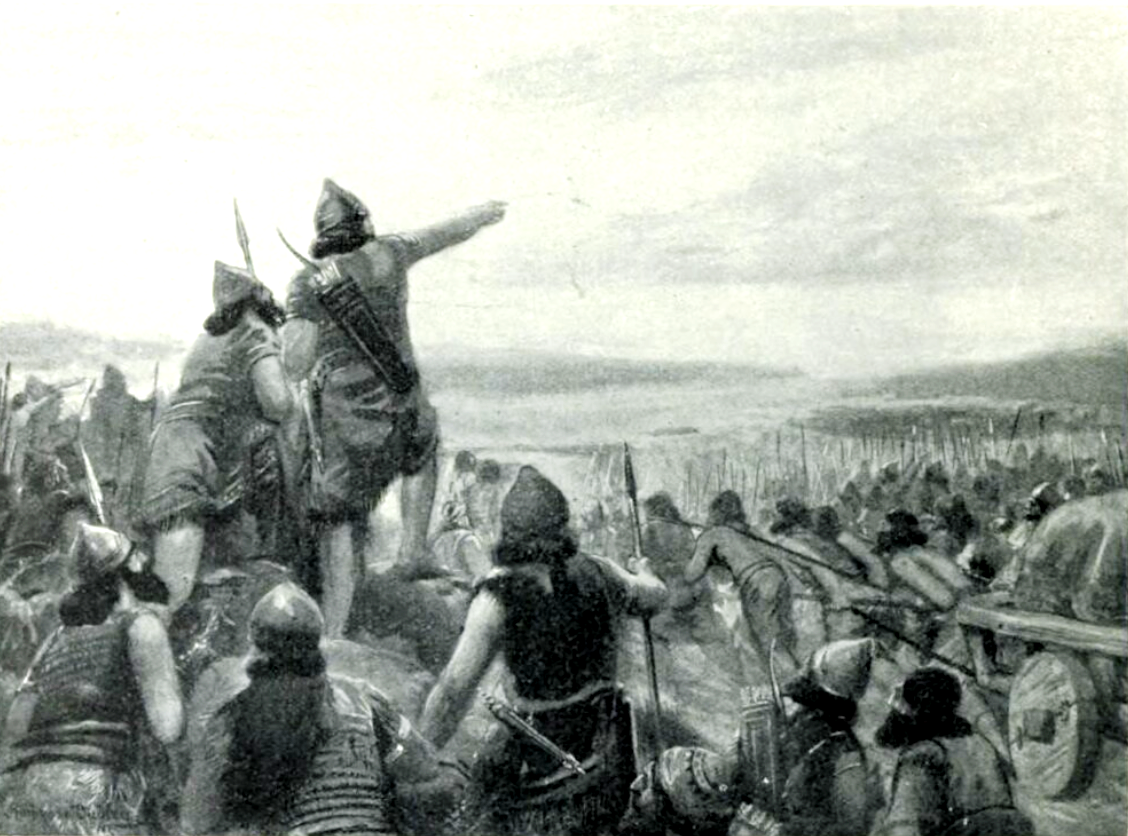
Shamshi-Adad I and his armies reach the Mediterranean Sea, as envisaged by A. C. Weatherstone

Shamshi-Adad I took over the long-abandoned town of Shekhna (today known as Tell Leilan), converted it into the capital city of Assyria, and then renamed it Šubat-Enlil (meaning "the residence of the god Enlil" in Akkadian) c. 1808 BC. During his reign, the Kingdom of Assyria competed for power in Lower Mesopotamia against: King Naram-Sin of Eshnunna, Naram-Sin's successors, and Yahdun-Lim of Mari. A main target for expansion was the city of Mari, which controlled the caravan route between Anatolia and Mesopotamia. Yahdun-Lim was assassinated by his own servants (possibly on Shamshi-Adad I's orders.) The heir to the throne of Mari, Zimri-Lim, was forced to flee to Yamhad. Shamshi-Adad I seized the opportunity and occupied Mari around 1796 BC. He placed his sons (Ishme-Dagan I and Yasmah-Adad) in key geographical locations and gave them responsibility to look over those areas. Shamshi-Adad I put his eldest son (Ishme-Dagan I) on the throne of Ekallatum, while Shamshi-Adad I remained in Šubat-Enlil. Shamshi-Adad I put his second son, Yasmah-Adad, on the throne in Mari. With the annexation of Mari, Shamshi-Adad I had carved out a large kingdom encompassing much of Syria, Anatolia, and the whole of Upper Mesopotamia (this kingdom often referred to as either the "Kingdom of Upper Mesopotamia" or the "Upper Mesopotamian Empire".) Shamshi-Adad I proclaimed himself as "King of the Universe" (the title had been used by Sargon of Akkad.)

==== Eshnunna (Kingdom) ====
Shamshi-Adad I was both allied to and enemy of the Kingdom of Eshnunna.

Around 1781 BC, King Dadusha of Eshnunna made an alliance with Shamshi-Adad I to conquer the area between the two Zab Rivers. This military campaign of joint forces was commemorated on a victory stele which states that Dadusha gave the lands to Shamshi-Adad I.

Shamshi-Adad I later turned against Dadusha by attacking cities including Shaduppum, Nerebtum, and Andarig. On inscriptions, Shamshi-Adad I boasts of erecting triumphal stelae on the coast of the Mediterranean Sea, but these probably represent short expeditions rather than any attempts at conquest. His campaigns were meticulously planned, and his army knew all the classic methods of siegecraft, such as encircling ramparts and battering rams.

Contemporary rulers of Eshnunna:

- Dadusha of Eshnunna
- Until Year-Name 5 of Ibal-pi-el II of Eshnunna

=== Fall ===
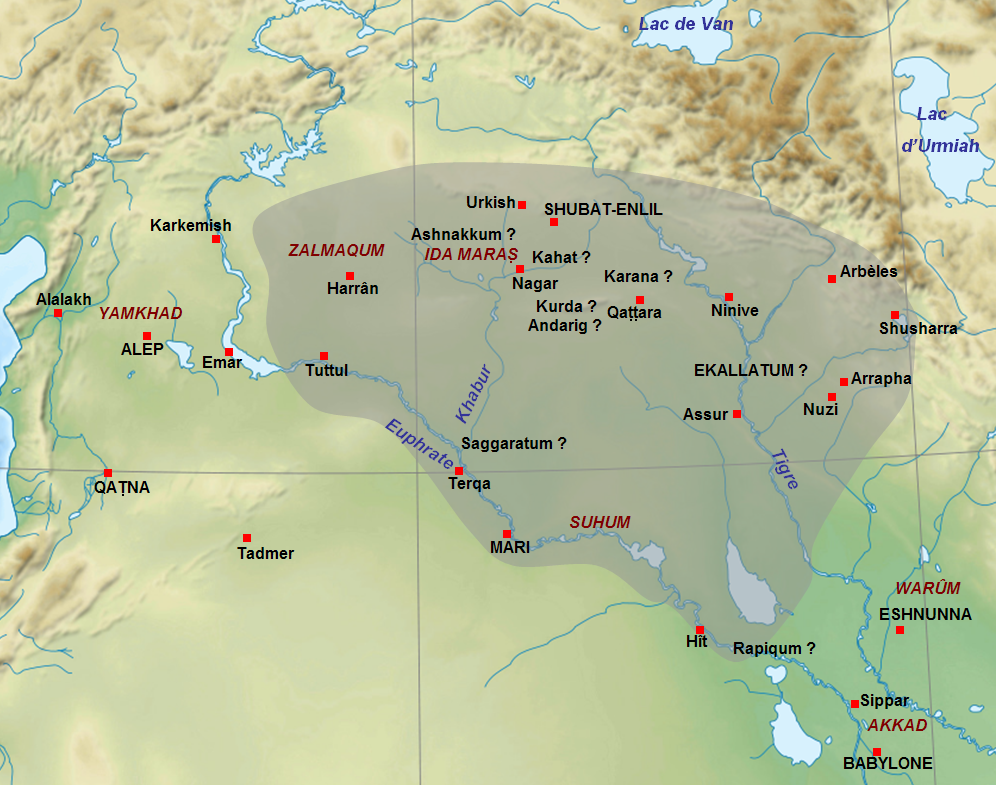
Approximate extent of the short-lived Kingdom of Upper Mesopotamia c. 1776 BC, at the end of Shamshi-Adad I's life.

Shamshi-Adad I continued to expand and strengthen his kingdom throughout his life. As the kingdom grew and he got older, the state became more vulnerable and the neighboring great powers Yamhad and Eshnunna began attacking. The kingdom lacked cohesion and was in a vulnerable geographical position. Naturally, Shamshi-Adad I's rise to glory earned him the envy of neighboring kings and tribes, and throughout his reign, he and his sons faced several threats to their control.

== Death ==
Shamshi-Adad I died around 1776 BC, Year 18 of Hammrabi of Babylon. The death is also known from Year-Name 5 of Ibal-pi-el II of Eshnunna.

=== Aftermath ===
After the death of Shamshi-Adad I around 1776 BC, Eshnunna captured cities around Assur. His old rivals set out to topple his sons from the throne. Yasmah-Adad was soon expelled from Mari by Zimri-Lim and the rest of the kingdom was eventually lost during the reigns of Ishme-Dagan I, first to a coalition of Mari, Andarig, and Eshnunna, then to another Amorite ruler, Hammurabi of Babylon.

== See also ==
- Chronology of the ancient Near East
- List of Mesopotamian deities
- List of Mesopotamian dynasties

== Sources ==
- OBO (Orbis Biblicus et Orientalis) 160/4
- Nelson, Glueck (1959). Rivers in the Desert. HUC.
- McNeil, William H.; Jean W. Sedlar (1962). The Ancient Near East. OUP.
- George, Andrew (2000). The Epic of Gilgamesh. Penguin. No14-044721-0.
- Pritchard, James B. (1968). The Ancient Near East. OUP. ISBN 0-691-03532-6.
- Al Khalifa, Shaika Haya Ali; Michael Rice (1986). Bahrain through the Ages. KPI. ISBN 0-7103-0112-X.
- Nayeem, Muhammed Abdul (1990). Prehistory and Protohistory of the Arabian Peninsula. Hyderabad.
- Roaf, Michael (1990). Cultural Atlas of Mesopotamia and the Ancient Near East. Equinox. ISBN 0-8160-2218-6.
- Awde, Nicholas; Putros Samano (1986). The Arabic Alphabet. Billing & Sons Ltd. ISBN 0-86356-035-0.
- Herm, Gerard (1975). The Phoenicians. William Morrow & Co. Inc. ISBN 0-688-02908-6.
- Pedersén, Olof (1998). Archives and Libraries in the Ancient Near East: 1500-300 B.C. Bethesda: CDL Press.
- Shiloh, Y. (1980). "The Population of Iron Age Palestine in the Light of a Sample Analysis of Urban Plans, Areas and Population Density". Bulletin of the American Schools of Oriental Research (239): 25–35. doi:10.2307/1356754. JSTOR 1356754. S2CID 163824693.
- Van De Mieroop, Marc (2004). A History of the Ancient Near East ca 3000-323 BC (2nd ed.). Malden: Blackwell Publishing. pp. 89, 99, 104, 106–11. ISBN 9781405149112.
- Chavalas, Mark W. (2006). The Ancient Near East: Historical Sources in Translation. Malden: Blackwell Publishing. pp. 93, 95–6, 103, 116, 102–3, 115–6, 118–20, 370. ISBN 0631235817.
- P. Villard, "Shamshi-Adad and Sons: The Rise of an Upper Mesopotamian Kingdom", in J. M. Sasson (ed.), Civilizations of the Ancient Near East, vol. II, Scribner, New York, 1995, p. 873-883

=== Further reading ===
- Wasserman, Nathan; Bloch, Yigal (2023). "The Kingdom of Samsī-Addu". The Amorites: A Political History of Mesopotamia in the Early Second Millennium BCE. Leyde et Boston: Brill. pp. 293–326.
- Ziegler, Nele (2006–2008). "Šamšī-Adad I". Reallexikon der Assyriologie und Voderasiatischen Archaölogie (in German). Vol. XI. pp. 632–635.
