= Zab River =

Zab River may refer to:

- Great Zab, or Upper Zab, a tributary to the Tigris
- Little Zab, or Lower Zab, a tributary to the Tigris
