= Ekallatum =

Amorite ancient city-state and kingdom in upper Mesopotamia

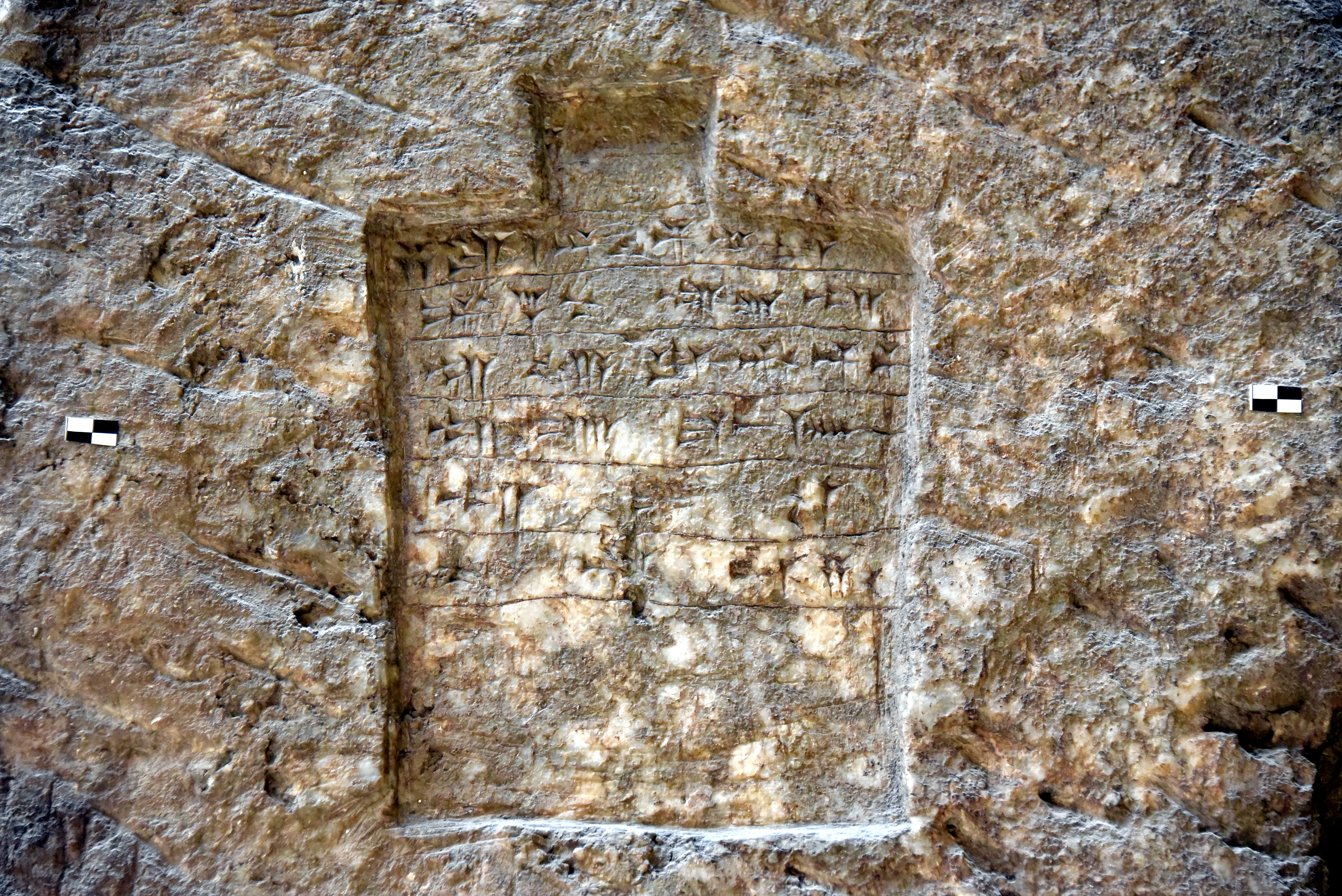
Stele of Adad-bel ukin, governor of Libbi-ali, Kar-Tukulti-Ninurta, Ekallatum, Itu, and Ruqahu. From Assur, Iraq. 780 BCE. Pergamon Museum

Ekallatum (Akkadian: 𒌷𒂍𒃲𒈨𒌍, ^{URU}E_{2}.GAL.MEŠ, Ekallātum, "the Palaces") was an ancient Amorite city-state and kingdom in upper Mesopotamia. Ekallatum, whose name means "the palaces," became the capital of an Amorite dynasty related to Babylon, which was important in the 19th and 18th centuries BCE period. The history of upper Mesopotamia in this period is documented in the archives of Mari, Syria. It was known to have been on the Tigris river, though which bank is still in some dispute, and in the general vicinity of Assur. It is generally considered to be the same city as the Ekallate of Neo-Assyrian times.

The gods of the city were Addu (Hadad), who resided in Ekallātum, and Istar of Radana, who visited the city from time to time. In a letter between Zimri-Lim, ruler of Mari and his diviner:

"To my lord speak! Your servant Ašqudum (says), “⸢According⸣ to the letter of ⸢my lord⸣, I made extispicies for Šattam-Kiazi. The extispicies that I made indicate the hand of Eštar Radan of Ekallatum. The goddess urges her about her trip to Ekallatum. Unless she goes to Ekallatum, her illness will not go out (from her).”"

== History ==
Its first known king was the Amorite Ila-kabkabu, who seems to have entered into a conflict with Iagitlim of Mari. His son Shamshi-Adad I ascended to the throne c. 1800 BC, continuing the conflict and attempting to extend into the valley along the Khabur River. He was a sometime ally, sometime enemy of Dadusha of Eshnunna (whose second year name was "Year in which Dadusza defeated the army of Ekallatum") in regional conflicts. His expansion was halted by Iagitlim's son, Iakhdunlim, and he was soon after defeated by Naram-Sin of Eshnunna, brother and successor of Dadusha, which caused him to flee to Babylon, a city founded and ruled by fellow Amorites. He returned upon Naram-Sin's death. Soon thereafter, a series of military victories by Shamshi-Adad followed, and he seized all of Upper Mesopotamia, founding what historians now call the Kingdom of Upper Mesopotamia. The campaign included the annexing of nearby Assur. He founded his own capital at Shubat-Enlil, entrusting Ekallatum to his elder son Ishme-Dagan I. (His other son, Yasmah-Adad, was placed on the throne of Mari at the time.) Ishme-Dagan appears to have been a capable military leader, but when his father died in around 1775, he proved unable to maintain the whole kingdom; nonetheless, he kept Ekallatum, while his brother lost Mari and was killed.

The reign of Ishme-Dagan was chaotic, often being involved in military conflict with Nurrugum (location unknown). Unable to restore power to the city despite his many attempts, he was the target of nearby warlords, in particular, Zimrilim of Mari. When the Elamites took Ekallatum in 1765, he sought refuge with his traditional ally -- Hammurabi of Babylon—who helped him take back the throne. His time at Babylon may have been more in the way of captive than ally given:

"About the news on Išme-Dagan coming up to Ekallatum that my lord keeps hearing: he certainly did not [go up] to Ekallatum. Matters concerning him have happened, and they (people in Babylon?) started getting after him. The respondent (āpilum) of the god Marduk stood in the gate of the palace and was calling out repeatedly: “Išme-Dagan will not escape the hand of Marduk. He (Marduk) ties the bundle. And he will cross the border for it.” These things he called out repeatedly in the gate of the palace, and nobody said anything to him"

Subsequently, Ekallatum became a vassal city subservient to the king of Babylon Hammurabi (a year name was "Year Hammu-rabi the king subjugated the land of the region of Subartu, Ekallatum, Burunda and the land of Zamlasz from the banks of the Tigris to the Sippar canal"), who came to control all of Mesopotamia. With the death of Ishme-Dagan. He was the last known king of Ekallatum as well as being king of Assyria. Later Ekallātum was incorporated into Assyria after the Amorite rulers were ousted from Assur in the latter third of the 18th century BC. it was sacked by the Hittites under Šuppiluliuma I (1344–1322 BC) during the Hittite Empire's ultimately unsuccessful campaign against the Middle Assyrian Empire.

An inscription claims that the king of Babylon Marduk-nadin-ahhe (c. 1095–1078 BC) captured Ekallātum from Assyria.

The Neo-Assyrian ruler Sennacherib (705–681 BC) reported that he returned the gods (their cult statues) "Adad and Shala" to Ekallātum after 418 years, claiming they had been deported by Babylonian ruler Marduk-nadin-ahhe (c. 1095–1078 BC).

== Location ==
It was speculated by one researcher that the original name of Ekallātum was Hamazi, changed after it was destroyed by Ishbi-Erra of Isin after the fall of the Ur III empire.

An Ekallātum is mentioned in the Old Babylonian period texts of Mari as lying to the West of the Tigris River in the Khābūr Tringle Region. One prominent researcher has suggested that the Mari texts contain two towns named Ekallātum, one on the Tigris and one which was Shamsi-Adad's capital at the headwater of a tributary of the Khabur River at the modern location of "Khoueïltla".

In a long Old Babylonian itinerary from Emar and back (portions on the tablet are lost), Ekallātum is the first stop on the northward route after Assur and the last stop before Assur on the return route.

A tablet fragment was found at Tel Hazor (Hazor 16803) which listed an expected trade path from Hazor to Mari and then on to Ekallatum. An alternate reading of the text is "Once my hand has taken Mari, I intend to go to the interior of Ekallatum to perform sacrifices and celebrations".

It has been suggested that Ekallatum lies within a days journey of Assur, most likely at Tell Haikal (Tulul el-Haikal) (East: 43.272797 / North: 35.597384), 15 kilometers north of Assur on the East bank of the Tigris. More recently some researchers have discounted this location and instead suggested Tell Akra twenty kilometers east of Assur, also on the East bank of the Tigris.

Recently, the site of Tell Ḥuwaish (also Tal al-Huwaish), 18 kilometers north of Assur on the west bank of the Tigris, has been proposed as the location of Ekallātum.

== See also ==
- Cities of the ancient Near East
- List of Mesopotamian dynasties
