= Naram-Sin of Eshnunna =

King of Eshnunna (r. 1810–1001 BC)

Naram-Sin Narām-Sîn

King of Eshnunna
- Reign: c. 1818 - c. 1809 BC
- Predecessor: Ipiq-Adad II
- Died: c. 1809 BC
- Father: Ipiq-Adad II

Naram-Sin (died c. 1809 BC) was the King of Eshnunna for at least nine years, during its brief time of political power.

== Early life ==
He is known to be the son of Ipiq-Adad II, king of Eshnunna.

== Reign ==
He succeeded his father on the throne and reigned around 1818-1809 BC.

=== Shamshi-Adad ===
He was contemporary of Shamshi-Adad I, the future king of the Kingdom of Upper Mesopotamia. Shamshi-Adad was apparently ousted from his city by Naram-Sin which led to a brief exile in Babylon.

=== Military campaigns ===
He continued the expansion of Eshnunna begun by his father, Ipiq-Adad II. He raided the Khabur triangle up to Ašnakkum.

An inscription praying for the king's peace was found in Kythira.

=== Year-Names ===
Some 11 year-names have survived.

Year-Names
| Year | Regnal Year | Event |
|---|---|---|
| 18xx | 1 | Naram-Sin (became king); Year in which Naram-Sin ascended the throne in the house of his father |
| 18xx | 2 | (The land of) Asznakkum was seized, the land of Asznakkum and the city of Tarnip were seized |
| 18xx | 3 | Naram-Sin seized Kakkulatum |
| 18xx | 4 | Year after the year in which he seized Kakkulatum |
| 18xx | 5 | Year a dragon, year in which Naram-Sin brought to the ruddy gates 2 dragons in copper, Naram-Sin placed at the ruddy gates dragons |
| 18xx | 6 | Asztabala was seized |
| 18xx | 7 | Naram-Sin the king broke all the tablets (of debts) |
| 18xx | 8 | Naram-Sin brought in the temple of Tiszpak a statue in gold representing himself, statue in gold representing Naram-Sin |
| 18xx | 9 | Naram-Sin brought (into the temple) a decorated unrivalled chariot |
| 18xx | 10 | Life of Naram-Sin were brought in (see Uruk year names) |
| 18xx | 11 | 2 statues in gold and 2 statues in silver (representing) Naram-Sin were brought into the temple of Nin-azu |

== See also ==
- Naram-Sin of Akkad
- Naram-Sin of Assyria
