= Shibtu =

Queen of Mari

Queen consort of Mari
- Tenure: c. 1775 – c. 1761 BC
- King: Zimri-Lim
- Died: c. 1761 BC
- Spouse: Zimri-Lim
- Issue: at least 1 daughter and 1 son (twins)
- Father: Yarim-Lim I
- Mother: Gashera

Shibtu or Shibtum (Šībtum, also spelled Shiptu(m); in Amorite language “the Old One,” perhaps meaning “the Eldest”) was the main wife of King Zimri-Lim and the main queen of Mari, an ancient city in present-day Syria, from approximately 1773 to 1761 BC. She is well documented in the archives found in the Royal Palace of Mari, making her the best-known queen of the Old Babylonian period (ca. 2000–1600 BCE) and, more generally, one of the best documented queens of the ancient Near East.

A princess of the mighty Kingdom of Yamhad, whose capital was Aleppo, she became the wife of the king of Mari following his alliance with her father, Yarim-Lim I. Initially serving as a secondary queen in her husband’s harem, she subsequently became the true mistress of the royal household. She was then entrusted with significant responsibilities, notably ensuring the running of the royal household when her husband was absent from the capital, as well as overseeing ritual matters. However, she remained in a subordinate position, with little autonomy, that required her to report on her activities to her husband in detail and to await his orders before making important decisions, as evidenced by her correspondence.

== A Princess from Aleppo ==
Shibtu was born into the royal family of the Kingdom of Yamhad, whose capital was Aleppo. It was one of the most powerful kingdoms in the Near East during the first half of the 18th century BC. She was the daughter of King Yarim-Lim and his main wife, Queen Gashera. Her brother Hammurabi became king after their father’s death.

Ancestors of Shibtu

Sumu-Epuh
Yarim-Lim I
Sumunna-Abi
Shibtu
Gashera

== Marriage to Zimri-Lim of Mari ==
Zimri-Lim, nephew or grandson of King Yahdun-Lim of Mari, was forced to flee the kingdom of Mari when his dynasty was ousted by King Samsi-Addu of Ekallatum, who installed his son Yasmah-Addu in the city. Zimri-Lim took refuge with his tribe in a territory under the control of King Yarim-Lim I of Yamhad, and about fifteen years later he recaptured Mari with the latter’s support. Once on the throne, Zimri-Lim was forced to choose the protection of a major ruler: either the king of Yamhad, his western neighbor, or the king of Eshnunna, his eastern neighbor. He chose the former, with whom he evidently had closer ties. As was often the case, this alliance was cemented by a marriage, as Yarim-Lim gave his daughter Shibtu in marriage to Zimri-Lim. The wedding took place in the second year of Zimri-Lim’s reign (ca. 1773 BC).

The details of this marriage are well documented in a collection of letters. The diviner Asqudum and the head musician Rishiya led the embassy sent from Mari to Aleppo for the negotiations and to accompany the procession bringing the bride back to Mari. In particular, negotiations focused on the dowry (nidittum) given to Shibtu when she left her family, and the counter-dowry (terhatum) received in exchange by the family. The tablet listing the contents of the latter has been found, albeit in a fragmentary state: it included jewelry, luxury tableware, clothing, and livestock. A wedding gift (biblum) was also presented by the future husband to his in-laws. The marriage rite was performed by proxy: since the king does not travel to Aleppo, his envoys placed the veil on the bride, thereby sealing the union. The departure for Mari was, however, postponed by the death of Sumun-na-abi, the mother of the king of Aleppo. A letter indicates that the envoys from Mari spent their time touring the kingdom and offering new gifts to the royal family:

When Lady Sumunna-abi died, Yarim-Lim told us, “Until this commemoration (ḫidirtum) runs its course, go (both of you) and make a tour of my country’s heartland.” For fifteen days, we traversed his country’s heartland and headed back. Since we have come back, I have made ready the sheep that were previously assigned for the sacrifices of the young woman and the remaining sheep that were left in my charge [when traveling]. There were also:

For Yarim-Lim: 1 gold ring of 6 šekels; 1 heavy-textured fabric, 1 first-quality rough-woven fabric; 5 second-quality rough-woven fabrics; 21 second-quality “straight”-woven fabrics; 200 tišanum-sheep, fat-tailed sheep, and birds. For Gašera: 1 finely-woven fabric; 2 gold clasps of 2 šekels (each); 2 gold clasps of 1 šekel (each); and [1]20 sheep. For the daughter, Šibtu: 1 Marad-fabric; 2 gold clasps weighing 2 šekels.

This later presentation, much as the previous one, was (deemed) sufficient. As to Yarim-Lim, beaming he told me, “Your previous presentation, what should I do (with it)? There has never been (such a display) from any of the kings, (even) now that the kings of the entire country are assembled.” For this reason Yarim-Lim is extremely pleased. Moreover, after the donkey sacrifice I shall insist on our leaving promptly. The decision is taken.

The new queen arrived in Mari in the sixth month of the second year of Zimri-Lim’s reign. The inscription on her cylinder seal (known from a handful of impressions on clay tablets), identifying her through her father and husband, records her origins and marriage: “Shibtu, daughter of Yarim-Lim, wife of Zimri-Lim”.

Shibtu and Zimri-Lim had at least two children, as there is a letter in which the queen announces the birth of twins to the king:

I gave birth to twins, a boy and a girl. My lord should be pleased.

These twins may have been the children named Hadni-Addu (who bears the name of Zimri-Lim’s father) and Shubultum, who are listed alongside Shibtu in ration lists found in the Small Eastern Palace of Mari, when she was not residing in the main royal palace.

== The main Queen of Mari ==
When Shibtu arrived in Mari, her husband already had several wives and numerous concubines. In particular, he had a main wife and queen, Dam-hurasim, who was apparently the daughter of the king of Qatna, a ruler of the first rank, just like Shibtu’s father. She thus arrived in a secondary position, but she seems to have gradually risen to the top rank. The death of Queen Mother Addu-duri, who had held an important position, put her in a position to assume a more significant role in the affairs of the kingdom, likely after a period of training. For most of the reign, the correspondence indicates that the dominant role was played by Shibtu, who held an important position in the administration of the women’s quarters (the king’s “harem”), in the palace economy, and also in cult, and who was assigned the largest number of maidservants. In principle, Dam-hurasim should have held primacy due to her seniority and her status as the mother of the heir apparent. But this appears to be largely honorary, since in practice she does not seem to have been involved in the affairs of the kingdom. This situation is reflected in the fact that both women can be referred to by the title “Lady,” bēltum, which is normally reserved for the most important royal consort.

Once she rose to the first position following the death of Queen Mother Addu-duri, Shibtu became the primary recipient of letters sent by the king when he was away from Mari. She did not accompany him on his travels, particularly during times of conflict, but remained at the palace to manage the king’s household and perform duties related to religious cult. She also corresponded with other high-ranking officials and important figures to ensure the proper running of affairs. This is why so much is known about her, making her one of the best-known queens of the ancient Near East.

The king kept her informed of the progress of military operations, as in this instance when he went to war in the northern part of the kingdom:

I have defeated the enemy who stood in my way, from the gate of Ašnakkum to Sabbanum; he was unable to make a sortie.Susu, king of the land of Apum, Šawališ, the commander-in-chief, and all the military servants of Eluhut were there. I joined them. Rejoice! Furthermore, share the good news with your palace.

In another letter, it is Yataraya, the wife of Zimri-Lim who usually accompanies him on his travels, who informs Shibtu about the king’s journey; the letter’s address clearly indicates the Shibtu’s preeminence over Yataraya:

Tell my Queen: Thus speaks Yataraya, your servant.
My Lord is in good health; the armies and the servants are in good health. May the Lady of the Palace (a goddess) grant my Queen a long life, for my sake! May news of my Queen’s health reach me constantly! I am very attentive to news of my Queen’s health!
I will send my Queen any news I learn after sending this tablet.
On the day I am sending you this tablet, the King has paid tribute to my Lord; he has granted freedom to the palace of Ilan-ṣura.

For her part, Shibtu provided Zimri-Lim detailed reports on the palace and the kingdom, as well as her activities, and asks for news, for example:

The palace is in good order, as are the temples and the workshops. I have had omens taken about the well-being of my lord through this month. The omens for my lord’s well-being are favorable. My lord ought to protect himself from sun-stroke. The omen is set and my lord should act in accordance with God’s command. So, if anyone among kings speaks frankly with my lord, he would be speaking deceptively with my lord.

Several letters with a more personal tone also shed light on moments of intimacy. One letter thus indicates that Shibtum is sending the king garments she has made.

This does not imply that Shibtu was permanently confined to one of the palaces of Mari. Several of her trips, ordered by the king, are attested in the texts. She traveled at least once to the town of Hishamta to make a sacrifice. She went at least twice to the provincial city of Saggaratum (one time to join her husband who wa already there). She also visited Terqa, again with the king.

== Residences and assets ==
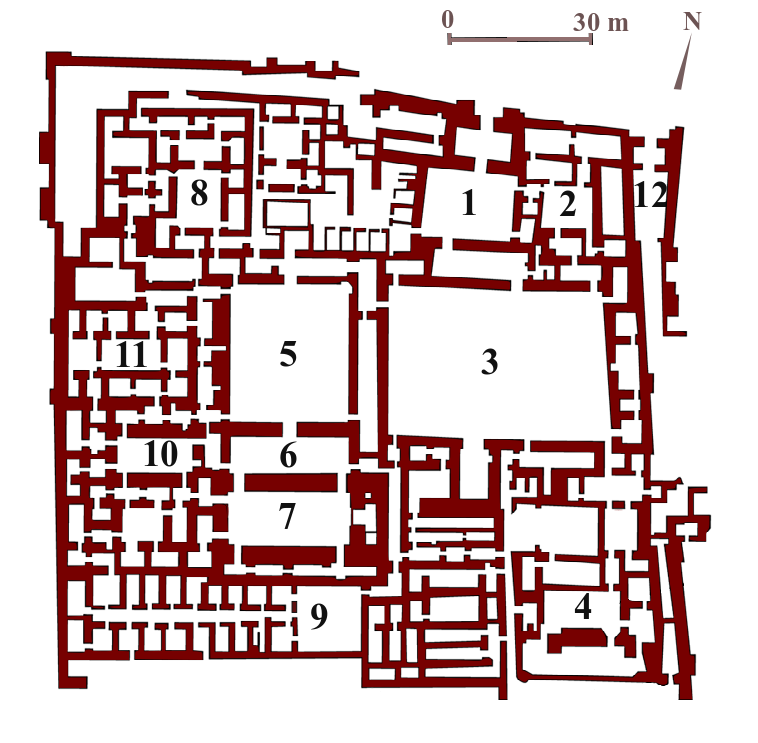
Plan of the Royal Palace of Mari during the reign of Zimri-Lim. 1. entrance courtyard 2. steward’s quarters (bīt tertim) 3. courtyard of the painted building 4. temple of the "Lady of the Palace" 5. palm tree courtyard 6. vestibule (papahum) 7. Throne Room 8. "Harem," Women’s Quarters 9. Servants’ Quarters 10. Kitchens 11. Administrative Section of the Harem 12. Gate of Nergal.

The question of Shibtu’s residence was raised during the negotiations preceding her wedding. A letter from Asqudum, one of the emissaries of the king of Mari sent to Aleppo to finalize the union, recounts a conversation with Yarim-Lim regarding his daughter’s residence, which is difficult to interpret. We learn in particular that if she is to reside in the palace, a house will be prepared for Shibtu upon her arrival in Mari, within the city (the former residence of Mut-Bisir, who was a military commander of Mari before Zimri-Lim took power). According to the most widely accepted interpretation, it was decided that she would reside there periodically when she had to be away from the palace for a few days, apparently during her menstrual period. This seems to be linked to the sacred nature of a section of the royal palace, that included a sanctuary within it, implying that women must stay away from it when they were considered to be in a state of “impurity.”

Yarim-Lim addressed [me] as follows: ‘I kept hearing, “The gods in the palace are strong.” Where will the household goods of my daughter enter?’ I (said), ‘The apartments of your daughter are good.’ He (said), ‘The effects of my daughter must be placed in her apartments. My daughter may stay with her husband! And in 5 days, in 6 days, she may leave, and she may concern herself with her apartments!’ Now my lord must give instructions and select the apartments. They must tidy them up for his daughter, so that his servants, who come with me, see and return word to their lord.

Documents from the Mari archives indicate that Shibtu resided most of the time in the great royal palace, in addition to having her own house in Mari, where some of her maidservants lived. At least during the second half of the reign, she lived in the northwestern part of the building, which served as the women’s quarters. Tablets containing her correspondence were found in rooms in this part of the palace. Administrative tablets include the “queen’s meals,” recording the moves of foodstuffs from palace storerooms for Shibtu’s table.

She also resided for a time in the “Small Eastern Palace,” a secondary palace located in Mari, that has been excavated. Her presence there is attested by administrative tablets (most of them recording meals) from the 11th year of Zimri-Lim’s reign, along with Hadni-Addu and Shubultum, who were likely her son and daughter. The reason for this change of residence, which also affected other women in the palace, remains unclear (perhaps a lack of space in the main palace?). She returned to live in the Great Royal Palace in the year.

In addition to her house or houses in Mari, the queen owned estates (on which she paid taxes) and financial assets that she could manage as she saw fit. She was involved in transactions, received and sent gifts, and made loans.

== The Lady of the house ==
Shibtu's administrative and economic role involved managing the affairs of the palace, including its staff, stores, and estates. The “Palace” is understood here as a “house(hold)” in the broadest sense, that is, not only the residence of the king and his family (bearing in mind that he actually had several palaces throughout his kingdom), but also the entire group of people and assets (land, animals, property) under his authority. Significantly, Shibtu’s letters addressed to the king often begin with a phrase such as “The Palace is well,” indicating that this was her sphere of responsibility. She acted, in a sense, as the "lady of the house," a liaison for the head of the household when he is absent. She apparently possessed a seal that allowed her to seal documents and containers in her capacity as administrator, in addition to her private seal, which she used to seal her personal correspondence.

Her letters with Zimri-Lim thus includes detailed reports on the economic affairs under her charge. This shows that she was clearly subordinate to her husband regarding the management of the palace’s assets. She did not act without his written orders, as in this instance concerning gold that the palace steward, Mukannishum, demanded of her:

Mukannišum arrived and said this to me: ‘This gold has been allocated to me.’ I replied to him as follows: ‘Until a tablet from my Lord arrives, I will not hand over the gold.’ Has the gold been assigned to Mukannišum? Let a tablet from my Lord come if I am to hand over (this) gold.

Several letters document her activities in the palace storerooms on the king’s orders, such as this one in which he asked her to draw and prepare wine to offer to Hammurabi of Babylon:

Hammurabi, king of Babylon, has written me for wine. I am now conveying to you a cylinder-seal in a (metal) mounting. Open up the wine stockroom with Ṣidqummaṣi standing by, let him purify his hands, then select 11 jars of red (sāmum) wine of good quality that I drink. Mix it in one vat, fill up 10 jars of red wine, seal (them) with this seal, and give them to Baḫdi-Lim. Then convey to me 1 jar of the red wine that you are mixing, sending it upstream. Do send (back) to me the seal with (metal) mount. (The merchant) Kutkutum has brought me 60 jars of second-quality wine. Another matter: Do convey via the Babylonian messengers first-rate wine.

She had maidservants specifically assigned to her, identified by ration distribution lists. Their number increased over time, a sign of their mistress’s growing influence: six or seven upon her arrival at the palace (part of her dowry?), then eighteen toward the end of Zimri-Lim. She may have obtained more through gifts from the king, her own purchases, or the reassignment of palace staff.

As queen, she played a role in managing the female population of the king's household, which constituted nearly the entire palace staff, including the king’s wives and concubines, his unmarried daughters and sisters, the “musicians” (many of whom were likely concubines), as well as numerous female servants (housekeepers, scribes, maids, and kitchen staff). However, it does not appear that she was strictly speaking in charge of all this staff, who may also have reported to other officials. Several letters indicate that she oversaw the transportation of people, notably musicians and prisoners of war assigned to the king’s household, which seems to suggest that she played a role in managing the harem.

Several letters concern the management of female prisoners of war following a campaign in the land of Ashlakka toward the end of Zimri-Lim’s reign. In one of them, the king asked the queen to select, with the help of the head musician, those who would join his harem to become weavers or musicians:

I have just directed to you female weavers, among whom there are ugbabtum-priestesses. Pick out the ugbabtum-priestesses and assign them to a weaving establishment. Among these female weavers and among those previous as well, select thirty—or as many as there are worth selecting—attractive female weavers who show no blemish from toenail to head hair and assign them to Warad-ilišu (head musician). Warad-ilišu ought to teach them Subarean choir-music. Their dwelling, however, ought to be moved. Be careful with their food-rations so that their looks will not change. When you make your selection, Warad-ilišu should attend. Moreover, alert Mukannišum so that the looks of the other female weavers that you assign to him should not deteriorate.

Some letters document her handling of an epidemic that broke out in the palace, providing instructive insight into the management of such situations in ancient Mesopotamia; here Zimri-Lim gave instructions to his wife:

I have heard “Nanna has an infection (simmum).” Since she is often at the palace, it will infect the many women who are with her. Now give strict orders: No one is to drink from the cup she uses; no one is to sit on the seat she takes; no one is to lie on the bed she uses, lest it infect the many women who are with her. This is a very contagious infection!

== Religious affairs ==
Shibtu played a particularly active role in the management of religious affairs, in which the women of the king’s household were often were often entrusted with an important position (notably the queen mother at the beginning of Zimri-Lim). This is evident from administrative texts recording deliveries of goods, as well as from a few letters.

The queen made votive offerings to the gods. On at least two occasions, she gave presents to the goddess Ishtar of Tuba, in her homeland.

She took part in divination, which played a political role, essential to the conduct of the kingdom's affairs, insofar as it conveyed divine directives to the sovereign. She reported oracular dreams and prophecies delivered in the sanctuaries of some of the great Syrian gods, which were of great importance to the king; for example:

In the house of (the goddess) Annunitum, on the third day (of the month), Selebum went ecstatic. Annunitum (says), ‘Zimri-Lim, they will test you in a rebellion. Guard yourself! Surround yourself with the servants, your agents, whom you love! Let them stand (before you), and let them protect you! Do not go by yourself! And the men who test you, those men I will hand over to you.’

Other letters indicate that she was responsible for conducting oracular consultations, particularly using the entrails of lambs (hepatoscopy, extispicy), at the king’s request when he was away, as in this case concerning Hammurabi of Babylon:

Now ask about the Babylonian Hammurabi. Will that man die? Does he talk forthrightly with us? Will he wage war against us? Will he come up, and will he besiege us? How? Ask about that man! When you have asked once, turn around, ask a second time! The message concerning him, whatever you ask, write (it) to me!”

The answer to this question may have been found in this letter sent by Shibtu to Zimri-Lim, which (wrongly) predicted that Hammurabi would never prevail over Mari:

[About] the news from Babylon I gave signs to drink. I asked, and that man (Hammurabi) thinks up many things about this land. He will not succeed. My lord will see what the god will do to that man. You will catch him. And you will stand over him. His days are near. He will not live. This my lord must know.

== After the fall of Mari ==
Mari was taken in 1761 BC by the Babylonian troops of King Hammurabi, bringing an end to Zimri-Lim’s reign. The city was captured, the palace was looted and then destroyed, never to be occupied again. Both the king and Shibtu then disappear from the historical record, so their fate during this turbulent period remains unknown. A tablet listing Shibtum’s dowry, which also mentions the name of a vassal of Zimri-Lim, the Rabbean king Dadi-hadun, may date from the end of Zimri-Lim’s reign: according to an analysis by J.-M. Durand based on other tablets, Zimri-Lim may have died before the city’s fall, and Shibtu would then have either fled to her homeland, Aleppo, with her dowry, or been remarried to Dadi-hadun.
