= Zimri-Lim =

King of Mari, Syria (c. 18th century BC)

King of Mari
- Reign: c. 1775 – c. 1760 BC
- Predecessor: Ishar-Lim
- Successor: Position abolished
- Died: c. 1760 BC
- Spouse: Dam-hurasim; Shibtu
- Issue: 8 daughters

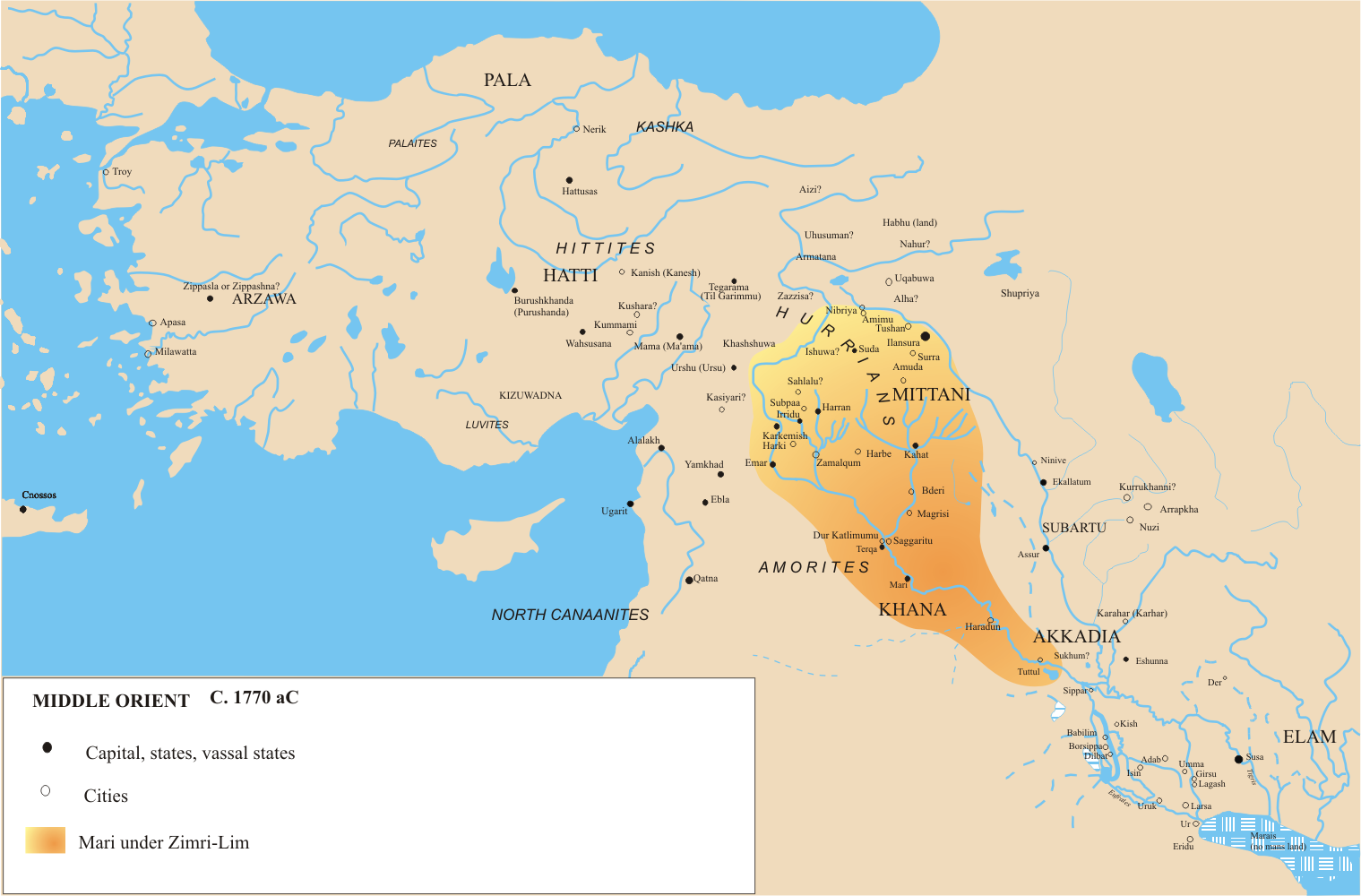
Mari territory under Zimri-Lim c. 1767 BC

Zimri-Lim was the last king of Mari. He reigned from ca. 1775 to 1761 BC. His reign, known through the extensive archives of the Royal Palace of Mari, is one of the best-documented in ancient history.

He was a member of the family of the previous king of Mari, Yahdun-Lim (ca. 1810–1794 BC; presumably his grandfather or his uncle). He was forced into exile under the protection of the king of Aleppo when his line was ousted from Mari by the king Samsi-Addu (Or Shamshi-Adad). After the latter’s death, Zimri-Lim seized Mari and became its king. After resisting Eshnunna and quelling the revolt of the Benjaminite tribes, he succeeded in consolidating his power and becoming one of the leading kings of the Near East. He extended his authority over most of Upper Mesopotamia—the lands north and east of the Euphrates and in the Khabur region—which were then divided into several small, unstable kingdoms. He allied himself with Hammurabi of Babylon to lead a coalition that repelled an attempted invasion of Mesopotamia by Elam in 1765 BC. Nevertheless, in the years that followed, he faced the growing ambitions of the Babylonian king, to whom he eventually fell victim. He likely died during the capture of Mari in 1761 BC, which preceded the city’s destruction.

The royal archives of Mari provide a great wealth of information on the reign of Zimri-Lim. He ruler over a dual political entity, as he was both king of Mari and the surrounding territories and leader of the Bensimalite tribes, some of whom lived as nomads outside his territory while still recognizing his authority. Like other kings of his era, he was a warlord whose troops were constantly on a war footing due to the turbulent political climate of his time, which left him virtually no respite. He was very active diplomatically, pursuing a policy of alliances aimed at strengthening his power, which notably involved marrying several of his daughters to his vassals. He was also considered the chosen one of the gods of his lands, which led him, in particular, to consult oracles frequently and to keep up to date with the prophecies concerning him, in order to know the divine will. His palace was the heart of his kingdom’s administration, which relied on his close servants as well as a large female staff, led by Queen Shibtu, a native of the powerful kingdom of Aleppo, who played a major role in managing the king’s household. The palace included numerous storerooms, documented by archaeological evidence and administrative texts that provide a lot of information about the material life of a royal court during this period—for example, for example, the foods served at the king’s meals and the luxury tableware kept under strict surveillance.

== Name ==
The name Zimri-Lim is in the Amorite language (Zimrī-Lîm), and means "the tribe is my help" or "the tribe is my strength." The second term means "tribe," probably liʾmum in the nominative case, here in the absolute state liʾim (or lîm). It is found in the name of the other kings of his dynasty, Yaggid-Lim and Yahdun-Lim, who have therefore been somewhat hastily called "the Lim dynasty" (the term is also found in the name of the contemporary Yarim-Lim I of Aleppo, who belongs to a different Amorite tribe).

== Sources ==
The reign of Zimri-Lim is primarily documented by archives found at various points within the Royal Palace of Mari. These are texts written in cuneiform script, on clay tablets, that were left behind by the Babylonian conquerors when they captured the city and looted the palace at the end of Zimri Lim's reign (although they did take with them the texts they considered more important). They number in the thousands, are not published in their entirety, and are essentially divided into two main categories. First, there are administrative texts documenting the management of the king's household, primarily tablets recording the inflow and outflow of goods. These include records of food supplies for the royal table (the "king's meals"), rations distributed to palace staff, gifts presented to messengers and foreign courts, inventories of goods stored in the palace (particularly precious objects and raw materials), lists of fields belonging to the royal domain, tax documents, lists of palace workers and deported prisoners of war, and so on. Other administrative texts document the administration of the provinces, including censuses for military purposes and gifts presented by local dignitaries to the king. The fact that these texts are often dated allows them to be used to reconstruct political history. The letters from the royal archives of Mari constitute the most studied and prominent documentation within this corpus. It includes the king's correspondence with his subordinates stationed in the provinces or on missions abroad, as well as the part of his diplomatic correspondence that the Babylonians did not take (they evidently seized the letters sent by the most powerful kings, beginning with that of their own king, Hammurabi). An important collection of letters is the women's correspondence, letters sent by palace women to the king or others. The palatial archives also yielded legal, ritual, scholastic, and literary texts, notably the "Epic of Zimri-Lim," an epic poem glorifying the king.

Very few commemorative inscriptions issued by Zimri-Lim are known. His year names, celebrating the memorable events of his reign, primarily pious deeds (e.g., 10th year: "Year: Zimri-Lim offered a great throne to the god Addu of Mahanum") and military victories (e.g., 4th year: "Year: Zimri-Lim captured Ashlakka"), are essential for reconstructing the relative chronology of his reign and knowing some of the most significant events.

Texts dating from the time of Zimri-Lim, but excavated outside Mari, complement the former. Unpublished administrative tablets were notably discovered at Tell Ashara (ancient Terqa). Three letters written by the king of Mari were also discovered at Tell Rimah (Qattara), outside his kingdom.

The non-written sources consist of images, particularly those engraved on cylinder seals found, or their impressions on clay tablets, as well as fragments of paintings from the Royal Palace of Mari. The study of archaeological remains, especially those of the Royal Palace of Mari, also provides valuable information on the Zimri-Lim period.

== Life and Reign ==
Location of the main sites in Mesopotamia and Syria dating from the Old Babylonian period.

=== Background ===
Zimri-Lim's reign took place during the period known as the “Old Babylonian” period, which spans from 2004 to 1595 BC according to the Middle Chronology, the chronology most commonly used by historians specializing in this period. This era is sometimes also called the "Amorite period," because the dynasties that ruled Mesopotamia and Syria at that time were predominantly of Amorite origin (a people speaking a West Semitic language), and this was the case of Zimri-Lim’s dynasty. Syria and Mesopotamia in the late 19th and early 18th centuries were divided into several kingdoms, the most powerful of which—alongside Mari—were those with capitals located in Larsa, Babylon, Eshnunna, Aleppo (Yamhad), and Qatna. Upper Mesopotamia was politically very unstable: no major power was able to establish lasting dominance there, and a myriad of small principalities divided the territory among themselves, with rapid-fire civil wars and coups d’état, accompanied by purges and large-scale population displacements, given that the kings who established themselves in the cities often exercised power over highly mobile semi-nomadic groups.

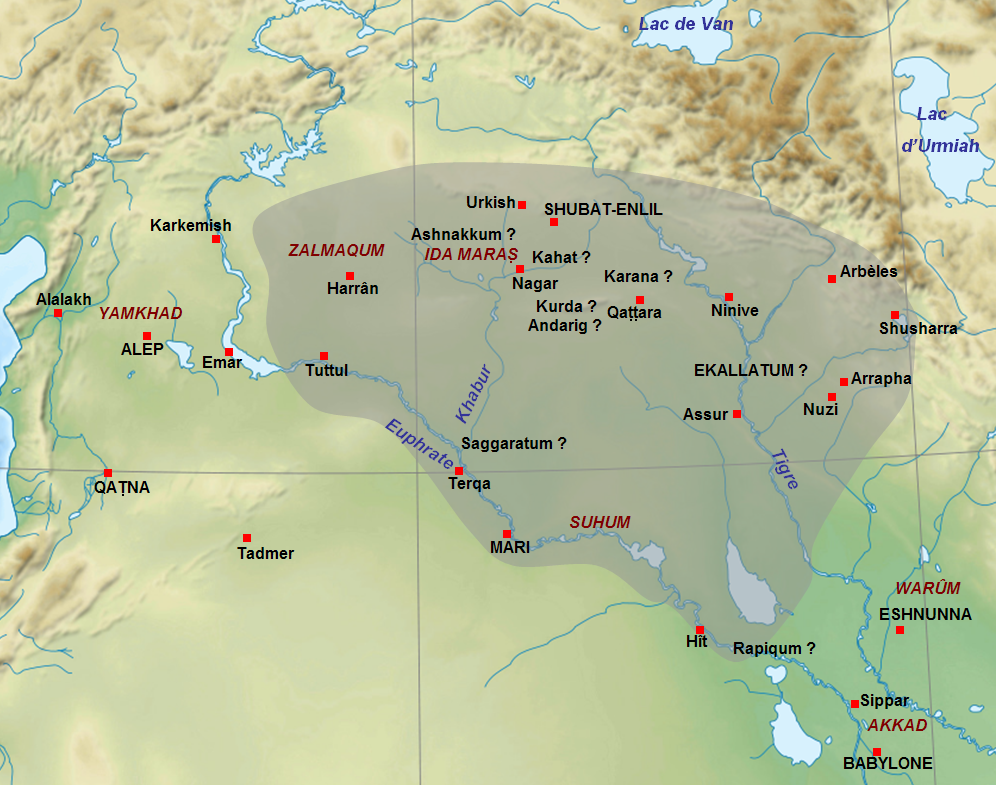
Approximate extent of the Kingdom of Upper Mesopotamia at the time of Samsi-Addu's death.

Around 1810–1805, a ruler named Yahdun-Lim came to power in Mari. Little is known about his origins, but we do know that he was the son of Yaggid-Lim, a king whose capital appears to have been located at Ṣuprum, near Mari but situated on the other side of the Euphrates. In any case, his power also had a tribal aspect, and he established a dual dynasty: he was both king of the land of Mari and king of the “Bedouins” of his tribe, the Bensimalites (or Sim’alites). He asserted his authority over a large portion of the area between the middle reaches of the Tigris and the Euphrates—the “Jazira”—becoming the suzerain of the region’s kings. His great rival was Samsi-Addu (or Shamshi-Adad), a king whose city of origin appears to have been the venerable Akkad, from which he was ousted before establishing a new capital further north at Ekallatum. The king of Mari was killed in 1794 in a palace intrigue, which brought his son Sumu-Yamam to power. But he was defeated two years later by Samsi-Addu, who, around the same time, succeeded in ousting the other major kings of the Jazira and establishing a vast kingdom, which modern historians refer to as the Kingdom of Upper Mesopotamia. To rule Mari, he enthroned his son Yasmah-Addu there, while his other son, Ishme-Dagan, settled in Ekallatum. He himself established a capital in the center of his kingdom, at Shubat-Enlil (or Shekhna). He managed to maintain this political structure for about fifteen years, despite the threats posed by the kingdom of Yamhad to the west and that of Eshnunna to the east.

=== Origins ===
Zimri-Lim was born into the clan of Yahdun-Lim, who heads the tribal confederation of the Bensimalites. He is likely the nephew or grandson of the deposed king of Mari. He spent his early years in exile, as his family was forced to flee the territories controlled by Samsi-Addu, accompanied by a large number of clan members. He was likely a teenager at the time of these events, since by the time of his accession—after fifteen years in exile—he already had daughters of marriageable age. The exact location where Zimri-Lim spent his exile is unknown, but it is certain that it was in a territory within the kingdom of Yamhad, or at least under its protection. Nor is it known under what circumstances he became the clan leader and thus the heir to the claim to the throne of Mari as the successor to Yahdun-Lim.

=== Rise to power ===
Syria and Upper Mesopotamia during the Mari Archives period. Cities whose locations are uncertain are in italics.

The years 1777–76 BC were marked by a resurgence of unrest in the kingdom of Samsi-Addu. The king’s death in 1775 triggered an outbreak of revolts that brought down his kingdom. The descendants of the former ousted rulers attempted to reclaim their inheritance, and Zimri-Lim set out for Mari, along with the other Bensimalites who had fled earlier. Letters received by Yasmah-Addu at this time allow us to track the rapid advance of the troops toward Mari, as they moved along the Euphrates, capturing Tuttul and then Terqa. Mari was seized by another force, led by the Bensimalite warlord named Bannum. Yasmah-Addu died at this time or shortly thereafter, as he disappears from the historical record. His brother Ishme-Dagan, however, maintained a kingdom to the east in Ekallatum, though he was unable to intervene in Mari. Zimri-Lim entered Mari and was crowned in Terqa, in the temple of the god Dagan.

Zimri-Lim quickly faced a diplomatic dilemma as he sought to consolidate his power: whether to choose the alliance and protection of Yarim-Lim I of Aleppo to the west, or that of Ibal-pi-El II of Eshnunna to the east. He remained loyal to the former, to whom he likely owed his survival and his rise to power, and married his daughter Shibtu. Shortly before that, he also appears to have married a daughter of the king of Qatna, who had previously been married to Yasmah-Addu, which allowed him to maintain good relations with another western power. He also took on some of Yasmah-Addu’s former servants, a move that earned him criticism from some of his close associates, who doubted their loyalty.

Just as Zimri-Lim was seizing power in Mari, other kings were reclaiming their ancestors’ territories in Upper Mesopotamia, leading to a rapid balkanization of the region. As the ruler of the traditional dominant power, Zimri-Lim quickly asserted his ambition to become the suzerain of this region, as indicated by this letter he sent to two petty kings settled to the north of his kingdom, in the Khabur Triangle, the land of Ida-maraṣ:

The entire region has returned to its allotted inheritances (isqum) and every (ruler) returned to his dynastic throne. I heard it said, ‘The land of Idamaraṣ, wherever fortresses are held, heeds Zimri-Lim only.’ Now then, write to me and I will come to take a sacred oath for you. Hand over a city to me and I shall give it (back) to its owner. As for all of you, I shall set you up and your belongings as well wherever you say. On hearing my tablet, send promptly to me an answer to my letter.

Zimri-Lim supported the ascension to power of several kings in the region, thereby securing their allegiance. He intervened militarily on several occasions, first to drive out the remnants of Samsi-Addu’s troops still in the region, and then to demonstrate his strength to the local kings who challenged his authority.

=== The war against Eshnunna and the Benjaminites ===
When he seized power, Zimri-Lim was able to count on the support of troops from the tribe of the Benjaminites, even though they were the usual rivals of the Bensimalites. But the Benjaminite kings were reluctant to acknowledge his authority any longer. They received a promise of support from Eshnunna, which was in rivalry with Mari over control of the territories downstream from Mari, the land of Suhum. The Benjaminite kings rose up for the first time in 1773, without success, largely because they did not receive any aid from Eshnunna.

While Zimri-Lim was consolidating his hold over his vassals, the simmering conflict between Mari and Eshnunna erupted in the fall of 1772 when Eshnunna’s troops invaded the Suhum. The Benjaminites rose up once again, and Eshnunna sent another contingent of troops that marched up the Tigris Valley and then headed toward the Khabur Triangle. This forced Mari to wage war on multiple fronts and to launch a diplomatic offensive to secure the support of other major powers (Babylon and Qatna) and the loyalty of the northern petty kings, who were divided between those remaining loyal to Zimri-Lim and those joining Eshnunna’s side. Just as Mari and its allies seemed to be struggling to hold their ground against the invaders, the latter came under attack at the other end of their kingdom, in the Zagros Mountains, forcing them to make a partial retreat. The Eshnunna troops remaining in the north were defeated at Andarig and retreated, ushering in a period of reckoning against the local kings who had sided with them. The Eshnunna armies that had invaded Suhum also withdrew. The Benjaminites had suffered several defeats and subsequently chose reconciliation and submission to Zimri-Lim.

Peace with Eshnunna was harder to negotiate, but it was concluded in 1770: Zimri-Lim recognized the king of Eshnunna, Ibal-pi-El, as his “father”—and thus his superior—but he regained all the territories that Eshnunna had invaded.

=== Consolidating power ===
Following his victory, Zimri-Lim consolidated his authority over his vassals and his status as “great king,” equal to the other major powers dominating the Middle East. Samsi-Addu’s son, Ishme-Dagan, lost the throne of Ekallatum and fled to Babylon, thereby removing the threat he posed. This did not mean that peace had been established, since the various minor kings of Upper Mesopotamia who recognized the suzerainty of the king of Mari were quick to quarrel among themselves, leading to various conflicts and prompting Zimri-Lim to intervene to install kings who enjoyed his favor. He traveled in person to the Khabur region in 1767, but this was not enough to ease political tensions.

In 1766–1765, Mari forged closer ties with Elam, a kingdom located in what is now southwestern Iran, which was then considered the greatest power in the Middle East. This was of commercial interest because the kingdom controlled the trade routes carrying tin and lapis lazuli from countries even further to the east, but it was also of political and military interest because the Elamites were planning to attack Eshnunna. Eshnunna’s other major rival, Hammurabi of Babylon, also joined the coalition. Elamite troops attacked Eshnunna and captured it in 1765.

In the spring of that same year, Zimri-Lim took part in a military campaign in support of Yamhad against one of its vassals. Rather than returning to Mari immediately afterward, he undertook a journey that took him as far as Ugarit, on the Mediterranean Sea. It was during this journey that he learned that the Elamites, not content with having captured Eshnunna, had decided to continue their advance toward the Mesopotamian plain. He set out for Mari, just as a large-scale conflict was beginning.

=== The war against Elam and the rise of Babylon ===
The war with the Elamites is documented in numerous letters, which indicate the state of alert in which the kingdoms of Mesopotamia and Syria found themselves. The Elamite troops followed the same route as those from Eshnunna had taken shortly before, traveling up the Tigris and then entering the Khabur Triangle, where some of the kings defected to their side, either by force or by choice. Another Elamite force traveled down the Tigris toward Babylon. The two kings most under threat, Zimri-Lim and Hammurabi, therefore set out to form an alliance and lead a coalition to repel the invaders, though not without facing refusals (notably from Qatna and Larsa). After a bitter struggle, the coalition forces defeated the Elamites at Hiritum, in northern Babylonia, and forced them to retreat.

The end of the war triggered a new wave of overthrows and local conflicts in the northern kingdoms, as well as the return of Zimri-Lim’s sworn enemy, Ishme-Dagan, who reclaimed his throne in Ekallatum. At first, Ishme-Dagan seemed more favorably disposed toward the king of Mari, who held a position of strength in Upper Mesopotamia following his various triumphs. Nevertheless, he suffered further setbacks and returned into exile in Babylon. The king of Babylon, Hammurabi, then took advantage of Mari’s military support to seize Larsa, his great southern rival. He also succeeded in extending his influence over what remained of the kingdom of Eshnunna. Although he did not have his full forces at his disposal, Zimri-Lim intervened militarily twice in the north and succeeded in subduing the petty kings who were seeking independence. But Hammurabi was gaining ground in the Tigris Valley and was beginning to exert influence in Southern Sinjar, where the situation remained unstable: there he settled a succession dispute that had arisen in Andarig and stationed part of his army there, even though the region was, in principle, under Mari’s sphere of influence.

=== The fall of Mari ===
The most recent letters found in the Royal Palace of Mari suggest a rise in tensions between Mari and Babylon, due to the fact that Babylon was seeking to extend its influence further north, thus into Mari’s territory. In 1762, when Babylon captured Eshnunna, it appears that Zimri-Lim sided with the latter at the expense of the former, despite Hammurabi being his ally. This could explain why he, in turn, became a target of the Babylonian king.

In any case, Mari was captured by Babylon, apparently in the spring of 1761, under circumstances that remain unknown due to a lack of sources: Hammurabi alludes to this event in only two inscriptions, which has given rise to various theories regarding the sequence of events. It is not known what became of Zimri-Lim, about whom no further information exists after this date. Babylonian troops also inflicted defeats on kings of Upper Mesopotamia, who may have been allies who had come to Mari’s aid. The city of Mari was occupied for several months by the victors, who stripped the palace of whatever was of interest to them (including the records that would have documented the fall of Mari), then set it ablaze in 1759, leading to its abandonment.

== Family ==
=== Parents ===
Zimri-Lim’s mother was Addu-duri, who died in the sixth year of his reign. She may have been of Benjaminite origin. His correspondence indicates that the queen mother played an important role, particularly in religious and administrative matters, and managed the palace when the king was away, during years when her son’s power had not yet been consolidated.

His father, who died before he ascended the throne and about whom little is known, was a man named Hadni-Addu. He was a member of Yahdun-Lim’s family, likely his brother or his son. Yahdun-Lim is therefore Zimri-Lim’s uncle or grandfather, even though Zimri-Lim officially presented himself as his son in order to consolidate his position as successor and heir to the throne of Mari and as tribal chieftain.

=== Wives ===
Zimri-Lim had several wives (kallatum). They were apparently all of royal blood, but were ranked in a hierarchical order that gave priority to those with the most distinguished ancestry.

The first is Dam-hurasi(m). According to the identification proposed by J.-M. Durand, she was a princess of Qatna who had previously been a wife of Yasmah-Addu and was mentioned during that reign under the name Beltum. Zimri-Lim would then have married her when he overthrew Yasmah-Addu, following the custom of the time allowing a victorious king would take the harem of the man he defeated. From a diplomatic standpoint, this was an opportunity to strengthen his ties with the (powerful) kingdom she came from.

Zimri-Lim’s other main wife was Shibtu(m), a princess from the other great Syrian kingdom, Yamhad (Aleppo). He married her in his second year of reign. In practice, if not in principle, she was Zimri-Lim’s true first wife, the one who is by far the most frequently mentioned in royal correspondence, and she held the most prominent position in the palace administration.

Zimri-Lim’s third wife, who also held an important position, was a woman named Yataraya. Her exact origins are unknown; in any case, she was not a princess from a great kingdom, and she was already married to Zimri-Lim when he came to power, presumably as his principal wife, but she had to yield her place to the two other main wives. Nevertheless, she maintained a special personal bond with Zimri-Lim: she bore him several children before his accession and continued to bear him children afterward, and she is the one accompanying him on his travels.. She also oversaw the supply of food and wine

Several letters from the correspondence of Zimri-Lim’s wives, written while the king was away, shed light on a few intimate moments. One letter indicates that Shibtum sent the king some garments she had made:

May my lord defeat his foes and reenter Mari in peace and happiness. Now then, my lord should set on his shoulders the garment and shirt that I myself have made.

A letter from Yataraya was written while she was accompanying Zimri-Lim on a journey to the north. It was addressed to Shibtum, whose prominent position is clearly evident, to give her news:

Tell my Queen: Thus speaks Yataraya, your servant.
My Lord is in good health; the armies and the servants are in good health. May the Lady of the Palace (a goddess) grant my Queen a long life, for my sake! May news of my Queen’s health reach me constantly! I am very attentive to news of my Queen’s health!
I will send my Queen any news I learn after sending this tablet.
On the day I am sending you this tablet, the King has paid tribute to my Lord; he has granted freedom to the palace of Ilan-ṣura.

Twenty other wife of Zimri-Lim are attested in the sources, though they were less important than the previous ones and thus less well documented. Zimri-Lim likely had more concubines, who are labelled as “musicians” (nārtum), which also included women of high birth, such as princesses. One of Zimri-Lim’s wives, named Beltani, thus appears to have been a former “musician.”

=== Children ===
About twenty princesses, daughters of Zimri-Lim, are mentioned in the texts. At the time of his accession to the throne, Zimri-Lim had several daughters of marriageable age, whom he married off to vassal rulers. Others were born during his reign. His youngest daughters and sons lived in the palace.

Only three of Zimri-Lim’s sons are known, all born during his reign. They were all named after an ancestor of Zimri-Lim to ensure dynastic continuity. The heir apparent was Yaggid-Lim, who appears to have been the son of Dam-hurasi. Hadni-Addu appears to have been the son of Shibtum. A third son, Yahdun-Lim, died in infancy, as his tomb is mentioned in a tablet.

Little is known about young children: their births are documented in administrative records listing the gifts given to their mothers after childbirth, and a few letters also announce births, such as this one sent by Shibtum regarding the birth of twins:

I gave birth to twins, a boy and a girl. My lord should be pleased.

In contrast, another letter mentions the death of a young princess and the precautions taken to inform the king:

Before the King reaches Mari, do tell him that the young girl died. He ought to know. It must not happen that the King (first) hears about the death of this young girl as he enters Mari, lest be seized then by profound grief.

== Government ==
=== Administration and control of the kingdom ===
At the head of the kingdom stands the king (šarrum), whose legitimacy is both divine (he is the chosen one of the great gods of kingship) and dynastic (he is the heir of a lineage that has ruled his tribe and the kingdom in the past). He has a central administration composed of his inner circle. Among the most important dignitaries are the šukkallum, a “prime minister” or “vizier,” and the šandabakkum, whose role is to oversee the economy of the royal domain. A council (pirištum, “secret”) assists the sovereign in his decision-making. Queen Shibtu also plays an important role in the administration of the palace and religious affairs, particularly when the king is away from the capital. The heart of the kingdom, centered around the cities of Mari, Terqa, and Saggaratum, is organized according to a provincial system. In addition to his role as “King of Mari,” Zimri-Lim is also a tribal leader, the “King of the Tribal Land” (ḫanû; also translated as "Bedouin Land") meaning he is the leader of the Amorite tribes of the Bensimalites, some of whom may venture beyond the borders of his kingdom because they practice pastoral nomadism.

It is quite difficult to summarize (and map) the kingdom of Zimri-Lim in the manner of a modern state. In particular, as indicated by his dual title as king of Mari and of the "Bedouins," the territory over which Zimri-Lim exercised authority included both sedentary and nomadic populations, the latter of whom often crossed border lines. Terminology from the period, based on the population, distinguishes between Zimri-Lim’s kingdom proper, an area of sedentary settlement along the riverbanks (namlakātum; also the “land” mātum), and the steppe areas used by the nomadic subjects of Zimri-Lim (nawūm)..

But beyond this dichotomy, he also holds several other types of authority that vary in both nature and intensity, and are subject to many limitations. According to the overview provided by J.-M. Durand: "In the Mari region, we see the bensim'alite Zimrî-Lîm (a) establishing himself in a city from the 3rd millennium BC, which was no longer what it once was, making do with a palace whose layout he had not designed; (b) tolerating—at first—at least semi-autonomous powers a few kilometers from his capital, to whom he would later grant certain tenure rights; (c) directly govern territories clearly outside the kingdom, such as the entire Euphrates Valley downstream from Abu-Kemal to the gates of Babylon, or upstream from Deir ez-Zor to the Halebiye Pass, as well as the Khabur River from upstream of Saggarâtum to the vicinity of Hasseke; (d) to rally around him a disorganized confederation of princes from the Jazira, who were themselves grouped into several (highly volatile) leagues; (e) to install in certain major centers, such as Tuttul, a hazzannum (now ludicrously translated as “mayor,” but which, in fact, represented a sort of minister plenipotentiary whose presence ensured his master’s primacy within the subjugated community); (e) form kinship alliances with larger states that considered themselves at least his equals, such as the kingdoms of Razamâ or Kurdâ, and perhaps Andarig, whose king granted him the title of “elder brother”; finally, (f) acquire significant territories abroad, perhaps to secure supplies of basic necessities—a move that reveals he already possessed lands far from home in the coastal region of the Kingdom of Aleppo. But the true strength of this king of Mari came (g) from the loyalty sworn to him by major Bedouin tribes, who formed the spearhead of his army and thanks to whom he was able to intervene on all fronts in the Near East."

To exercise his authority, Zimri-Lim relied first and foremost on the flow of information: he expected his various subordinates to keep him informed of what was happening in his many areas of interest. The letters specifically refer to a “complete report” (ṭêmum gamrum) when the reliability of the information has been verified. At other times, less complete information—or even rumors—is reported. Once the king has made a decision, he issues more or less detailed instructions, sometimes in a solemn form, such as decrees or edicts (šipṭum). These decisions are often binding and can go as far as formal warnings accompanied by threats when an initial order has not been obeyed. These decrees can also be commitments he makes to certain subjects. They are sometimes quoted in letters, such as this one:

When my lord was setting out on a campaign, he issued the following decree (šipṭum) to the commoners (muškēnū), “The operation I am undertaking is not of long duration. The one you will undertake is to give support for just ten days per month. Until you come back, no lieutenant or bailiff will make demands on your household.” This is the decree that my lord issued.

Zimri-Lim used oaths to consolidate his political authority over his servants, his vassals, and, more generally, his subjects.

The period of Zimri-Lim’s reign bore the weight of past upheavals: dynastic changes in Mari, rivalries, vendettas, and tribal wars; endemic local conflicts compounded by wars between major powers; mass migrations; as well as famines and epidemics—all of which led to great instability. The authorities appear to have sought to address this through a form of authoritarian crackdown, aimed at restoring order to the kingdom and the regions under its influence, even if it meant employing brutal and expedient methods.

=== War and the military ===
In the Syro-Mesopotamian tradition, the king is a war leader, and this is evident in all types of documents that shed light on the royal ideology of the time: regnal years (for example, the third year, “The Year Zimri-Lim Won the Victory over the Benjaminites”) and commemorative inscriptions recount his military victories; images often portray him as a warrior king striking down his enemies with the support of the gods, and the so-called Epic of Zimri-Lim gives an epic dimension to his triumphs. According to the ideology of the time, the support of the gods was necessary for victory, and Zimri-Lim sought their counsel through divination rituals before making any military decisions (see below).

More generally, the letters show that he kept himself constantly informed about the progress of the conflicts and remained close to his troops in order to maintain their confidence and galvanize them. The highest-ranking officers in his army were also often among the guests at the banquets he organized. On several occasions, he personally took command of his troops, and he appears to have done without a general-in-chief, unlike other rulers of the period..

The vicious cycle in which the kingdoms of the period seemed to be caught is evident in a letter from one of Zimri-Lim’s generals, who warns him about the boundless ambitions of Eshnunna—which had replaced Samsi-Addu as the primary threat to his dynasty—and urges him to attack it before it attacks him:

I have heard about the release of Yariḫa-abum from the (control of the) ruler of Ešnunna. My lord knows how full of deceit that House is. I fear that until it captures Andarig, it will keep my lord completely duped. But as soon as it seizes Andarig, it will aim for Kurda. Subsequently, it will cross Mount Saggar [Sinjar], and all of Šubartum will shout “Hail, my lord” to it. This House is beginning to behave as did Samsi-Addu in progressively resetting his frontiers. Seizing Ekallatum, it will [move] toward Qaṭṭara and Allaḫad. Once it seizes a town, it forces it under its control. This House is indeed full of deceit. Now before the burden becomes too heavy to bear, time is near when we must move against him. The tribesmen are eager for battle; the rulers of Idamaraṣ are gathered, together with their armies, and look only toward my lord for help. The sheikhs (sugāgū) are gathered and have sent Anniti-El and Ḫanzan to my lord. My lord should consult with his servants and decide on heading here.

In a letter from Zimri-Lim to the king of Yamhad, he expresses his frustration at this endless series of conflicts: "Now, ever since I came to the throne many days ago, I could look ahead only to wars and battles. I have never brought in a full harvest (in peace)." His reign began with war, seems to have known peace only during the period from his sixth to his ninth year, and ended in war.

The armies of Zimri-Lim’s time included few professional soldiers. These were found in the rulers’ personal guards. To wage campaigns, it was therefore necessary to raise troops. To do so, the king conducted censuses (tēbibtum), which provided military rolls listing those eligible for mobilization. In total, the army of Mari could count on at least 4,500 men, plus contingents raised from among the nomads—who were not subject to the census—and who also constituted a force of several thousand men. Added to this were contingents from allied states. The troops were organized into corps of 1,000 men led by a general, which were in turn subdivided into sections of 100 men led by commanders assisted by two lieutenants. The soldiers were predominantly infantrymen, armed with spears and bows. Chariots appear to have played a secondary role, but mounted cavalry seems to have been important from this period onward.

War was also suppose to be lucrative, and victory was followed by plunder. Captured cities were often sacked, although some were spared in order to secure the loyalty of their inhabitants. Three major events during Zimri-Lim’s reign led to widespread looting: the fall of the Kingdom of Upper Mesopotamia and his ascension to the throne, the end of the Benjaminite revolt, and the campaign in the north during his twelfth year of reign, which notably resulted in the capture of Ashlakka. In several cases, conflicts appear to have ended in outright massacres, but such acts remain poorly documented. Rather, the shortage of people in the kingdom encourages the capture of prisoners of war and their deportation. The case of female prisoners of war is well documented, particularly the harems of defeated kings, which were taken by the victor. Letters indicate that Zimri-Lim was concerned with their distribution, reserving the right to incorporate the most beautiful among them into his own harem. The king had a share of the spoils reserved for him, but he was also not to forget those who had helped him achieve victory and was to grant them a share of the spoils. This applied first and foremost to the gods, who received spoils of war as offerings (including prisoners of war, who became slaves of the gods' estates).

=== Diplomacy ===
The texts found at Mari are the main source of information on international relations in the 18th century BC, just as the Amarna Letters do for the 14th century BC. They point to the existence of a diplomatic system based on a set of norms that regulated relations between kingdoms..

A hierarchical principle governs international relations: a group of great kings rule over second-tier kings, who are generally vassals of one of the former. This is expressed in terminology as a relationship between “lord/master” and “servant,” but also through the metaphor of the family: in their letters, the former regard themselves as the “fathers” of the latter, who are their “sons.” Kings of equal rank regarded one another as “brothers.” These positions shifted according to changes in the balance of power. Zimri-Lim had to prove himself at the beginning of his reign and win several conflicts to establish himself as a first-rank king..

Ordinary relations between the courts involved the exchange of messengers representing the ruler, who sent them to the court of another king (there were no permanent ambassadors during this period). These messengers might be tasked with carrying the gifts that kings exchanged with one another (notably tableware and luxury fabrics), or to conduct negotiations between the two courts. The representatives of the king of Mari at the court of Babylon thus kept their master informed of their negotiations with the Babylonian king, but they also served as informants on the diplomatic activities they observed at the Babylonian court and reported back to their lord. Numerous texts from the palace of Mari briefly record the arrivals of foreign messengers with their escorts, whether they were individuals who had come to deliver a message to Zimri-Lim or were merely passing through Mari to deliver a message elsewhere without meeting the king, as diplomatic custom of the time required that they be provided lodging..

Representatives of major monarchies generally had direct access to the king during audiences that were, in principle, public. A diplomatic mission delivers a message, accompanied by gifts. It may not depart until it receives authorization to do so, at which point it is presented with a gift in return for the one it brought and for any personal gifts. As is customary, the exchange of gifts is based on reciprocity: a king must offer gifts of equal value to those he receives, and a deviation from this principle can be viewed as an affront.

Diplomatic alliances have also been studied thanks to documents from Mari. These are “oaths by the gods” in which one king makes a commitment to another, whether it be a vassal swearing loyalty to his suzerain, an ally vowing to come to the aid of his “brother” against a third king, or two former enemies promising never to attack one another again. Rituals accompany these oaths: when kings meet in the same place to take an oath, they sacrifice a donkey foal; if they conclude their alliance while apart from one another, the ceremony is called “touching the throat” (smearing with blood?). Some of the texts recited during the oaths were put in writing; these are not peace treaties in the strict sense, but rather a kind of oath-taking protocol.. Four of these tablets containing oaths made by kings to Zimri-Lim have been discovered: that of Ibal-pi-El II of Eshnunna at the end of his conflict with Mari; that of Hammurabi of Babylon during the conflict against Elam; that of Atamrum of Andarig upon his accession to the throne; and that of a king of Sinjar (of Kurda?), found in a highly fragmentary state.

For example, the one concerning Atamrum, who is a vassal of Zimri-Lim, pertains to the former’s loyalty to the latter:

By Šamaš of [Heaven], Atamrum, son of Warad-Sin, king of Andarig, swore: “I swear that from this day forward, as long as I live, against Zimri-Lim, son of Yahdun-Lim, king of Mari and the land of the Bedouins—against his [city], his army, and his country—I will commit no wrongdoing, [and that toward] Zimri-Lim, son of Yahdun-Lim, [king of Mari and the land of the] Bedouins, [I will not sin in any way(?)]. (…) (I swear that …) what I wrote to Zimri-Lim, son of Yahdun-Lim, king of Mari and the land of the Bedouins, I did not write to him out of falsehood or malice, and that I wrote it to him with no ulterior motive. The good words that I swore to Zimri-Lim, son of Yahdun-Lim, king of Mari and the land of the Haneans, I will scrupulously keep to him with complete sincerity.

Interdynastic marriages were another important aspect of diplomatic practices. They served to strengthen alliances between rulers. All of Zimri-Lim’s wives were clearly of royal blood. The best-documented case is the marriage he contracted early in his reign to Shibtu, the daughter of the powerful Yarim-Lim I of Aleppo, who had helped him ascend to the throne, and which was intended to consolidate the alliance between the two. The arrangement of this marriage is well documented in a collection of letters. The diviner Asqudum and the chief musician Rishiya led the embassy dispatched from Mari to Aleppo for the negotiations and to accompany the procession bringing the bride back to Mari. In particular, negotiations focused on the dowry (nidittum) given to Shibtu when she left her family, and the counter-dowry (terhatum) given in exchange by the groom. On this occasion, jewelry, luxury tableware, clothing, and animals were exchanged. A wedding gift (biblum) is also given by the future husband to his in-laws. The marriage rite is performed by proxy: since the king does not travel to Aleppo, his envoys place the veil on the bride, thereby sealing the union. Discussions also concern the conditions under which the queen is to be housed in Mari.

Since Zimri-Lim had sisters and far more daughters than sons, he pursued a very active marriage policy in order to strengthen his ties with vassal kings. Vassals could also request a daughter of Zimri-Lim, as in the following example, probably sent by the Elders of a city:

We, your servants, are in complete accord; there is no one who disagrees. This house has always been your house; the sissiktum fringe of this house is bound to your sissiktum fringe. Our lord has just had his servants swear an oath by the gods, saying: "Place the heir upon the throne!" We have now placed the heir, your "son," upon the throne. You must lay your hand upon your "son;" we shall hold the hem of your garment. Give a young woman, your daughter, to the young man, your "son," so that this house may remain your house, just as it was before.

The case of Ibni-sharri illustrates the difficult situations in which Zimri-Lim’s daughters could find themselves when sent to potentially hostile courts. She was married to Zakura-abum, king of Zalluhan, a prominent figure of the Bensimalite tribe, and held the status of queen; however, her husband (perhaps an elderly man) died of illness. She was then expelled from her palace by the former, deposed royal family; she managed, with great difficulty, to save her life, but she did not have the opportunity to return to Mari since her father gave her in marriage to Ibal-Addu of Ashlakka. She became queen once again and was treated well for a few years, before relations between Ashlakka and Mari deteriorated, leading to a decline in Ibni-sharri’s standing. She was eventually removed from the palace. She asked her father to allow her to return to Mari, but he managed to persuade her to return to Ashlakka. However, her husband treats her even worse than before and is becoming increasingly hostile toward her father.

=== The king and the gods ===
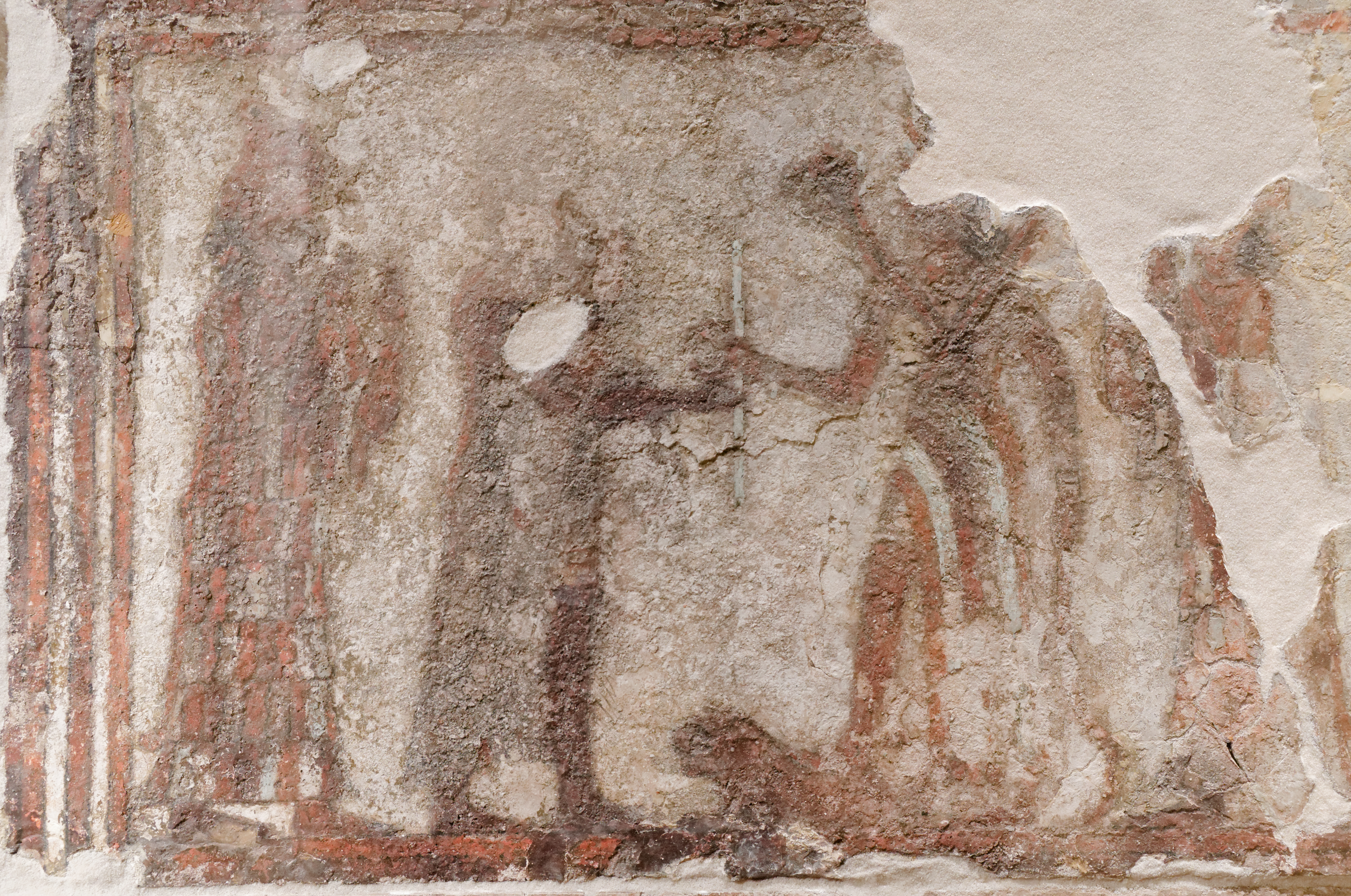
Detail of the Investiture Painting from the Royal Palace of Mari: the goddess Eshtar presents a king with the ring and staff, symbols of kingship. Louvre Museum.

In the kingdom of Mari, three gods in particular are associated with kingship and the notion of divine election. Dagan was the principal regional deity, whose temple was at Terqa. It was there that Zimri-Lim was crowned at the beginning of his reign. Ishtar of Der, or Deritum, is the patron goddess of the dynasty. Zimri-Lim participates in her great annual festival at the beginning of winter, and his vassals are expected to join him there. In the Royal Palace "Investiture Painting" (also called "Investiture of Zimri-Lim," even though it was probably made before his reign), it is Ishtar who presents the king of Mari with the insignia of kingship. Itūr-Mēr, the tutelary god of Mari, is also believed to bestow kingship. Zimri-Lim dedicated a short hymn to him, honoring the god and the protection he granted to the king, as illustrated in the passage: "Itur-Mer the valiant, having only Zimri-Lim in mind, gives him many blessings for his entire life." He is a god more specifically linked to justice, in whose name and before whom oaths are sworn, in the presence of his emblem, during the most important moments, notably the oaths sworn by vassals.

Zimri-Lim also maintained a special relationship with another sovereign deity, this time foreign to his kingdom, the great god Addu of Aleppo. In the following prophecy uttered by a prophet of this god, is found one of the clearest expressions of the ideology of the relationship between the king and the gods in the epistolary documentation of Mari:

Abiya, āpilum of Addu, Lord of Ḫalab, came by to tell me, “Addu says, ‘I had given all the land to Yaḫdun-Lim, and by means of my weapons he had no opponent. When he abandoned me, the land I had given him, I gave to Samsi-Addu. Then when Samsi-Addu [...] I wanted to bring you back. I brought you back on your father’s throne and I handed you the weapon with which I battled against Sea. I rubbed you with oil from my numinous radiance so that no one could stand up to you. Now listen to my only wish: Whenever anyone appeals to you for judgment, saying, “I am aggrieved,” be there to decide his case and to give him satisfaction. This is what I desire of you. When you go out (to war), don’t do so without consulting the omens. When I am the one standing at my omens, then proceed. If otherwise, do not come out of your door.’”

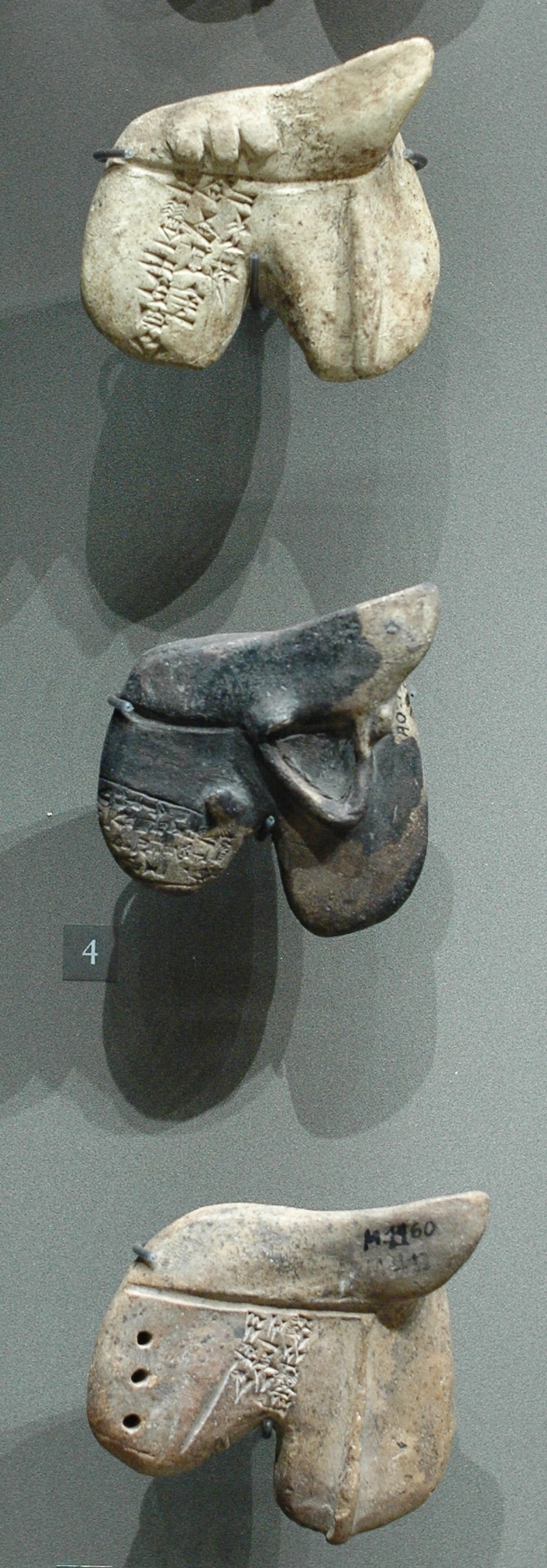
Clay models of divinatory livers, related to hepatoscopy, from the Royal Palace of Mari. Louvre Museum.

As the end of this letter shows, Zimri-Lim had to constantly listen to the gods, above all through divination, which allowed him to receive divine directives, to which he had to comply, whether for the appointment of an official, the opportunity for an alliance, or, quite often, military affairs, and more generally everything that concerned the kingdom and the king. The divinatory procedure most practiced in the royal courts of this period is hepatoscopy or extispicy, divination in the liver of a lamb. These rituals are documented by numerous letters, with the king's servants notably required to make and follow omens, and to inform the king of their results. Diviners thus held a very important place in the king's entourage, as their interpretations could influence crucial political decisions, and they were subject, like other royal servants, to the duty of loyalty and secrecy. The results of oracular consultations must not fall into the wrong hands, and any omen related to the king was a state secret. Like other royal servants, diviners were subject to an oath before the gods in which they pledged to be faithful to Zimri-Lim in all circumstances (particularly when it came to denouncing a colleague).

Those extispicies (omens) were bad. Rebellion was repeatedly indicated. I have put the city gates on notice about the citizens of Rapiqum. The next day Samas-Ina-Matim made extispicies about evicting the citizens of Rapiqum from the city of Terqa and (said), ‘Evict the citizens of Rapiqum who [are staying] inside Terqa, however many they are, from the city!’ I have evicted the citizens of Rapiqum who were staying in Terqa, and I made another set of extispicies [for] the villages about those troops, and my lord must know this.

The king also received divine injunctions that he had not necessarily desired, or at least that he had not solicited. The gods expressed themselves through people, generally linked to their sanctuary, by means of dreams or prophecy, a phenomenon well known from the Bible, for which the Mari documentation provides the oldest possibilities for case studies. The king's servants who were near these sanctuaries, often located abroad, were required to report each of the divine messages spoken for him, as this was part of the duty of informing that they owed to their lord.

Another ritual related to communication with the divine that appears in several documents from the reign of Zimri-Lim is the river ordeal: when a dispute opposes two people or two groups of people, and it cannot be resolved for lack of decisive evidence, it sometimes happens that the parties rely on the opinion of the river god of the city of Hit (in the southeast of the kingdom, shared with Babylon at the time of Zimri-Lim), and submit to a test which involves plunging into the river (its exact modalities are not understood), and which must be succeeded in order to prove that one is in the right (failure can lead to the death of the participant). This obviously only concerns serious cases, and the king is closely following these cases.

=== Public image and glorification ===
Several cylinder seals of Zimri-Lim, known from impressions, bear the inscription "Zimri-Lim appointee ot the god Dagan, beloved of the god Enlil, (who controls the Banks of the Euphrates,) king of Mari and the Bedouin Land, son of Yahdun-Lim." This relates to several elements: the election by the gods associated with kingship (Dagan, Enlil), the dual monarchy exercised both over the territory of Mari and the nomadic groups, and the connection to a dynasty whose predecessor, Yahdun-Lim, had already held the same position and is fictionally presented as the father of Zimri-Lim (although he is more likely his uncle).

The representation of the king through images was also well-thought. A very fragmentary letter describes a stele depicting the king in the company of the god Amurrum, this time in his role as a pious king:

the metalworkers, upon their arrival, began work on the memorial stele. The front and back are completely incised. On a high platform, to the left, a representation of Amurrum raises his curved weapon. Facing him is a representation of my Lord praying. Above the representation is a solar disk and a crescent moon. Behind the stele and on its sides...

The sovereign's public appearances were meticulously planned to perfect the staging of royalty. This letter, dated to the very beginning of Zimri-Lim's reign, indicates that he was advised on his first entry into Mari: by mounting a horse, he would appear as a foreign king, since it was not the local custom, which dictated that the king travel in a palanquin (nūbalum) or on a mule.

The text that historians have named the "Epic of Zimri-Lim" is a remarkable example of the narrative construction of the qualities attributed to the royal figure. It is a text of approximately 170 lines, of which 113 are preserved, written in poetic Akkadian. It recounts Zimri-Lim's conquest of Ida-maraṣ at the beginning of his reign, after several battles. It is an exaltation of the royal figure, the tribal war leader. He acts at the behest of the gods (Dagan, Addu, and Annunikim), and his final triumph is marked by a sacrifice in the temple of Dagan at Terqa.

I praise Zimri-Lim, wild bull in battle
A hero for eternity, I spread widely his fame.
Zimri-Lim, heir of Yaḫdullim, foremost among nomads [...]
In his mother’s worthy womb, gods form his name
May he be hallowed, Image of Anu, Will Bull of his land
Zimri-Lim, gods form his name
May he be hallowed, Image of Anu, Wild Bull of his land.
I exalt the supreme king
Enlil’s enemies he makes his own
Midst the Ḫabur and the Euphrates
Where Addu gives his judgment
He thunders, scattering his (enemy’s) kin
Spreads his fame to the Four Corners.

== Palaces and court life ==
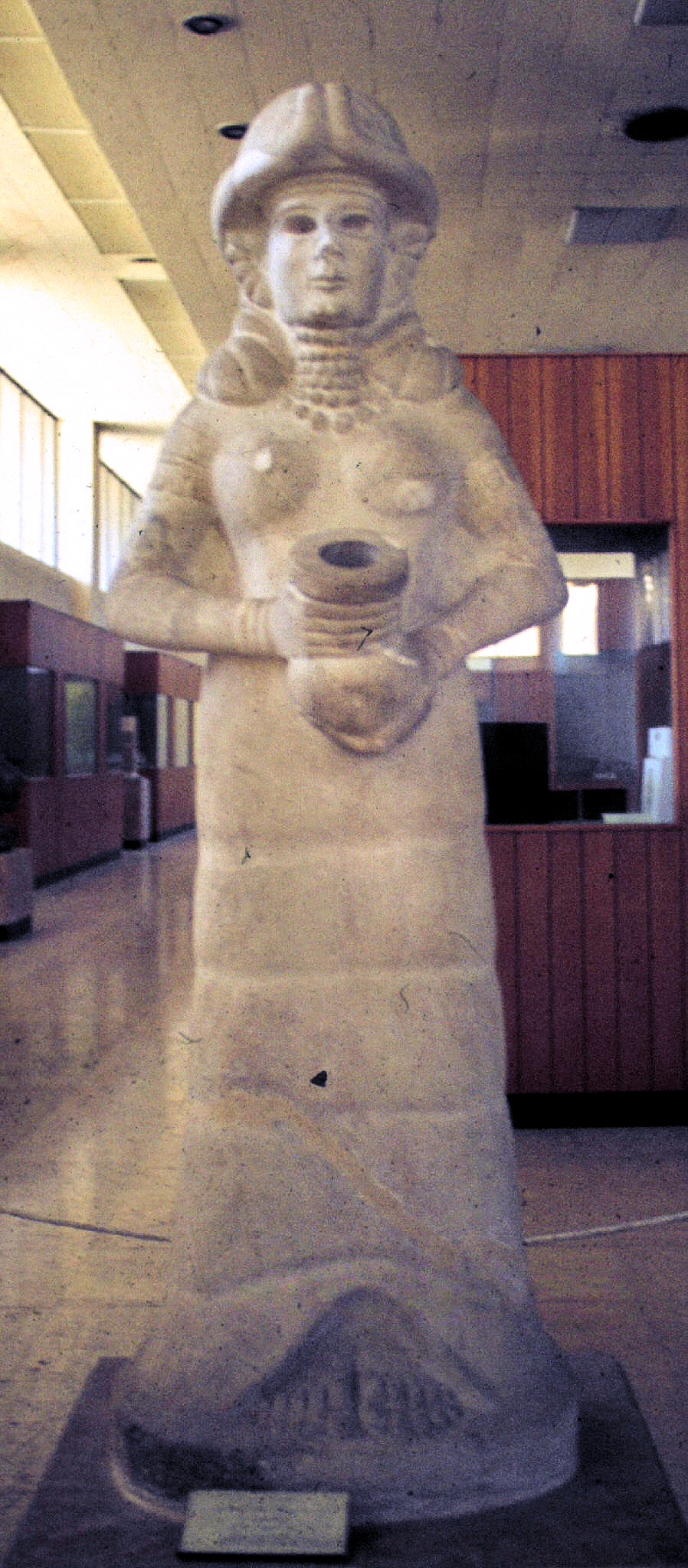
Goddess holding a vase, from the Palace of Mari. Ca. 1900 BC, Aleppo National Museum.

=== The palace of Zimri-Lim ===
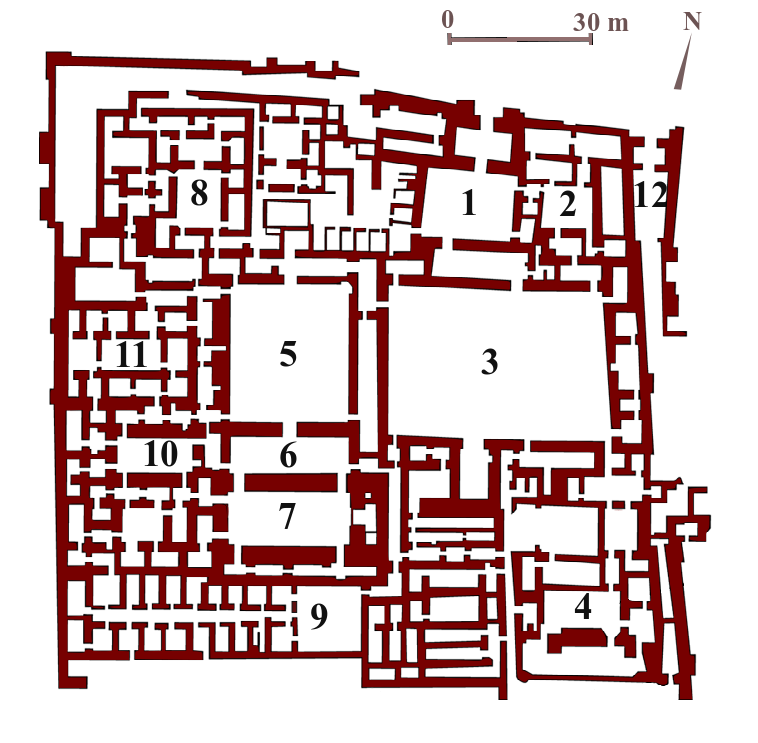
Plan of the royal palace during the reign of Zimri-Lim. 1. entrance courtyard 2. steward’s quarters (bīt tertim) 3. courtyard of the painted building 4. temple of the "Lady of the Palace" 5. palm tree courtyard 6. vestibule (papahum) 7. Throne Room 8. "Harem," Women’s Quarters 9. Servants’ Quarters 10. Kitchens 11. Administrative Section of the Harem 12. Gate of Nergal.

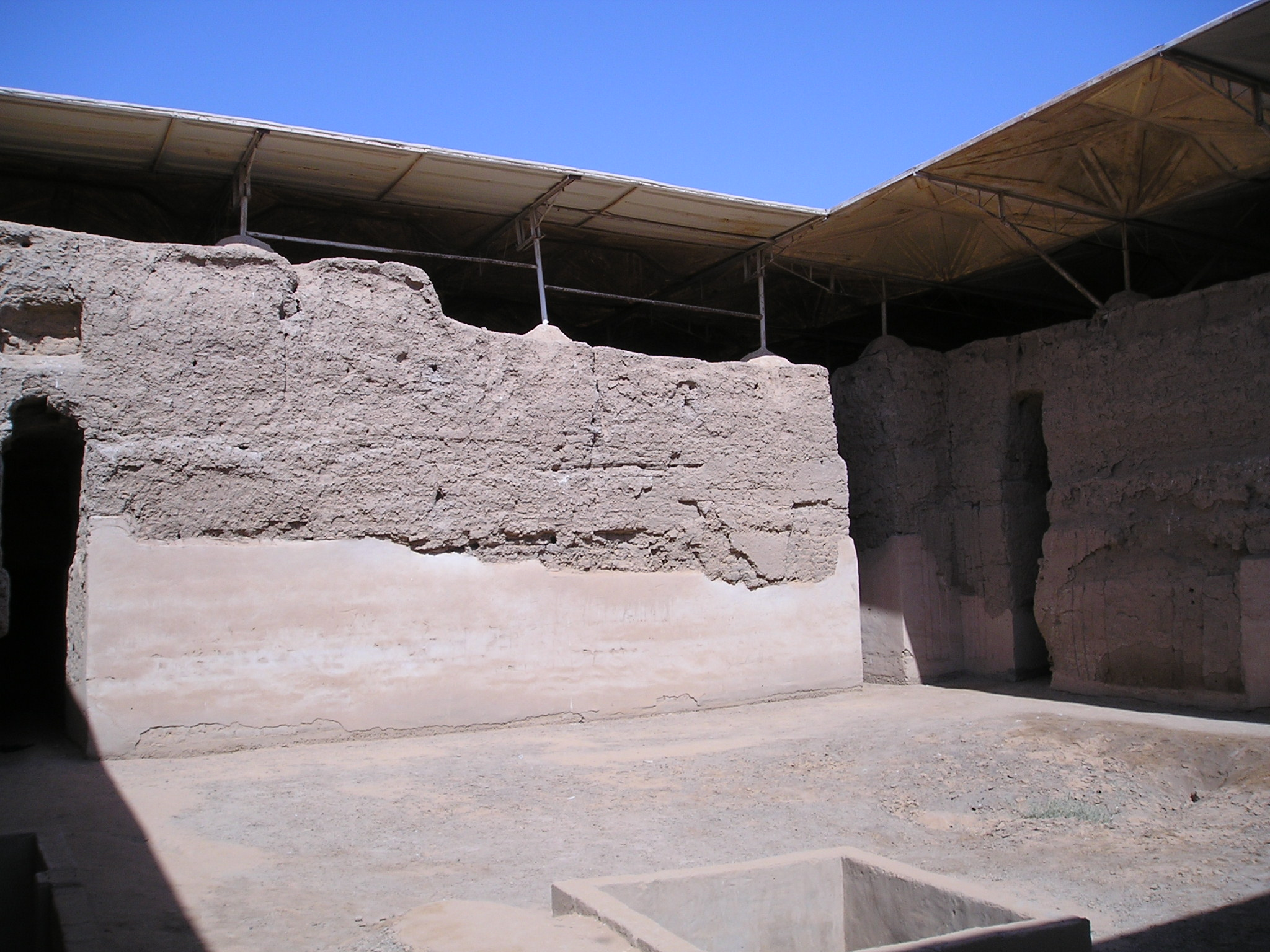
Inner courtyard of the Royal Palace of Mari.

The Royal Palace of Mari is a vast structure covering around 25,000 m² (or 30,000 square yards). With the exception of its southwestern end, which has been lost to erosion, most of the structure has been excavated. The main entrance is located in a northeastern complex, and, a little further east, there is a second gate that appears to have been used to bring in chariots and goods destined for the storerooms. This northeastern complex is dedicated to stewardship and logistics. Two large courtyards organize the complex: the larger one, the "Courtyard of the Painted Building" (or Courtyard 131) to the east, and the "Palm Courtyard" (or Courtyard 106) to the west. The former is so named because it opens onto a small painted chapel dedicated to the goddess Ishtar. The second is so named because a palm tree once stood in its center. It forms the core of the king’s residential quarters: on its south side is an entrance hall (papahum) leading to the throne room. The royal apartments were located on the upper floor, accessible by staircases whose bases have been preserved, and must have overlooked both courtyards on their southern sides. This explains the presence of kitchens, storerooms, and servants’ quarters in the southern part of the building. The section west of the palm courtyard appears to be devoted to reception areas, and the section to the north is the women’s quarters, or "harem." In the southeastern part of the building is a sanctuary dedicated to a goddess, the “Lady of the Palace” (Bēlet ekallim).

The question of who actually resided in the royal palace is debated: it is not in question for the king and his wives and children, as at least some of the domestic staff and guards had to be present at all times for their service and safety, but who else? The available space was vast, but not necessarily sufficient to house all the personnel mentioned in the tablets, and it is perhaps due to overcrowding in the palace that other areas of the capital were remodeled during the reign of Zimri-Lim (see below). The majority of the female population seems to have resided in the palace, whereas this is not necessarily the case for the majority of the male population. In any case, several areas serving as residences for the palace servants have been identified on site, the most numerous in the southwest in the part that seems linked to the king's domestic staff, and the others in the women's area in the northwest. These are small rooms close to each other, the smallest of which, in the Women's House, measure 10-11 m², and in the King's House around 12-15 m² and 18-20 m², the two largest measuring 25 and 36 m²..

The tablets also provide various details about the palace's layout. A letter from Zimri-Lim, who was traveling at the time, to his mother Adda-duri indicates that this great horse enthusiast wished for part of the painted courtyard to be converted into a stable (or even a kind of "zoo," since other animals were kept there), which he could view from the royal apartments:

I keep hearing of the white horses that come from Qaṭna; they are of good quality. So, on the day you receive this tablet from me, in the courtyard of the painted building, at the gate of the guards, so that there may be shade to protect against the heat of the day, let a stable be built there; let it be strewn with reeds; that these horses be kept there; that grain be brought to them.
Furthermore, do not neglect these instructions from me. The stable for these horses must be built in front of my apartments…

In addition to the grand royal palace, the king has several residences at his disposal for his travels, and/or which he entrusts to his wives and concubines or even to high-ranking officials. In Mari, the "Small Eastern Palace," built during the earlier phase of the Šakkanakkus rulers, was renovated under Yasmah-Addu, who may have resided there while the royal palace was under construction. Under Zimri-Lim, it was occupied by Asqudum, one of the king’s chief servants and son-in-law, and later by Queen Shibtu. Another old palatial building of Mari, Building E, was also in use and underwent renovations, but little is known about its final layout. Outside the capital, royal palaces have been identified through textual sources in provincial capitals (Terqa, Saggaratum, Qattunan) and on royal estates.

=== A Central institution ===
The Great Royal Palace is the heart of the Kingdom of Mari: the king resides there most of the time, as does his family. It is from there that he conducts the affairs of the kingdom, and the offices of several high-ranking officials are located there. In ancient conceptions, the “Palace” is, moreover, more than just a building. It is the king’s “House”, that is, an economic and social entity comprising the royal family and its household, the royal estate with its staff, and its movable and immovable property (farmland, herds, workshops, reed beds, etc.), more precisely a “Great House,” which is the literal meaning of its name in Sumerian logograms (É.GAL, transcribed in Akkadian language as ekallum). And since his resources were mobilized for the exercise of power (and particularly for war), which took on a highly personalized character, and since those close to the king formed the foundation of the kingdom’s administration, it can be argued that the ancient concept of “palace” is the one that most closely fits the modern concept of “state.”

Letters and administrative documents from the royal palace provide a wealth of information on the palace’s administration: the procedures for managing the palace and its resources, its supervisory and subordinate staff (ration distribution lists), the various palace supplies, and thus daily life (records of wine, oil, perfumes, tableware, vases, clothing, etc.). The letters also record various aspects of court life: receptions and banquets, etiquette, gratuities, and even slander.

=== Harem ===
Most of the people living in the palace on a permanent basis were women. Part of the royal palace functions as a “harem,” with access controlled by guards. Women enter the palace in various ways: royal wives through diplomatic marriages (they often appear to be of foreign origin); concubines or musicians may be presented as gifts by another king or high-ranking official; and military victories result in the capture of enemy women, particularly those from the harems of defeated kings, who are often taken by the king for the palace. This female population was placed under the authority of a lady-in-waiting: at the beginning of Zimri-Lim’s reign, this was his mother Addu-duri, and after her death, it was his wife Shibtu. The hierarchy among the women of the palace was largely determined by their relationship to the king and could change over time: his wives held the highest ranks, followed by his concubines. The palace musicians, divided into several groups, must also have included, at least in part, royal concubines. The king’s unmarried sisters and daughters also held an important place. Young children, including the king’s sons, also lived in the harem. The servants in this sector were also women (there is no reliable evidence of eunuchs): maids attached to the wives and concubines, chambermaids, wet nurses, cooks, millers, as well as stewards and female scribes who managed the administration of this sector.

The women’s correspondence, exchanged by several women at court, primarily the royal consorts, provides a great wealth of information about life at the palace, often in its most intimate details. Queen Shibtu played a more prominent role, as she oversaw the administration of the harem and religious affairs, and carried out various tasks for her husband when he was away.

A letter from her royal husband even orders her to select female “musicians” for his harem from among prisoners of war:

I have just directed to you female weavers, among whom there are ugbabtum-priestesses. Pick out the ugbabtum-priestesses and assign them to a weaving establishment. Among these female weavers and among those previous as well, select thirty—or as many as there are worth selecting—attractive female weavers who show no blemish from toenail to head hair and assign them to Warad-ilišu (head musician). Warad-ilišu ought to teach them Subarean choir-music. Their dwelling, however, ought to be moved. Be careful with their food-rations so that their looks will not change. When you make your selection, Warad-ilišu should attend. Moreover, alert Mukannišum so that the looks of the other female weavers that you assign to him should not deteriorate.

=== Meals and banquets ===
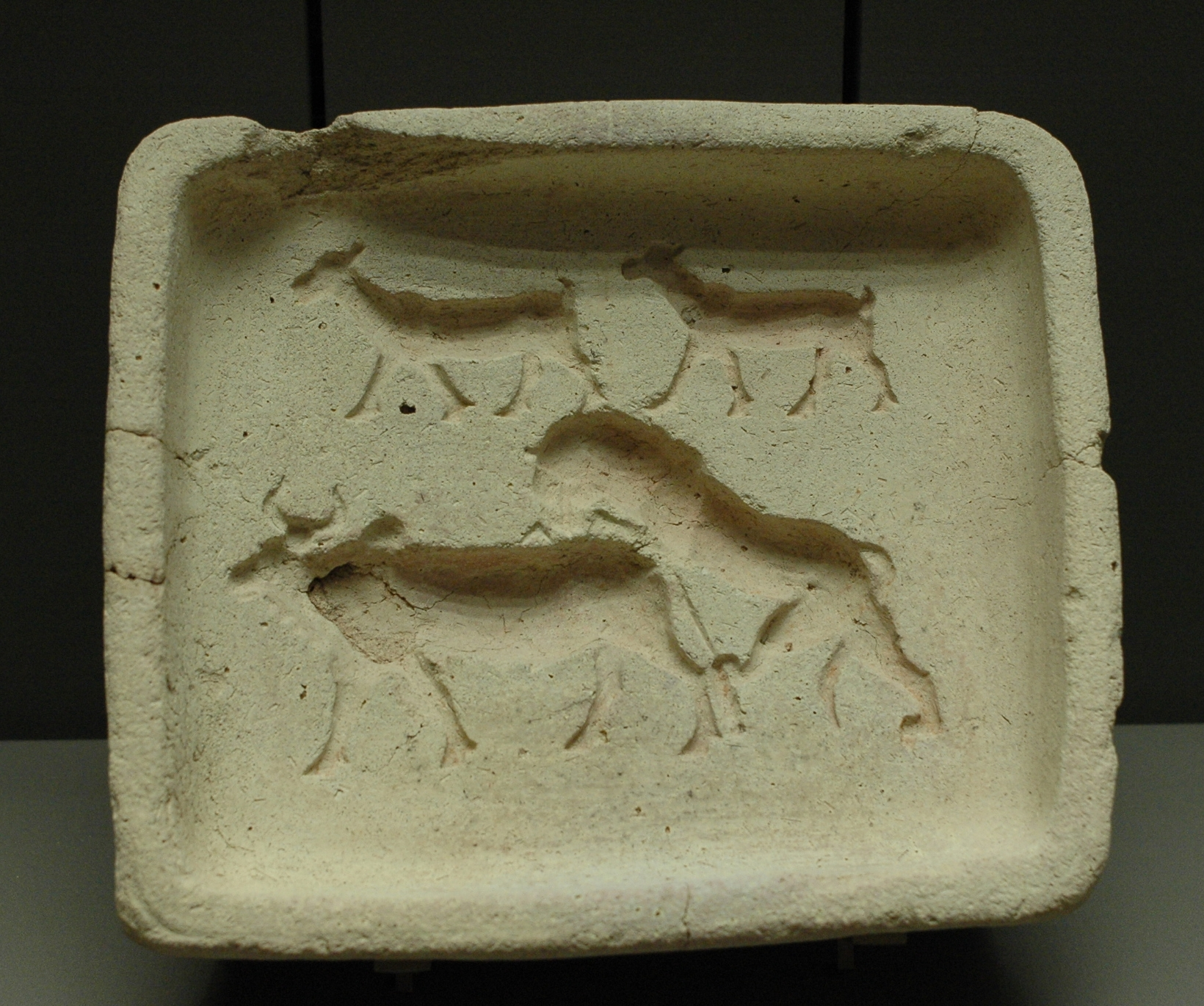
Baking molds decorated with animals from the kitchens of the Palace of Mari. Louvre Museum.

The meals and banquets are known from numerous texts. The accounting tablets for the “king’s meals” include a list of plant-based foods taken from the palace storerooms for the king’s meals (these are not complete “menus”), along with their quantities, the total, and the date. The king ate at least twice a day, in the morning and in the evening. He was always accompanied by high-ranking officials, his guard, and representatives from foreign courts. It is not known, however, whether the king’s wives accompanied him during his meals. The royal banquet was an important occasion in court life, governed by rules of etiquette and protocol: the seating arrangement of the guests was highly symbolic, as proximity to the king was a mark of honor (and an opportunity to speak with him directly), as was sharing his dishes; furthermore, the practices of politeness and paying homage to a high-ranking figure were carefully studied.

Several food storage and cooking facilities have been identified in the palace. The food warehouses appear to be organized according to a hierarchical principle: in the western sector, elongated rooms have been uncovered where jars are stored upright in benches made for this purpose, with remains of jar seals and doors indicating access control, perhaps reserves intended for large occasions (banquets), other smaller stores have been identified elsewhere, in the women's house, and finally some are specialized in the storage of oil and wine. Two kitchen areas have been identified: one unit in the western part, close to the throne room, has in its centre a large vaulted oven and service rooms around it, probably an area intended for baking cakes and breads, as indicated by the presence of cake molds decorated with motifs of animals and naked women; another kitchen has been identified in the northeast unit devoted to the stewardship, with a bench comprising four small hearths and a larger one.

The king asserted his status not only through the quality of the food served at his table, but also through the luxury of his tableware (which was also one of the most exchanged gifts between royal courts). Since precious metal objects were melted down in antiquity, we must turn to inventory records (approximately 300 tablets) to learn about them. They were stored in storerooms with specially designed benches, where they were kept under seal and divided into several collections, each with a different custodian. The inventory lists order the objects according to their material, weight, volume, and function. The vases were made of gold and silver, also bronze, sometimes faience and semi-precious stones, or iron. Common forms include cauldrons, large jars, basins, ewers, and drinking vessels, the latter representing a large proportion of the gold and silver vessels. They were richly ornamented, decorated with engravings or light reliefs, or even protomes, sometimes borrowing their forms from fruits or animals. The texts, however, do not specify the uses of these vessels, and it is possible that some were only displayed during banquets.. The management of luxury tableware in the storerooms and during the banquets, as well as the responsibility of cutting and serving wine, was entrusted to cupbearers (zamardabbum, šāqûm).

== Aftermath and legacy ==
After the fall of Mari, the region corresponding to the former heart of the kingdom regained its independence under the line of the "Kings of Hana," who may have reigned since Terqa. One of these kings even bears the name Zimri-Lim.

Zimri-Lim appears in a Babylonian literary text, known only in fragments, which evokes the capture of Mari and Eshnunna by Hammurabi.

== See also ==
- Mari, Syria
- Investiture of Zimri-Lim
- List of Mesopotamian dynasties
