= Kurda =

Ancient Mesopotamian city-state

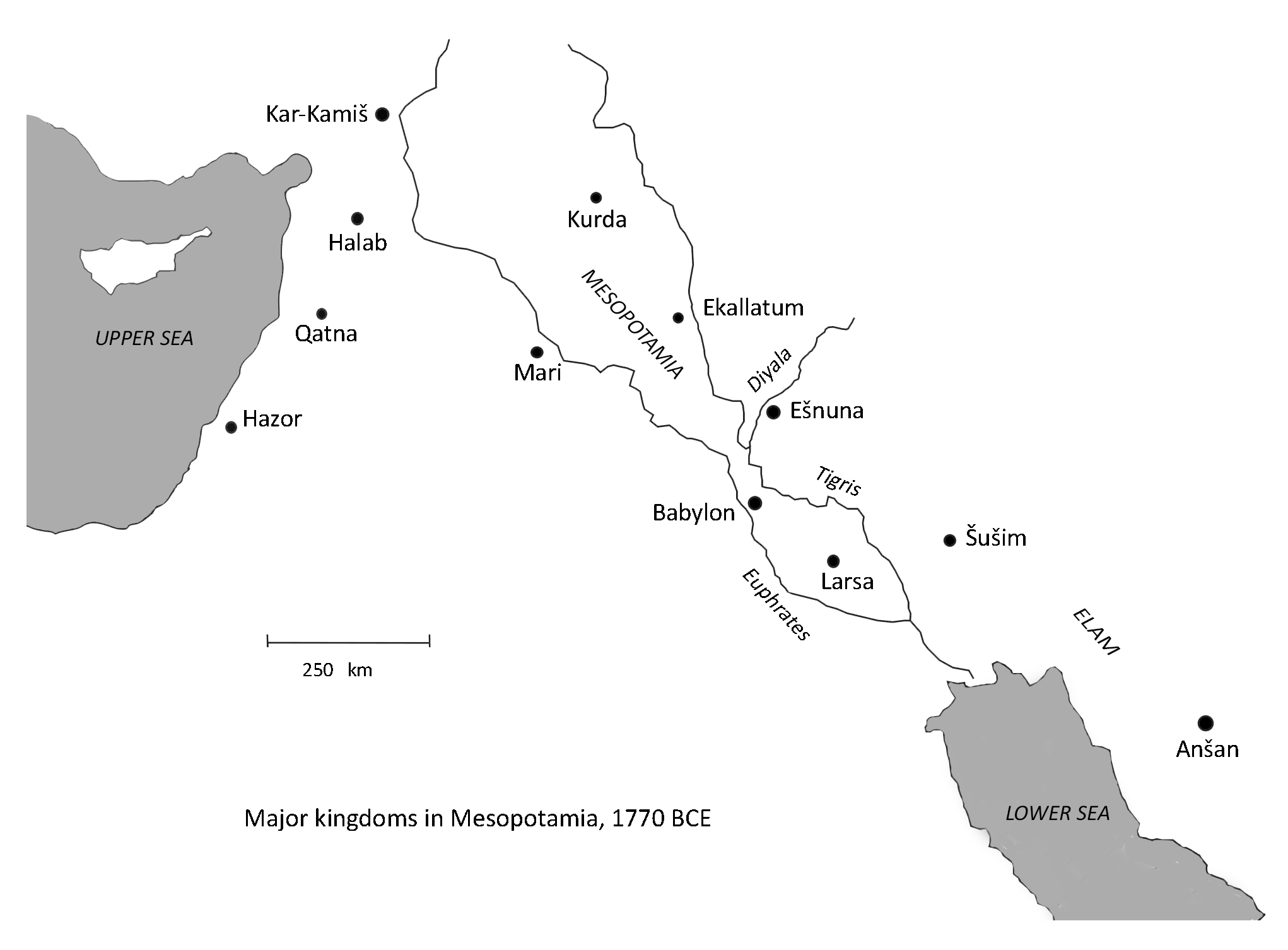
Map of Mesopotamia in 1770 BCE

Kurdâ (gur-da^{ki}) was a small ancient city-state and a Middle Bronze petty kingdom located in the region of the Sinjar Plain in Northern Mesopotamia which eventually became subsumed into Assyria. It is mentioned along with the Amorite states of Andarig and Apum.

== Location ==
At its height the kingdom might have stretched from the Upper Khabur basin in what is today north-eastern Syria, to the steppes of Sinjar mountain, modern north-western Iraq. The capital city's location is debated; it was either located to south of Sinjar mountain, or along the Khabur river.

== History ==
=== Middle Bronze ===
The city was the Amorite Numha tribe's center, it controlled a small area and included the nearby city of Kasapa. The east Semitic deity Nergal was Kurda's chief god.

In the 18th century BC, Kurda was involved in a military dispute with the neighboring kingdom of Andarig, which ended in peace. However, Kurda was later subdued by Andarig, under Atamrum, and its ally Elam. The kingdom tried switching its loyalty to Babylon but was stopped by the Elamites who were defeated by a Babylonian-Mariote alliance in 1764 BC, giving Kurda the chance to form an alliance with the kingdom of Apum to face Andarig. Various Archives of Mari around 18th century BCE mention Kurda as an independent Kingdom, sometimes in alliance with Babylon and sometimes allied with Mari.

Kurda annexed the city of Ashihum, then became a vassal of Babylon, and ended its relation with Mari in response to the latter role in supporting Andarig.

==== Middle Bronze Rulers ====
- Aštamar-Addu - contemporary of Yaḫdun-Lim, ruler of Mari and father of Zimri-Lim. He is known to have had two sons, Sumu-Numḫa and Da’irum.
- Bunû-Estar/Bina-Ištar - Said to have come from Kaspa, later the capital of Kurda. Went into exile in Zalwar while Kurda was under the control of the Kingdom of Upper Mesopotamia ruled by Šamši-Adad I. At one point Šamši-Adad I demanded his return and a mutilated person was sent instead as a ploy. Bunû-Estar wrote "When a while back I lived in Zalbar, Samsi-Addu wrote the king of Zalbar for my return. Saying ‘Fine,’ the king of Zalbar managed to substitute for me a man turned empty ...".
- Simaḫlânê/Simah-ilanê
- Bunû-Estar - At some point early in the reign of Zimri-Lim in Mari Bunû-Estar briefly reclaimed the rule of Kurda, ejecting Simah-ilanê
- Hammurabi of Kurda - in roughly the 6th year of Zimri-Lim's rule in Mari Hammurabi, grandson of Aštamar-Addu (via Da’irum) became ruler of Kurda. He was esentially a vassal of both Turukkû and Mari, this being allowable in the Amorite political structure. He took control of the city of Kasepa, which became the capital. At one point Hammurabi of Kurda came into conflict with Qarni-Lim of Andarig and Simri-Lim required them, both being vassals, to make peace.

=== Late Bronze ===
A Kurda is also mentioned in the Tell Fekheriye tablets of the Middle Assyrian Empire kings Šalmaneser I (c. 1263–1234 BC) and Tukulti-Ninurta I (c. 1233–1198 BC), as one of the conquered territories in the Mitannian Empire.

== See also ==
- Cities of the ancient Near East
- List of Mesopotamian dynasties
- List of Mesopotamian deities
