= Yasmah-Adad =

Son of Amorite king Shamshi-Adad I

Yasmah-Adad (Yasmah-Addu, Yasmakh-Adad, Ismah-Adad, Iasmakh-Adad; from Akkadian Ia-aš-ma-aḫ-^{d}IM, in Amorite Yaśmaʿ-haddu) was the younger son of the Amorite ruler of the Kingdom of Upper Mesopotamia, Shamshi-Adad. He was put on throne of Mari by his father after a successful military attack following the assassination of Yahdun-Lim of Mari in 1796 B.C.E. He was responsible for the southwestern section of his father's kingdom (of which Mari was the capital), including the Balikh River, Habur River, and Euphrates River. Yasmah-Adad's administrative district bordered the state of Yamḫad and the Syrian steppe (inhabited by semi-nomadic peoples). His father controlled the northern part of the kingdom from Shubat-Enlil, and his older brother, Ishme-Dagan, was governor over the southeast area from Ekallatum. Yasmah-Adad's leadership of Mari and the surrounding districts around the Euphrates ended when his father died, and the Amorite Zimri-Lim and his army chased him out of Mari and took his throne in 1775 B.C. The sources do not fully agree, but he was either chased out of his borders or killed before being allowed to flee.

== Political marriage ==
Shamshi-Adad I played a major role in his son's life and frequently micromanaged his son's affairs. In one instance, to facilitate a military alliance with the western Syrian city-state of Qatna, an ally in the fight against the enemy state of Yamkhad, Shamshi-Adad I arranged for his son's marriage to Princess Beltum, the daughter of the king of Qatna, Ishi-Adad. Shamshi-Adad I and Beltum's father both wished her to have a leading role in the palace, but Yasmah-Adad was already married to the daughter of Yahdun-Lim, who was Yasmah-Adad's leading wife at Mari. As a result, he relegated Beltum, his second wife, to a secondary position in the palace. Shamshi-Adad I was angry with Yasmah-Adad for his refusal to follow orders, and forced him to keep Beltum by his side in the palace.

== Criticism from his family ==
Yasmah-Adad is best known for the criticism he received from his father. Yasmah-Adad was accused of being lazy, self indulgent and not applying himself to his kingly duties. He was once chided for dallying with women and abandoning his duties for his sexual pleasures. The correspondence between the father and sons was found in the archives of the city of Mari and provides an interesting and at times humorous look into the dynamics of this family. Yasmah-Adad was ridiculed frequently by both his brother Ishme-Dagan and his father, and accused of inactive leadership over his district. His character was attacked in a letter from his father, which asks, "How long do we have to guide you in every matter? Are you a child, and not an adult? Don't you have a beard on your chin? When are you going to take charge of your house? Don't you see that your brother is leading vast armies? So, you too, take charge of your palace, your house!" Another letter from his father indicates Shamshi-Adad I's irritation with his youngest son's behavior, comparing Yasmah-Adad to his older brother, a successful warrior: "While here your brother is victorious, down there you lie about among the women." Many of these critiques arose from Yasmah-Adad's failure to perform his political duties, regardless of what his father was doing. It was Yasmah-Adad's responsibility to fill certain positions in his district, such as a governor of Terqa, and to delegate the position of mayor for the Mari palace, and his failure to fulfill these duties was the basis of many of his father's terse letters.

Yasmah-Adad's critiques did not come solely from his father, as correspondence between him and his older brother demonstrates. Ishme-Dagan scolds his brother, "Why are you setting up a wail about this thing? That is not great conduct", and advises him to communicate with their father through him as intermediary. This might have been out of a desire to help his younger brother, but could also have been a maneuver to gain Ishme-Dagan more political standing. He indicates his desire to be the intermediary between his brother and father in letters with such phrases as, "Write me what you are intending to write to the king, so that, where possible, I can advise you myself." Another example of the complicated, strained relationship between the brothers is found in a letter by Yasmah-Adad to Ishme-Dagan: "Thus (speaks) Yasmah-Addu, Your son. I listened to the Tablet which Daddy sent me, which ran as follow: 'How much longer do we have to keep you on a leading rein? You are a child, you are not a man, you have no beard on your chin! How much longer are you going to fail running your household properly? Don't you realize that your brother is commanding enormous armies? so you (jolly well) command your palace and household properly!' That is what Daddy wrote to me. Now, how can I be a child and incapable of directing affairs when daddy promoted me? How is it that, although I grew up with Daddy from when I was tiny, now some servant or other has succeeded in ousting me from Daddy's affections? So I am coming to Daddy right now, to have it out with daddy about my unhappiness!" (ARM 1.108: Dalley 1984;34) Historical opinion of Yasmah-Adad revolves mainly around these letters, the most abundant primary sources about him. The criticism may reflect the stress that Shamshi-Adad I felt as his newly formed empire began to crumble, considering, as Yasmah-Adad points out in this letter, that his father appointed Yasmah-Adad as a chief ruler of Mari, one of the largest urban centers, as well as one of the most disputed in his kingdom, when one of his generals could have filled the position. Most primary sources from the era do not mention any military action on his part. When his father died, Zimri-Lim was able to chase Yasmah-Adad out of the throne in Mari seemingly without much of a fight, while Ishme-Dagan lost control of all of his portion of his father's kingdom except Ekallatum and Assur.

== Military brutality ==
Letters between Yasmah-Adad and Shamshi-Adad I show the role he played in his father’s brutal expansionist military campaign of 1781 B.C.E., particularly in regards with the Ya’ilanum tribe. Whereas letters and inscriptions describing other battles reveal a non-violent treatment of captured enemies, letters to Yasmah-Adad contained instructions to kill all the members of this tribe. "Give an order that the sons (of the tribe) of Ya'ilanum, all those who are with you, must die tonight ... They must die and be buried in the graves!" Later, in a letter to Yasmah-Adad, Ishme-Dagan I described the execution of the Yai’ilanum. "Mar-Addu and all the sons (of the tribe) of Ya’ilanum were killed, and all its servants and soldiers were killed, and not one enemy escaped. Rejoice!" Mar-Addu, as the leader of the Ya’ilanum tribe, was decapitated and his head was brought to Yasmah-Addu.

== Other family communication ==
Although military campaigns and criticism found in letters from both his father and brother depict Yashmah-Adad in a less than capable light, a Mari letter (c. 1791–1776 B.C.E.) provides us with a glimpse into the family dynamic. This message from Ishme-Dagan I, his brother requests Yashmah-Adad to share the medical expertise with his physician before returning him. "The medication which your physician applied to me in a dressing is extremely good. The wound has begun to disappear; and slowly, slowly, the medication is about to remove it. Now, I am sending to you with this letter the physician Samsi-Addu-tukuld; let him have a look at the medicine and then send him back immediately."

== See also ==
- Chronology of the ancient Near East
- Cities of the Ancient Near East
- List of Mesopotamian deities
- List of Mesopotamian dynasties
- Short chronology timeline
