= Tell Khoshi =

Archaeological site in Iraq

- Location within Iraq
- 36°11′42″N 41°50′6″E
- Type: settlement
- Periods: Bronze Age
- Cultures: Early Dynastic, Akkadian Period, Ur III period
- Location: Nineveh Governorate, Iraq

History
- Built: c. 2600 BC
- Abandoned: Early 2nd millennium BC

Site notes
- Excavation dates: 1939, 1989, 2001–2002
- Archaeologists: Seton Lloyd, Christine Kepinski
- Condition: Ruined
- Owner: Public
- Public access: Yes

Tell Khoshi is an ancient Near East archaeological site in Nineveh Governorate of Iraq. It is located 14 km south of Beled Sinjar. It has been suggested as the location of Andarig, though so far the site's archaeology is somewhat too early in time for that to work.

== History ==
Tell Khoshi was occupied from the Early Dynastic period into the Early 2nd millennium BC but primarily during the Akkadian and UR III periods. Its peak occupation came during the same time, with similar ceramic assemblages, as other northern sites like Tell Taya, Tell Hadhail, Tell Leilan, and Tell Chuera.

== Archaeology ==
The site was first noted in a survey of archaeological sites in the Sinjar region of Iraq by Seton Lloyd in the mid-1930s.

In 1939, the Tell Khoshi site was worked for seven days by Lloyd, under the auspices of the Liverpool Institute of Archaeology. He found an oval-shaped walled city running roughly 1 kilometer north to south. It contained two mounds, a large citadel mount (A) in the northwest with a smaller mound (B) somewhat to the south of that along the city wall. Lloyd only briefly examined mound A, working mainly on B, where he found a large building. The building had two levels, with Level One provisionally dated to the Akkadian period and Level Two to the Early Dynastic period. Finds included copper nails and bolts, typically used with wooden doors, and various pottery shards. The building on Level Two showed indications of destruction and burning.

Work resumed under Christine Kepinski, with a site survey in 1989. They found a fortified walled oval city extending 1150 meters north to south and 800 meters east to west, roughly 100 hectares. As noted by Lloyd, it contained two mounds (A and B as above) in the northeast, about 20 meters high, with a lower town running 6 to 10 meters high. The remains of the city wall rose from 8 to 10 meters. Pottery found dates to the Akkadian (originally identified as Nineveh 5 by Lloyd) and Ur III periods. Two 15-meter deep pits were found in the lower town, dug by local farmers seeking water. Excavation seasons occurred in 2001 and 2002.

== See also ==
- Cities of the ancient Near East
