= Yahdun-Lim =

King of Mari

King of Mari
- Reign: c. 1820 – c. 1797 BC
- Predecessor: Yaggid-Lim
- Successor: Sumu-Yamam
- Died: c. 1797 BC
- Father: Yaggid-Lim

Yahdun-Lim (died c. 1797 BC) was the "king of Mari, Tuttul, and the Land of Hana" in early Middle Bronze IIA (c. 1820-1750 BCE).

== Family ==
Yahdun-Lim (or Yakhdunlim, Yahdunlim; from Akkadian ia-aḫ-du-un-li-im, in Amorite Yaʿdun-lîm) was of Amorite origin, and became king after the death of his father Yaggid-Lim.

== Reign ==
Yahdun-Lim built Mari up to become one of the major powers of the region. He led a successful campaign to the coast of the Mediterranean Sea.

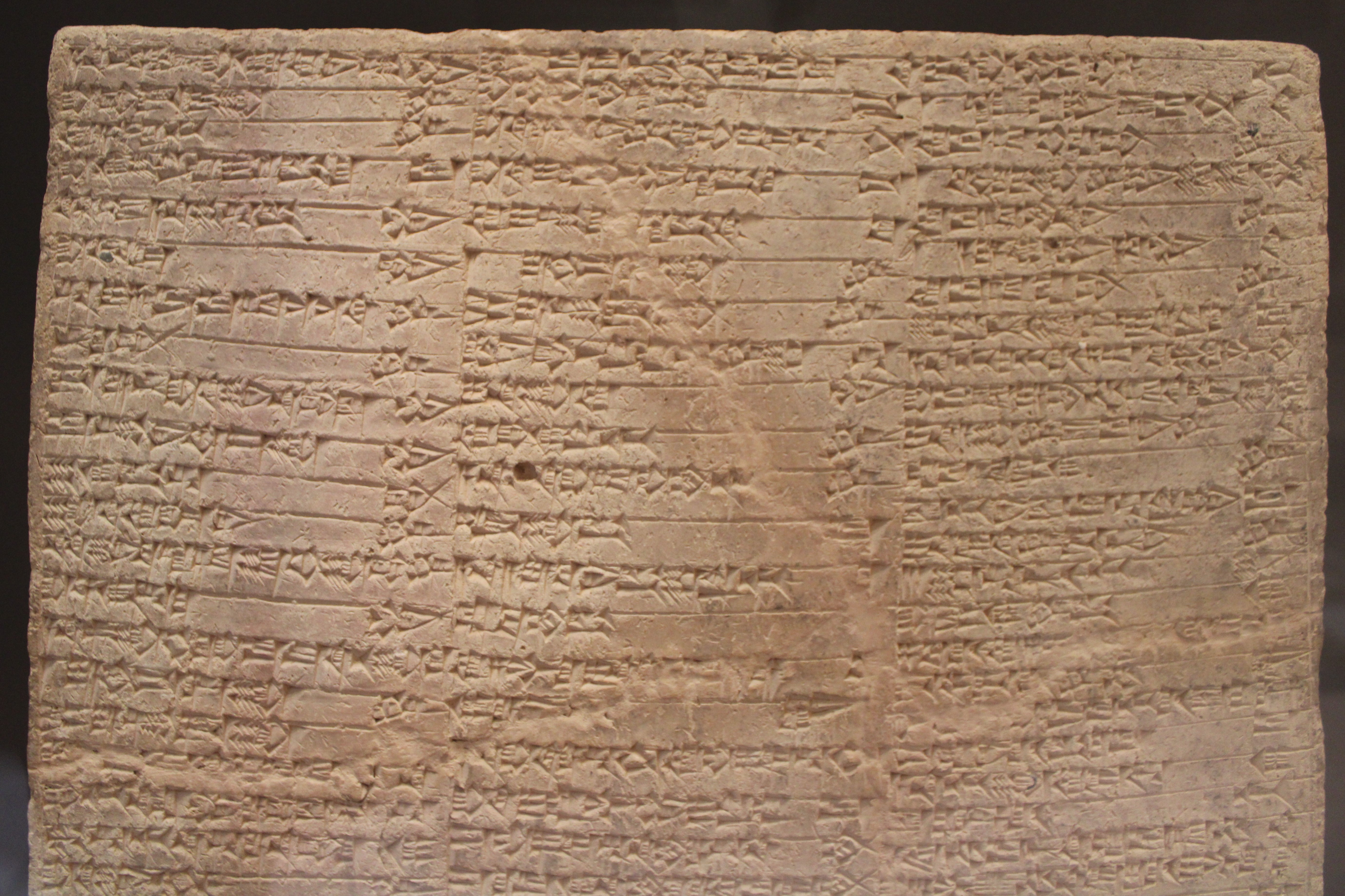
An inscription of Yahdun-Lim

Yahdun-Lim started his reign by subduing seven of his rebelling tribal leaders, and rebuilding the walls of Mari and Terqa in addition to building a new fort which he named Dur-Yahdun-Lim.

Yahdun-Lim's kingdom was threatened by incursions from various nomad tribes, such as the Canaanites, but he was able to subjugate them and force them to pay tribute. After having established internal peace, he built a temple to the god Shamash.

=== West ===
He then expanded west and claimed to have reached the Mediterranean Sea, however he later had to face a rebellion by the Yaminite nomads who were centered at Tuttul, and the rebels were supported by Yamhad's king Sumu-Epuh, whose interests were threatened by the recently established alliance between Yahdun-Lim and Eshnunna. Yahdun-Lim defeated the Yaminites but an open war with Yamhad was avoided.

Kingdoms in the west:

- Sumu-Epuh of Yamhad (Aleppo) expanding into a great kingdom.
- Amut-pi-el I of Qatna with trade routes via Palmyra.

=== Northeast ===
In the northeast, Yahdun-Lim then became occupied by his rivalry with Shamshi-Adad I of Shubat-Enlil (r. 1808-1775 BCE), the son of the late Ila-kabkabu.

=== East ===
In the east, Yahdun-Lim had entered an alliance with Eshnunna.

- Naram-Sin of Eshnunna
- Dadusha of Eshnunna

=== Assassination ===
He received pleas for help from kings threatened by Shamshi-Adad's expansionist plans. But before Yahdun-Lim could move against Shamshi-Adad, he was assassinated c. 1798 BC by his possible son Sumu-Yamam, who himself got assassinated two years after ascending the throne.

According to William J. Hamblin, Yahdun-Lim was killed in a battle with Shamshi-Adad c. 1796 BC. Shamshi-Adad then assigned his son Yasmah-Adad to the lordship of Mari.

In the chaos that followed, Shamshi-Adad advanced and annexed Mari. The war ended in a defeat for Mari.

Zimri-Lim, Yakhdunlim's son and heir, was forced to flee to Aleppo, where he would remain as an exile until Shamshi-Adad's death.

Yahdul-Lim of Carchemish may also be sometimes referred to as Yahdun-Lim.

== Attestations ==
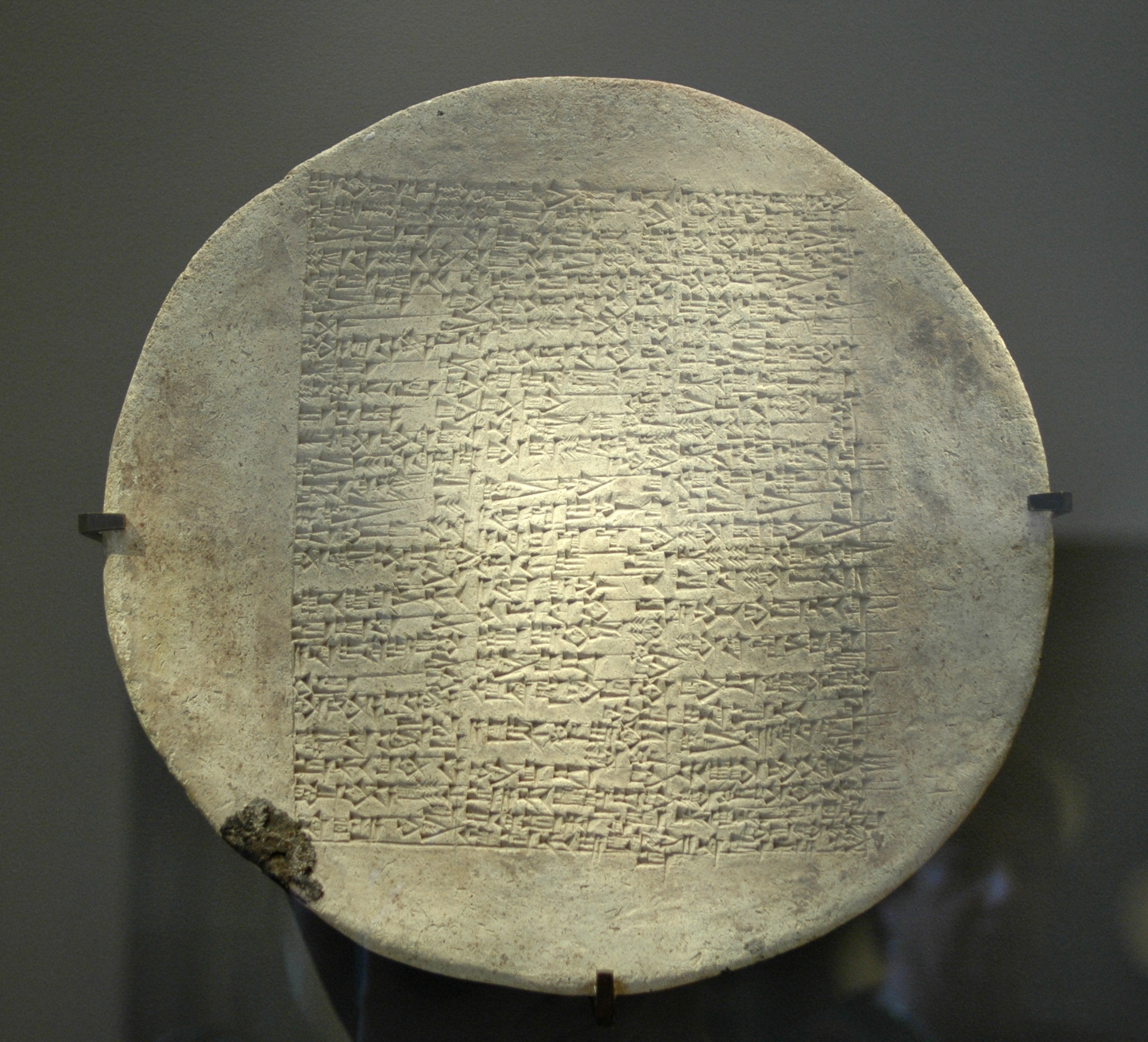
Yahdun-Lim's inscription on a disk

Louvre AO 18236 | c. 1800 BCE | Inscription on a cone found in the palace of Mari recounting the works of the ruler and the foundation of the Dür-Yahdun-Lîm fort.

"Yahdun-Lim, son of Yaggid-Lim, king of Mari, Tuttul, and the land of Hana, mighty king who controls the banks of the Euphrates. [The god] Dagan proclaimed my kingship. He gave me the powerful weapon that fells my enemies. As a result, I took prisoner seven kings who had fought against me. I annexed their lands. I undid the damage to the banks of the Euphrates and restored peace to my land. I opened canals. I caused my land to lose the habit of drawing water. I built the wall of Mari and dug its moat. Moreover, in a parched land, in a place of thirst, which no king had ever named, where no king had ever built a city, I conceived a desire; I built there a city, I dug its moat... I enlarged my country, the foundations of Mari, and I strengthened my land. Thus I made my name eternal."

== See also ==
- Royal Palace of Mari

== Literature ==
- Bryce, Trevor (2009). The Routledge Handbook of the Peoples and Places of Ancient Western Asia. Routledge. ISBN 978-1-134-15908-6.
- Bryce, Trevor (2014). Ancient Syria: A Three Thousand Year History. Oxford University Press. ISBN 978-0-19-100292-2.
- Fowden, Garth (21 November 2013). Before and After Muhammad: The First Millennium Refocused. Princeton University Press. ISBN 978-1-4008-4816-4.
- Frayne, Douglas (1990). Old Babylonian Period (2003–1595 BC). The Royal Inscriptions of Mesopotamia Early Periods. Vol. 4. University of Toronto Press. ISBN 978-0-8020-5873-7.
- Launderville, Dale (2003). Piety and Politics: The Dynamics of Royal Authority in Homeric Greece, Biblical Israel, and Old Babylonian Mesopotamia. Wm. B. Eerdmans Publishing. ISBN 978-0-8028-4505-4.
- Pitard, Wayne T. (2001) [1998]. "Before Israel: Syria-Palestine in the Bronze Age". In Coogan, Michael David (ed.). The Oxford History of the Biblical World (revised ed.). Oxford University Press. ISBN 978-0-19-513937-2.
- Van Der Meer, Petrus (1955) [1947]. The Chronology of Ancient Western Asia and Egypt. Documenta et Monumenta Orientis Antiqui. Vol. 2 (2 ed.). Brill. OCLC 4727997.
