= Atamrum =

Ruler of Andarig in Mesopotamia

King of Andarig
- Reign: 17th century BC
- Predecessor: Qarni-Lim

Atamrum (a-tam-ri-im) ruled the ancient Near East city-state of Andarig after ruling Allaḫad. Later he was able to reclaim the rulership of Allaḫad as well (after the death of Atamrum his brother Hulalum succeeded him on the throne of Allaḫad). It has been suggested that the father of Atamrum and Hulalum was named Warad-Sin who may or may not be the Larsa ruler and son of Kudur-Mabuk considered "the father of the Emutbal". The Emutbal people were the principal population of Andarig. He is currently only thought to have ruled for 2 or 3 years in Andarig and an unknown time in Allaḫad. One text (A.96) held the line "‘[Swear] by Šamaš of [Heaven]!’ Atamrum, son of Warad-Sin, king of Andarig, swore".

Atamrum came to power under the auspices of Eshnunna at which point most of the high-ranking officials loyal to the previous king Qarni-Lim as well as his sons were executed. One official that survived, Himdiya (Himdija), became a supporter of Atamrum and ended up succeeding him in Andarig. Himdiya is known to have married a daughter of Hammurabi and is said by a few sources to have been the son of Atamrum but that is far from certain. After the fall of the Kingdom of Upper Mesopotamia the power vacuum in northern Mesopotamia was contested by Mari and Babylon to the west and Eshnunna (often allied with Elam) in the east with a number of smaller players like Andarig coming under the control of one power or another or brefly acting independently. After the Kingdom of Upper Mesopotamia fell its capital of Šubat-Enlil was sacked by Elam and occupied shortly thereafter by Atamrum, executing the then ruler Haya-abum, and then occupied by his successor Himdiya. Early on Šubat-Enlil it had been held by Šubat-Enlil. At one point Atamrum was sent gifts (a throne brought to him, accompanied by royal attire) and a treaty proposal (ARM 26/2 372) by Hammurabi of Babylon "Be enemy [to my enemies] and [be friend] with my friends.". Atamrum politely declined based on already being pledged to Eshnunna. At that point Babylon was still a minor power, not expanding until later in the reign of Hammurabi. At this point Eshnunna and Elam fell out and Eshnunna was occupied by Elamite forces. Atamrum shifted his allegiance to Elam at this point and was chosen by the Elamite ruler to govern Eshnunna. Elam them moved against Mari. In a text from Mariote general Yasim-Dagan to Zimri-Lim it states

"“The *sukkal* of Elam addressed Hammurabi in these terms: “Atamrum is the chosen one (to rule Eshnunna). Finish what you must do while I reside here. The cities of Eshnunna that you control—are they not mine? Evacuate them and submit them to my yoke! Otherwise, I shall plunder your country from top to bottom. The army will march from... ...Mankisum and will cross the river toward this site. At the head of my army, I will cross the river and invade your country.” This is what the Sukkal of Elam wrote to Hammurabi. A copy of the tablet he sent also reached Atamrum, the troop commanders, and me; he is burning with the desire to wage war against the lord of Babylon.”"

At that point Atamrum shifted his allegiance to Mari and Zimri-Lim. During much of Atamrum's reign Andarig was a vassal state to Zimri-Lim of Mari. He abandoned Eshnunna and Elam and signed a vassalage treaty, known from several texts (ARM XXVI/2, 372, 401, 404), with Zimri-Lim. The treaty signed between them stated that Atamrum would never for all his life commit "any hostile act against Zimri-Lim, son of Yahdun-Lim, King of Mari and of the Bedouin land, nor against his city, his army, or his land". At one point Atamrum was visiting Zimri-Lim and Ibbatum, the principal wife of Atamrum and daughter of Zimri-Lim, was in charge of Andarig. In one text to Assyrian traders she wrote

"When the message came from the city of Assur to you, that these men would travel through the interior of your country, why did I not get this message? Or why did you not yourself write to me about their passage to the north? I want to know (things like this). Today Atamrum, the king of this country, is not at home. He is staying in Babylon. But this country belongs to Zimri-Lim, my lord. When I held the men, I wrote to Zimri-Lim. Is it proper to release the men over the head of my lord, Zimri-Lim? As long as no decision about the men comes from my lord, those men will not pass through the gates"

The vassal status of Atamrum under Zimri-Lim was contentious at times. When Atamrum arrived at the siege of Larsa he was billeted at an outlying fortification and demanded to be moved to the higher status camp of Zimri-Lim "sleep in the encampment of my father Zimri-Lim’s army". It is known that Atamrum brought seven vassals of his own into the vassalage. Atamrum apparently had a taste for good wine. He sent his wine steward to Mari to make sure it wa properly selected. In a Mari text:

"My lord had instructed me about jars of wine to take for Atamrum from the boats belonging to men from Imar. With Mannu-balu-Šamaš, the wine-steward of Atamrum standing at my side, I had as many wine jars as there were on these ships brought out. 90 jars of good wine were selected and the remaining jars of inferior wine were turned back. I have had these 90 jars of wine loaded, and assigned a boatman as escort to Atamrum’s wine-steward."

At this point the city of Babylon under Hammurabi came into ascendancy and conquered the nation of Larsa. Atamrum promptly shifted his allegiance to Babylon. While with a Babylonian army traveling to Andarig Atamrum then "died suddenly" and the Babylonians occupied the city of Andarig. Inbatum, the first wife of Atamrum and daughter of Zimri-Lim, was stripped of her rank in favor or the first wife of Atamrum and his children (though she was not stripped of her garments indicated she retained some level of status) and she then requested to be returned to her father Zimri-Lim. Himdiya was then installed as ruler of Andarig by Babylon and given Inbatum as a wife.

Atamrum came into conflict with Bunu-Ishtar of Kurdâ, a conflict that had begun under the predecessor of Atamrum at Andarig, Qarni-Lim. the conflict continued under Hammurabi of Kurda. At that time both nations were vassals of Zimri-Lim of Mari and he sent an envoy to try and bring peace between them. At one point Atamrum formed an aliance with Ashkur-Addu, the king of Karanâ/Qattarâ. Atamrum had dealing with many polities in the region. When a general of Asqur-Addu of Karana launched a failed coup in Qattara, under the control of Asqur-Addu, and fled to Andarig, Atamrum extradited them, getting 5 criminals sought by Atamrum in Karana.

In a text, Buqâqum, reports that he is staying with Atamrum at Harrâdum on a journey from Babylon to Andarig.

== Siege of Razama ==
Atamrum is best known for a siege of the city of Razama in the 10th regnal year of Mari ruler Zimri-Lim (c. 18th century BC), known from several Mari texts. Razama which was ruled by Šarriya/Šarraya (Šarrum-kīma-kalima), a vassal of Zimri-Lim. The army consisted of troops from Eshnunna and Elam. There was a long, and unsuccessful siege of the city. The defenders practiced a strategy of active defense "When troops arrived at Razama, when they arrived, the troops of the city came out and killed 700 Elamites and 600 Eshnunakeans". They also dropped bitumen on the attacker's siege towers and burned them. After a siege ramp was constructed it was attacked:

... Citizens made a tunnel in the city. They made two holes in the wall, right and left toward the front of the ramp. At night they entered [that] tunnel, and in the early morning, the troops of the city [came] out and killed half of the troops (of Atamrum). They made them drop the bronze lances and their shields and brought them inside the city.

The siege was lifted with the arrival of the army of Zimri-Lim.

== See also ==
- Chronology of the ancient Near East
- List of Mesopotamian dynasties
