= Yaggid-Lim =

King of Mari, Syria (19th century BC)

King of Mari
- Reign: c. 1830 – c. 1820 BC
- Successor: Yahdun-Lim
- Died: c. 1820 BC
- Issue: Yahdun-Lim

Yaggid-lim (Iagitlim; died c. 1820 BC) was king of Mari during the 19th century BC. He was probably of Amorite origin. Little is known about his reign except that he came into conflict with his neighbour Ila-kabkabu of Terqa after the two had first been allies. Iagitlim was succeeded by his son Yahdun-Lim.
