= Andarig =

Mesopotamian kingdom

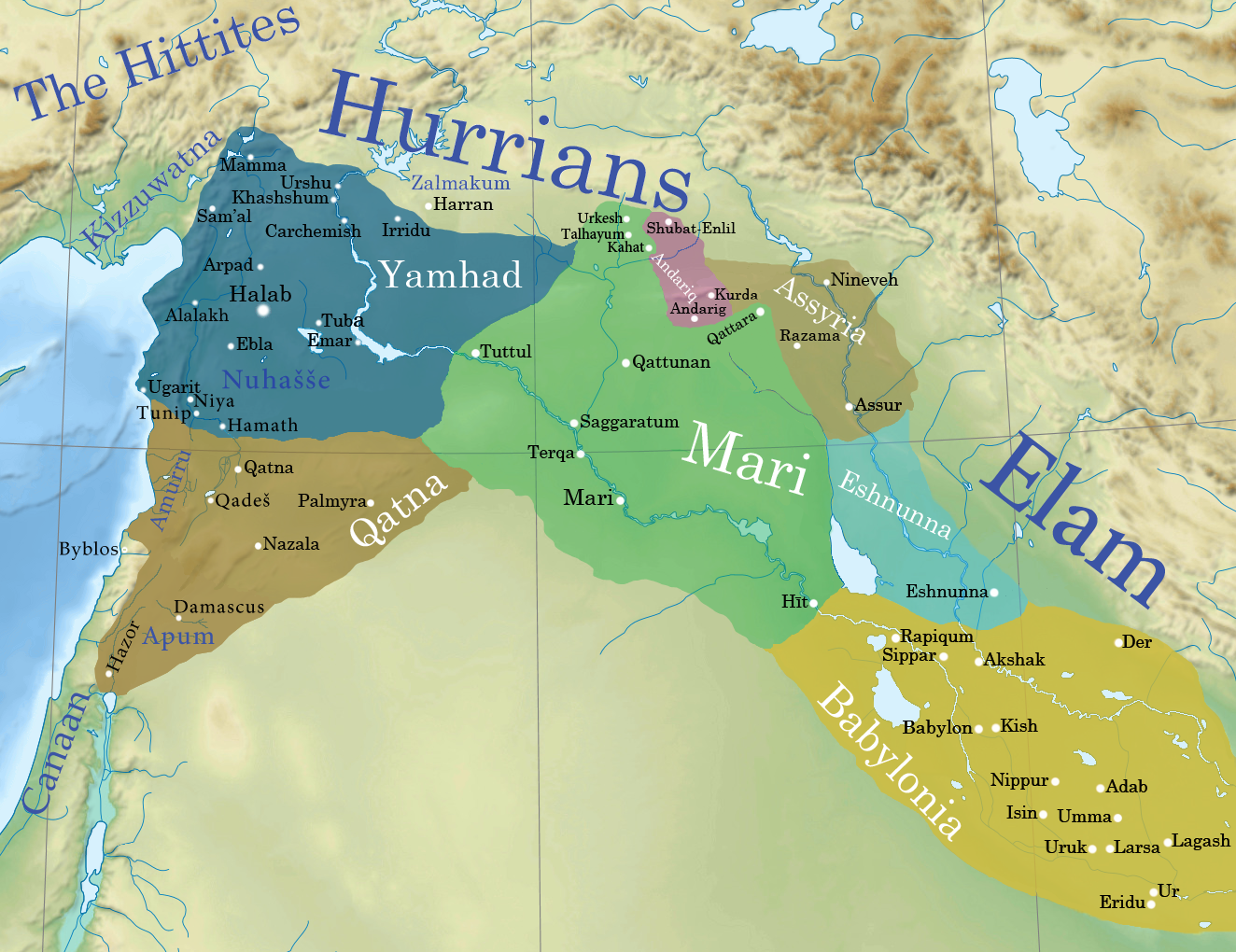
A map depicting the borders of empires in Mesopotamia.

Andarig or Andariq was a Middle Bronze Age kingdom in the Sinjar Plain region of northern Mesopotamia, located between the Habur and Tigris river. It is mentioned several times in the documents found in Mari. Andarig was one of the largest and most powerful kingdoms in the region. It was the most important holding of the Amorite Yamutbal tribe.

== Qarni-Lim ==
Qarni-Lim was the first known King of Andarig, who ruled from 1770–1766 B.C.E. He conquered Apum, and put his son Zuzu in charge of it, although Zuzu died shortly after falling off the city wall. After that, Qarni-Lim lost Apum to Elam. Qarni-Lim was initially an ally of Eshnunna but later sided with the Mariote King, Zimri-Lim, with whom he later got into a feud, resulting in a siege of the city. Andarig later voluntarily became a vassal of the Amorite ruler Shamshi-Adad, which led to a revolution in the city, resulting in the assassination of Qarni-Lim, who was beheaded in 1766.

== Atamrum ==
Following the death of Qarni-Lim, troops from Eshnunna occupied Andarig and gave the throne to the populist leader Atamrum, the son of Warad-Sim, king of Allahad. Andarig became independent under its new King, who aligned himself with the Elamite King who had just launched a major offensive in Mesopotamia in 1765. Following this, Atamrum once again allied himself with Zimri-Lim, who helped him take the city of Razama. Although any alliance with Mari ended when the kingdom was conquered by Hammurabi.

== Himdiya ==
After Atamrum died, his son Himdiya (Himdija) succeeded him. He established an alliance with Hazi-Teshub, the King of Razama, in opposition to a bloc formed by Mutiya and Shtamar-Adad, the kings of Apum and Kurda, respectively. Himdiya conquered Apum and ruled it for two years; however, he was later defeated by Kurda, who incorporated Andrig into their kingdom. Andarig finally came to an end when it was conquered by Hammurabi and ruled by his vassal Aqba-Hammu.

== Buriya/Burija ==
He is attested as the sender of 10 letters to his "brother" Till-Abnu, ruler of Apum, and appears as a king of Andarig. The chronology is not given. Till-Abnu received letters from several rulers, including Astamar-Adad of Kurda and Mutija. Astamar-Adad was allied with Mutija and Sepallu against Andarig and Razama. Burija was allied with Hazip-Tessup of Razama (Tell al-Hawa?).
