= Tell Leilan =

Archaeological site in Syria

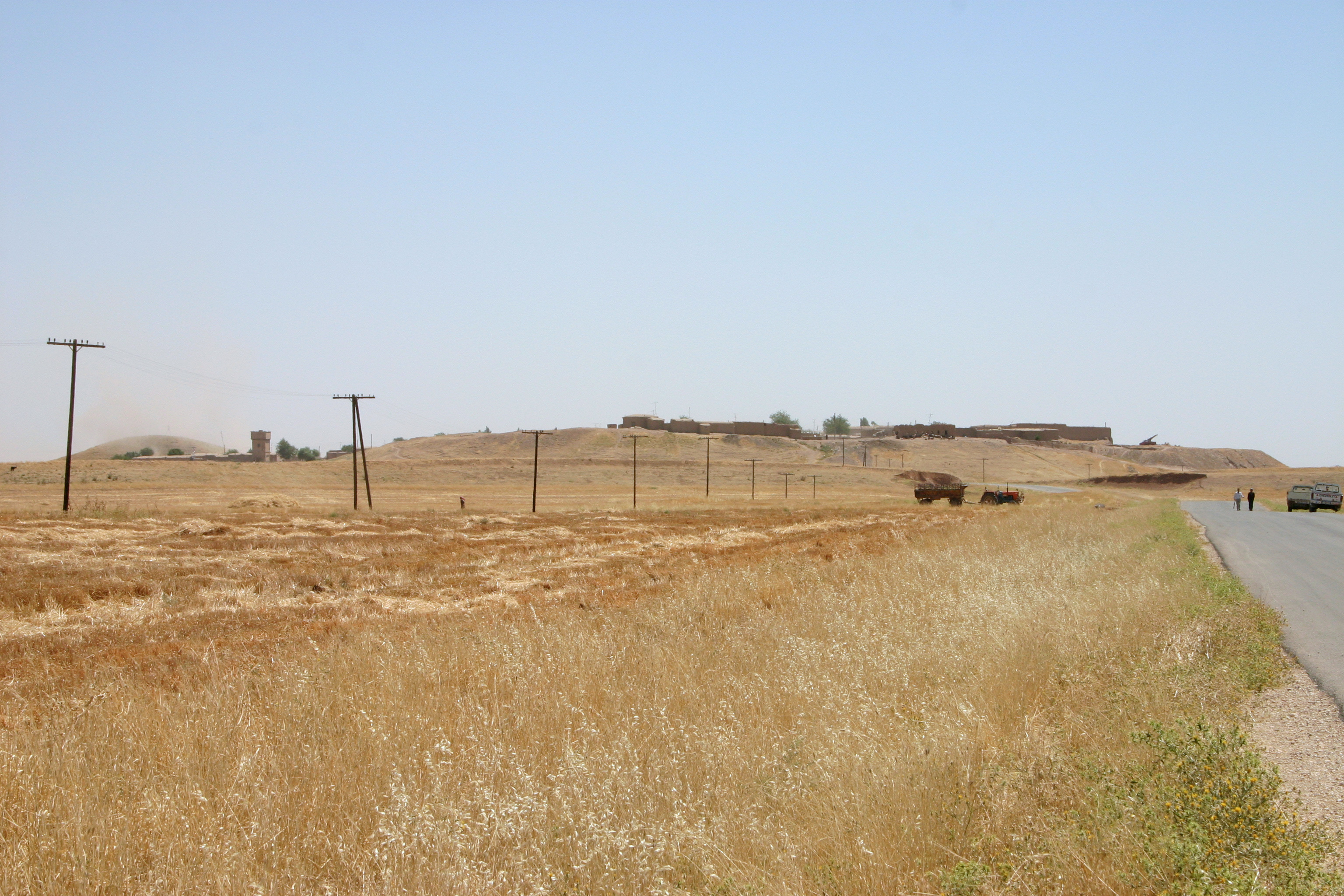
- View of Tell Leilan

- Location within Syria
- 36°57′26″N 41°30′19″E
- Type: Settlement
- Cultures: Akkadian, Assyrian
- Location: Al-Hasakah Governorate, Syria

History
- Built: 5000 BC
- Abandoned: 1726 BC

Site notes
- Condition: In ruins

Tell Leilan (Shekhna) is an archaeological site situated near the Wadi Jarrah in the Khabur River basin in Al-Hasakah Governorate, northeastern Syria. The site has been occupied since the 5th millennium BC. During the late third millennium, the site was known as Shekhna. During that time it was under control of the Akkadian Empire and was used as an administrative center. Around 1800 BC, the site was renamed "Šubat-Enlil" by the king Shamshi-Adad I Amorite ruler of the Kingdom of Upper Mesopotamia, and it became his residential capital. Shubat-Enlil was abandoned around 1700 BC.

== Geography ==
Map of the Khabur Basin during the Bronze Age showing the location of Tell Leilan in relation to other important sites

The site is located close to some other flourishing cities of the time. Hamoukar is about 50 km away to the southeast. Tell Brak is about 50 km away to the southwest, and also in the Khabur River basin. Tell Mozan (Urkesh) is about 50 km to the west.

Leilan, Brak and Urkesh were particularly prominent during the Akkadian period.

== History ==
=== Chalcolithic ===
The city originated around 5000 BC as a small farming village.

=== Early Bronze ===
==== Early Bronze III ====
The Early Bronze III (c. 2750-2350 BC) began with a period of optimal climate conditions during the EB IIIA (c. 2750-2500 BC) allowing the growth of urban city-states, followed by a shift to drier conditions in EB IIIB (c. 2500-2350 BC) causing urban intensification and political turmoil competing for resources. In Mesopotamia, the EB IIIA correlates with Early Dynastic II-IIIA, while EB IIIB is represented by Early Dynastic IIIB.

Early Dynastic IIIA/Ninevite 5. It grew to be a large city c. 2600 BC, three hundred years before the Akkadian Empire. The city had a large wall by c. 2600 BC. A number of finds from the Ninevite 5 period were found at the site.

==== Early Bronze IV ====
The Early Bronze IV (c. 2350-2000 BC) encompassed the EB IVA (Akkadian period) and EB IVB (Ur III period). The EB IV began with climate change (c. 2350 BC), changed from EB IVA to EB IVB due to a climate change (c. 2200 BC) and ended with a climate change (c. 2036 BCE). During this time, Northern Mesopotamia experienced drier conditions.

Drought. A 3-foot layer of sediment at Tell Leilan containing no evidence of human habitation offered clues as to the cause of the demise of the Akkadian imperial city; analysis indicated that at around 2200 BC, a three-century drought was severe enough to affect agriculture and settlement.

=== Middle Bronze ===
==== Middle Bronze IIA ====
Shubat-Enlil

Kingdom of Upper Mesopotamia
- circa 1809 BCE–circa 1776 BCE
- Capital: Shubat-Enlil
- Government: Monarchy
- King
  - circa 1809 BCE – 1776 circa BCE: Shamshi-Adad I
- Historical era: Bronze Age
  - Established: circa 1809 BCE
  - Disestablished: circa 1776 BCE
Succeeded by
Apum
- Today part of: Syria

The conquest of the region by the Amorite warlord Shamshi-Adad I (1813–1781 BC) of Ekallatum revived the abandoned site of Tell Leilan. Shamshi-Adad saw the great potential in the rich agricultural production of the region and made it the capital city of his empire. He renamed it from Shehna to Shubat-Enlil, or Šubat-Enlil, meaning "the residence of the god Enlil" in the Akkadian language. In the city a royal palace was built and a temple acropolis to which a straight paved street led from the city gate. There was also a planned residential area and the entire city was enclosed by a wall. The city size was about 90 hectares (220 acres). Shubat-Enlil may have had a population of 20,000 people at its peak.

==== Kingdom of Apum ====
After the death of Shamshi-Adad, the city became the capital of Apum and prospered until king Samsu-iluna of Babylon sacked it in 1726 BC. During this period various minor kings ruled there, including Turum-natki, Zuzu, and Haja-Abum. Qarni-Lim, king of nearby Andarig, maintained a large palace there. Later Andarig rilers Atamrum and Himdiya also held Šubat-Enlil after it was sacked by Elamites.

== Archaeology ==
Beginning in 1979 the mound of Tell Leilan was excavated by a team of archaeologists from Yale University, led by Harvey Weiss. The dig ended in 2008. Among many important discoveries at Tell Leilan is an archive of 1100 cuneiform clay tablets maintained by the rulers of the city. These tablets date to the eighteenth century BC and record the dealings with other Mesopotamian states and how the city administration worked. Finds from the excavations at Tell Leilan are on display in the Deir ez-Zor Museum.

== Tell Mohammad Diyab ==
The site of Tell Mohammed Diyab is located 7 km southeast of Tell Leilan. Its total area is about 50 ha, and the main tell is about 12 ha. Excavations revealed significant findings from the Amorite period, including at the time of Shamshi-Adad I. There are two distinct cities at the site. Excavations started in 1992.

== See also ==
- Cities of the ancient Near East
- Short chronology timeline
- List of Mesopotamian dynasties
- Tell Khoshi
