= Amorite language =

Extinct ancient Semitic language

Amorite
- Native to: Levant
- Ethnicity: Amorites
- Extinct: 2nd millennium BC
- Language family: Afro-Asiatic: Semitic; West Semitic; Central Semitic; Northwest Semitic; Amorite
- Dialects: Ugaritic?

Language codes
- ISO 639-3: None (mis)
- Glottolog: amor1239

Amorite is an extinct early Semitic language, formerly spoken during the Bronze Age by the Amorite tribes prominent in ancient Near Eastern history. It is known from Ugaritic, which is classed by some as its westernmost dialect, and from non-Akkadian proper names recorded by Akkadian scribes during periods of Amorite rule in Babylonia (the end of the 3rd and the beginning of the 2nd millennium BC), notably from Mari and to a lesser extent Alalakh, Tell Harmal and Khafajah. Occasionally, such names are also found in early Egyptian texts; and one place name, "Sənīr" (שְׂנִיר) for Mount Hermon, is known from the Bible (Book of Deuteronomy, Deuteronomy 3:9).

Amorite is considered an archaic Northwest Semitic language.

Notable characteristics include the following:

- The usual Northwest Semitic imperfective-perfective distinction is found: Yantin-Dagan, 'Dagon gives' (ntn); Raṣa-Dagan, 'Dagon was pleased' (rṣy). It included a 3rd-person suffix -a (unlike Akkadian or Hebrew) and an imperfect vowel, a-, as in Arabic rather than the Hebrew and Aramaic -i-.
- There was a verb form with a geminate second consonant — Yabanni-Il, 'God creates' (root bny).
- In several cases that Akkadian has š, Amorite, like Hebrew and Arabic, has h, thus hu 'his', -haa 'her', causative h- or ʼ- (I. Gelb 1958).
- The 1st-person perfect is in -ti (singular), -nu (plural), as in the Canaanite languages.

In 2022, two large, 3,800-year-old, Amorite-Akkadian bilingual tablets were published, yielding a large corpus of Northwest Semitic. The text, in the Amorite/Canaanite languages, bears a recognizable similarity to Hebrew, and demonstrates that a spoken language very close to Hebrew existed by the second millennium BCE, rather than the first millennium BCE. Analyses on the lexicon and verbal morphology reaffirm the Northwest Semitic derivation of the language in the texts and have fine-tuned the current understanding of Amorite's position among the Semitic languages.
