= Yarim-Lim =

Yarim-Lim may refer to the following ancient kings.

- Yarim-Lim I (reigned c. 1780 BC–c. 1764 BC), king of Yamhad in modern-day Aleppo, Syria
- Yarim-Lim of Alalakh (reigned c. 1735 BC–c. ? BC), king of Alalakh in Turkey, near Syrian border
- Yarim-Lim II of Alalakh, possible second king of Alalakh who was the grandchild of the first; see Yarim-Lim of Alalakh § Yarim-Lim II of Alalakh
- Yarim-Lim II (reigned c. 1720 BC–c. 1700 BC), king of Yamhad
- Yarim-Lim III (reigned c. 1625 BC), king of Yamhad
