= Hassum =

Hurrian city-state

Hassum (also given as Khashshum, Ḫaššum, Hassu, Hassuwa or Hazuwan) was a Hurrian city-state, located in southern Turkey most probably on the Euphrates river north of Carchemish.

The exact location of the city has not been conclusively determined. Suggested sites include Tilbeshar, Oylum Höyük, Ain Dara, and Tilmen Höyük.

== History ==
=== Early Bronze ===
The city was a vassal to Ebla, it was mentioned in the Tablets of Ebla as Hazuwan, and was governed by its own king. It came under the influence of Mari for a short period of time in the 24th century BC, before Irkab-Damu of Ebla regained influence over the area, the city survived the Akkadians conquests in 2240 BC and flourished as a trade center in the first half of the 2nd millennia BC.

=== Middle Bronze ===
In the beginning of 18th century BC, Hassum allied with Yamhad against Yahdun-Lim of Mari, it later helped Yamhad against a kingdom in Zalmakum (a marshy region between the Euphrates and lower Balikh), but then shifted alliance to Shamshi-Adad I of the Kingdom of Upper Mesopotamia after he annexed Mari. The city sent him 1,000 troops to attack Sumu-Epuh of Yamhad. Later, Yarim-Lim I of Yamhad brought Hassum under his hegemony and the city remained subjugated to Yamhad until the Hittite conquest.

==== Hittite Conquest ====
In the course of his war against Yamhad, Hattusili I of the Hittites, having destroyed Alalakh and Urshu, headed toward Hassum in his sixth year (around 1644 BC, middle chronology). Yarim-Lim III of Yamhad sent his army under General Zukrassi, leader of the heavy-armed troops, accompanied by General Zaludis the commander of the Manda troops. They united with the army of Hashshum, then the battle of Atalur mountain ensued (Atalur is located north of Aleppo not very far from the Amanus, it can be identified with the Kurd-Dagh Mountains). Hattusili destroyed his enemies and moved on to burn and loot Hassum. The citizens rallied their forces three times against the Hittites, but Hattusili sacked the city and seized the statues of the god Teshub, his wife Hebat and a pair of silver bulls that were the bulls of Teshub, and carried them to Hattusa, where they were kept in the temple of Arinna. The king of Hassum was captured and humiliated, he was harnessed to one of the wagons used to transport the loot of his city and taken to the Hittite capital.

=== Late Bronze ===
A century later, Hittite king Telipinu (fl. c. 1500 BC) mentions Hassum as his chief enemy and his destruction of the city.

== See also ==
- Hurrians
- Yamhad
- History of the Hittites
