= Abba-El I =

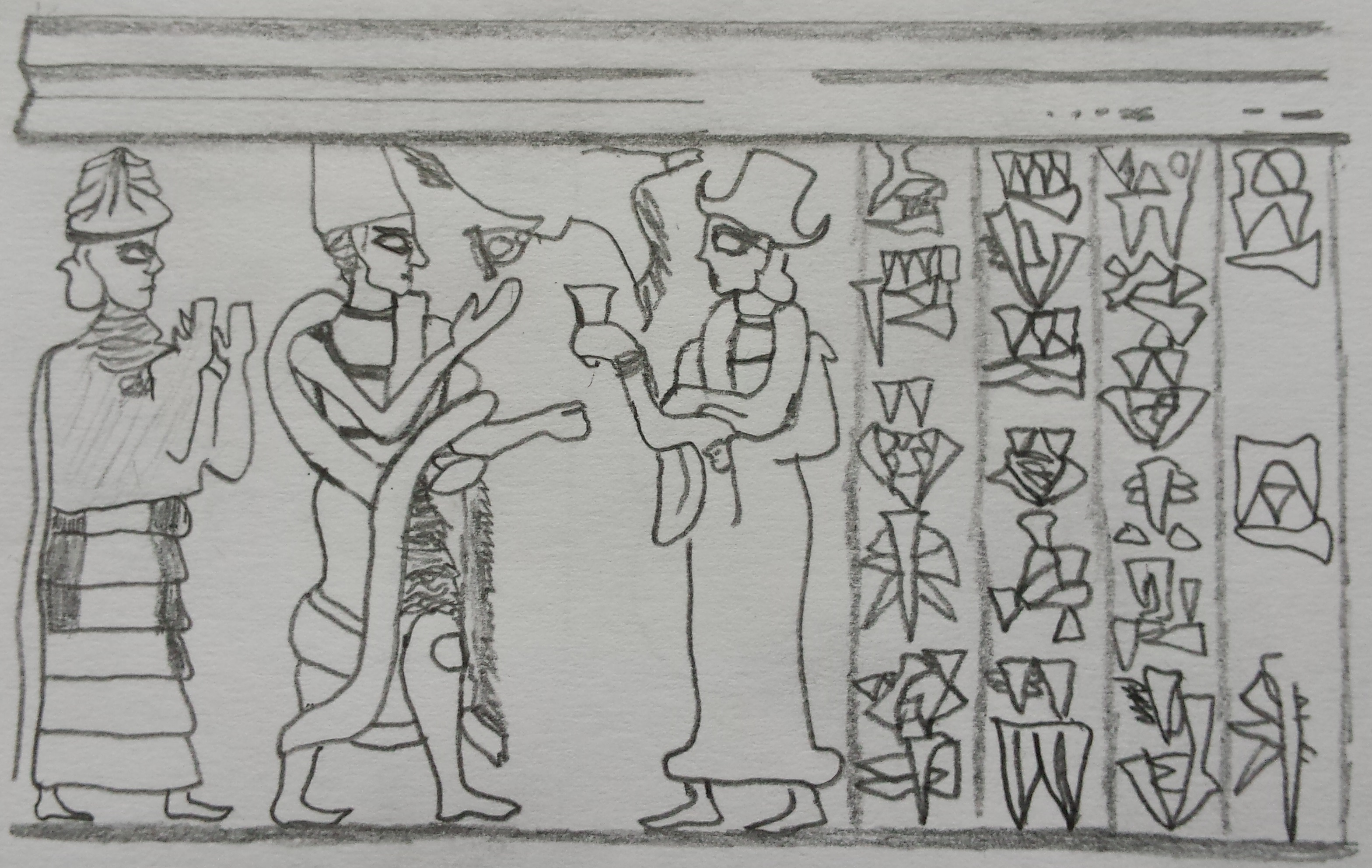

King of Yamhad
- Reign: c. 1750 - c. 1720 BC
- Predecessor: Hammurabi I
- Successor: Yarim-Lim II
- Died: c. 1720 BC
- Father: Hammurabi I

Abba-El I (Abba-ili I, Abban I; died c. 1720 BC) was the fourth great king of Yamhad (Halab), succeeding his father Hammurabi I.

== Reign ==
Hammurabi I left Yamhad a prosperous country, and Abba-El's reign was relatively peaceful. He maintained good commercial relations with Babylon. The main event of his reign was the rebellion of Zitraddu, governor of the city Irridu which belonged along with its district to Abba-El's brother Yarim-Lim.

A tablet discovered at Alalakh explains the circumstances which led to the forming of the kingdom of Alalakh; it revealed that Abba-El I destroyed Irridu and compensated his brother by giving him Alalakh as a hereditary kingdom for his dynasty under the suzerainty of Aleppo but that it should be forfeited if Yarim-Lim or his descendants committed treason against Yamhad.

Abba-El I took an oath upon himself not to confiscate his brother's new kingdom and that he might be cursed if he ever did. In return, Yarim-Lim took an oath of loyalty to his brother, specifying that if he or his descendants ever committed treason or spilled Abba-El I's secrets to another king, their lands would be forfeited.

The Hurrians's influence seems clear during Abba-El's reign, as he recalls the help given to him by the Hurrian Goddess Hebat.

Abba-El died around 1720 BC and was succeeded by Yarim-Lim II, who was probably his son; however, Moshe Weinfeld believes that Yarim-Lim II was the same as Yarim-Lim of Alalakh. This theory has not found wide support in scholarship.

== Ancestry ==
Ancestors of Abba-El I

Sumu-Epuh
Yarim-Lim I
Sumunna-Abi
Hammurabi I
Gashera
Abba-El I

King Abba-El I of Yamhad (Halab) Yamhad dynasty Died: c. 1720 BC
Regnal titles
Preceded by Hammurabi I	King of Yamhad c. 1750 - c. 1720 BC	Succeeded by Yarim-Lim II
