= Hammurabi I =

King of Yamhad
- Reign: c. 1764 - c. 1750 BC
- Predecessor: Yarim-Lim I
- Successor: Abba-El I
- Died: c. 1750 BC
- Issue: Abba-El I; Yarim-Lim; Nakkusse; Tatteya
- Father: Yarim-Lim I
- Mother: Gashera

Hammurabi I (died c. 1750 BC) is the third attested king of Yamhad (Halab).

== Early life ==
Hammurabi was the son of Yarim-Lim I, and his mother was Queen Gashera. His private secretary as a crown prince was Sin-Abushu and is known from the tablets of Mari. Nothing else is known about him before he ascended the throne following the death of his father around 1764 BC.

== Reign ==
Yarim-Lim I left the kingdom on the height of its power and Hammurabi I was among the strongest kings of his age, with no threats to his power as his father had made alliances with Babylon and Eshnunna and eliminated the danger coming from Qatna.

At the beginning of his reign, Hammurabi I sent troops to aid the Babylonian king Hammurabi against Siwe-Palar-Khuppak of Elam who invaded Babylon. Amut-pi'el II of Qatna tried to form an alliance with the Elamite king, but Zimri-Lim of Mari warned Hammurabi I and the Elamite envoys were captured on the borders as they were trying to return to Elam. After defeating Elam, Hammurabi I sent Hammurabi of Babylon troops to aid him against Larsa. The kingdom of Yamhad was of the same status as Babylon, evidenced by Hammurabi of Babylon's treatment of Yamhad's envoys which caused the delegates of Mari to complain. The fact that Zimri-Lim became king with the help of Yamhad meant that Mari was a semi-client state of Yamhad, and in the correspondence between Zimri-Lim and Hammurabi's father Yarim-Lim I, the king of Mari calls Yarim-Lim his father. This situation helped Yamhad's trade because of Mari's location between Babylon and Aleppo. On one occasion, Hammurabi sent an army of 10,000 troops to aid Zimri-Lim. Yamhad's lordship over Mari was so strong that the king of Ugarit asked Hammurabi I to intermediate with Zimri-Lim to let him visit the famous Palace of Mari.

The political - military alliance with Babylon ended with Hammurabi of Babylon invading Mari and destroying the kingdom around 1761 BC, however, economical relations continued as Babylon did not advance into Aleppo territory. The invasion of Mari had a negative impact on trade between the two kingdoms, as the road became dangerous because of the loss of Mari's protection to the caravans crossing that road. Later in Hammurabi I's reign, the city of Carchemish came under Yamhad's domination.

== Death and succession ==
Hammurabi I gave his son Yarim-Lim the city of Irridu. He died around 1750 BC and was succeeded by his son Abba-El I. Another son called Nakkusse appears in the Tablets of Alalakh, holding a high position in its court.

== Ancestry ==
Ancestors of Hammurabi I

Sumu-Epuh
Yarim-Lim I
Sumunna-Abi
Hammurabi I
Gashera

King Hammurabi I of Yamhad (Halab) Yamhad dynasty
Regnal titles
Preceded by Yarim-Lim I	King of Yamhad c. 1764 - c. 1750 BC	Succeeded by Abba-El I
