= Urshu =

City-state in southern Turkey

Urshu (Uršu, Warsuwa or Urshum) was a Hurrian-Amorite city-state in southern Turkey, probably located on the west bank of the Euphrates, and north of Carchemish. The site of Kazane Höyük has been suggest as the location.

== History ==
According to Archi (2011), Uršum (Uršaum) lay north of Hassum (Hassuwan/Haššum), and now has been "placed between Gaziantep and Birecik on the Euphrates, or at Gaziantep itself."

=== Early Bronze Age ===
Urshu was a commercial city governed by a Lord (EN). It was an ally of Ebla and appears in the tablets as Ursa'um. Later it was mentioned in the inscriptions of Gudea (r. c.2144–2124 BC according to the Middle chronology) as the city where wood resins were procured.

=== Middle Bronze Age ===
==== Assyrian Trade Network ====
An old Assyrian letter that dates to the 19th century BC mentions a temple of the god Ashur in Urshu.

==== Middle Bronze II ====
In the beginning of the 18th century BC, Urshu allied with Yamhad against Yahdun-Lim of Mari. Relations with the Kingdom of Upper Mesopotama were also strained, and men of Urshu were summoned by Yapah-Adad and his Habiru to attack the lands of Shamshi-Adad I of the Kingdom of Upper Mesopotamia. The texts of Mari mentions a conflict between Urshu and Carchemish: the tribes of Upra-peans and Ra-beans attacked Urshu through the land of Carchemish, which caused Urshu to attack a contingent of Carchemishean troops and civilians that advanced along the bank of the Euphrates.

Later, Urshu became an economic rival to Yamhad and entered an alliance with Qatna and Shamshi-Adad I to attack Sumu-Epuh of Yamhad (r. c.1810-1780 BC). The death of Shamshi-Adad and the rise of Yarim-Lim I of Yamhad brought an end to this rivalry, as Yamhad was elevated into a Great Kingdom and imposed its direct authority over northern, western and eastern Syria, bringing Urshu under its sphere of influence without annexing it. The Tablets of Mari mention a few kings of Urshu who date to this era, including Shennam and Atru-Sipti, who visited Mari in the 12th year of its king Zimri-Lim.

==== Hittite conquest ====
They broke the battering ram. The king was angry and his face was grim "They constantly bring me bad news, may the storm-god carry you away in a flood!.. but not idle! Make a battering-ram in the Hurrian manner and let it be brought into place. Hew a great battering-ram from the mountains of Hassu and let it be brought into place".

— Hattusili I describing the difficulties during the siege of Urshu.

The Hittite king Hattusili I attacked Urshu in his second year, laying siege to the city for six months. The text Siege of Urshu (CTH 7) was found at Hattusa. The Hittite king had 80 chariots and conducted his operations from the city of Lawazantiya (located in modern Elbistan district) in the Taurus foothills of eastern Cilicia.

Despite receiving aid from Yamhad and Carchemish, Urshu was burned and destroyed; its lands were plundered and the booty taken to the Hittite capital Hattusa.

=== Late Bronze Age ===
The history of Urshu after the conquest is ambiguous. In the 15th century BC it appears in the Tablets of Alalakh as "Uris" or "Uressi".

==== Kizzuwatna period ====
The Treaty of Hittite Tudhaliya I and Sunassura of Kizzuwatna (CTH 41) mentions "Urussa" as part of Kizzuwatna. The city again became part of the Hittite empire and was last mentioned in records dated to the final periods of that empire.

== See also ==
- Hurrians
- Yamhad
- History of the Hittites
