= Yarim-Lim of Alalakh =

Yarim-Lim
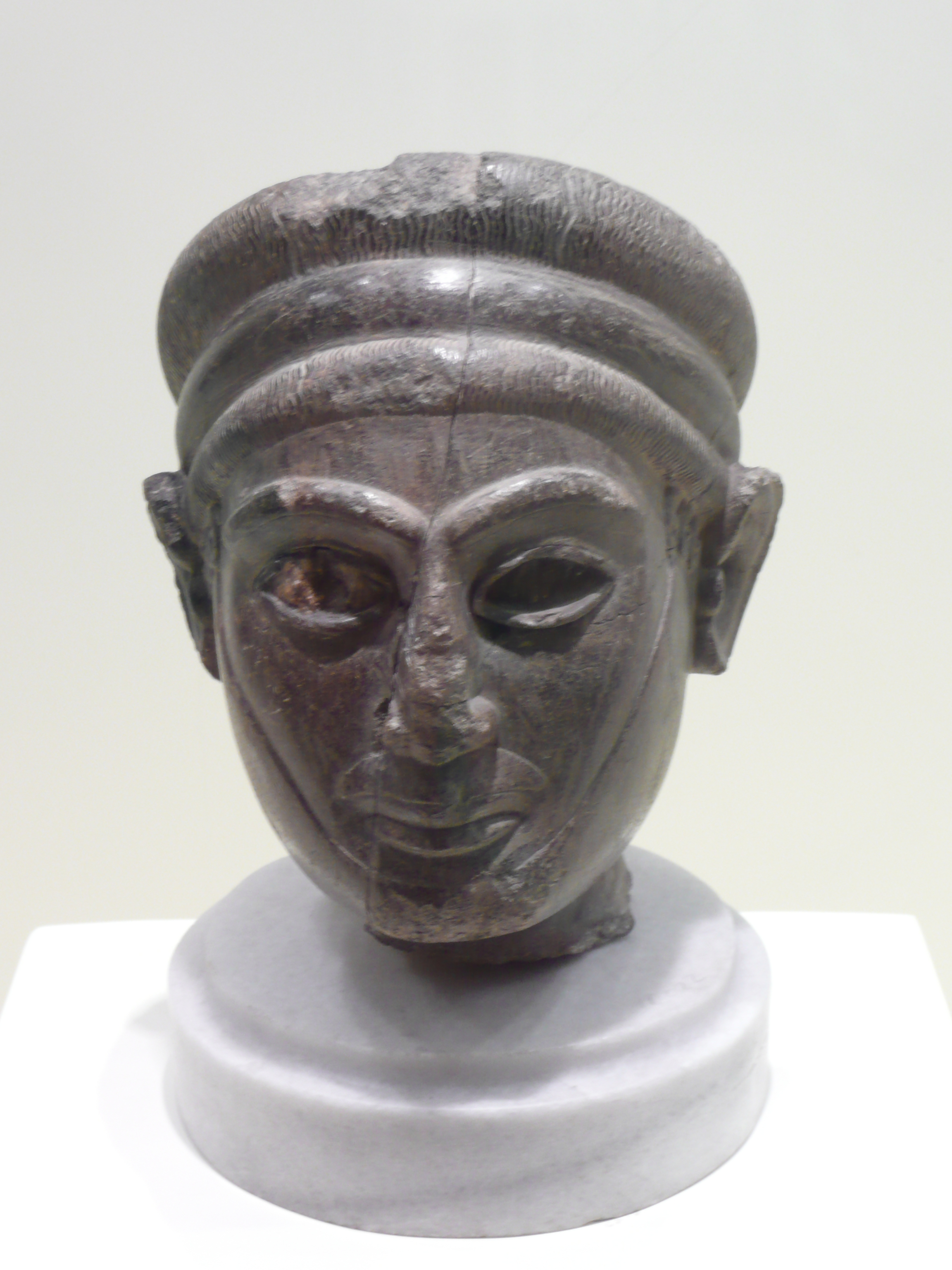

King of Alalakh
- Reign: c. 1735 - c. 1700 BC
- Successor: Ammitakum
- Died: c. 1700 BC
- Issue: Ammitakum
- Father: Hammurabi I

Yarim-Lim (died c. 1700 BC) was a king of Alalakh and son of Hammurabi I of Yamhad. He was granted the city of Alalakh by his brother Abba-El I of Yamhad and started a cadet branch of the Yamhadite dynasty that lasted until the conquest of Alalakh by the Hittite king Hattusili I.

== Identity ==
The identity of Yarim-Lim is under dispute. Yarim-Lim II of Yamhad was the son and successor of Abba-El I, as his seal inscription mentions, and Yarim-Lim of Alalakh mentions that he is the son of Hammurabi I, therefore Yarim-Lim II's uncle. Moshe Weinfeld suggests that Yarim-Lim II of Yamhad and Yarim-Lim of Alalakh were the same individual, who would have been the natural son of Hammurabi I and subsequently adopted by his brother Abba-El I. This theory has not found wide support in scholarship.

== Life and Reign ==
Hammurabi I appointed Yarim-Lim as the governor of a district in the north with Irridu was the main city. Under his older brother, Abba-El I of Yamhad, Yarim-Lim continued to rule the district. Zitraddu, governor of Irridu, rebelled against Yamhad which caused Abba-El I to destroy the city. As compensation, Abba-El signed a treaty with his brother that gave Yarim-Lim the city of Alalakh as a hereditary kingdom under the suzerainty of Aleppo. This happened 15 years after the beginning of Abba-El I's reign, which would put it around 1735 BC.

Yarim-Lim swore an oath of loyalty to his brother which included that if he or his descendants ever committed treason or revealed Abba-El's secrets to another king, their lands would be forfeited.[7]

Yarim-Lim ruled through the rest of his brother's reign and continued to rule during the reign of his nephew Yarim-Lim II of Yamhad and the first few years of his grand nephew Niqmi-Epuh's reign which lasted from c. 1700 BC to c. 1675 BC. Yarim-Lim was succeeded by his son Ammitakum.

=== Yarim-Lim II of Alalakh ===
Nadav Na'aman proposes that Yarim-Lim, son of Hammurabi I was not the only king of Alalakh with that name and that there was a second Yarim-Lim, Yarim-Lim II who ruled Alalakh and was a grandchild of the first. Na'aman bases his theory on the exceptionally long reigns of Yarim-Lim and his successor Ammitakum which span the reigns of five Yamhadite kings. The number of the Kings of Alalakh is a highly debated subject, and Na'aman's theory is supported by several other scholars, such as Dominique Collon and Erno Gaál. However no evidence has been found to prove the existence of a second Yarim-Lim and several other scholars have rejected this theory, including Horst Klengel and Marlies Heinz.

== Burial and statue ==
Sir. Leonard Woolley discovered the Palace of Yarim-Lim during the excavations that started in 1936; the burial chamber consisted of a pit 15 meters deep, and in the center of the pit was a shaft nine meters deep that has the funeral urn inside. The shaft was filled with stones and then the pit was filled by successive layers of ceremonial buildings, each building burned and then topped by another layer. Above the pit a royal chapel was built which contained a diorite Statue of Yarim-Lim.

Woolley mistakenly assumed that Yarim-Lim statue represented Yarim-Lim I of Yamhad. The reading of Alalakh tablet gave a better understanding of that period and revealed that the statue represents Yarim-Lim of Alalakh who was a grandchild of Yarim-Lim I of Yamhad.

== Ancestry ==
Ancestors of Yarim-Lim of Alalakh

Sumu-Epuh
Yarim-Lim I
Sumunna-Abi
Hammurabi I
Gashera
Yarim-Lim

King Yarim-Lim of Alalakh Yamhad dynasty
Regnal titles
Preceded by	King of Yamhad c. 1735 - c. 1700 BC	Succeeded by Ammitakum
