= Ishi-Addu =

King of Qatna
- Reign: c. 1783 – c. 1772 BC
- Predecessor: Amut-pi'el I
- Successor: Amut-pi'el II
- Died: c. 1772 BC
- Issue: Amut-pi'el II; Dam-Hurasi

Ishi-Addu or Išḫi-Addu (died c. 1772 BC) was king of Qatna in the first half of the 18th century BC during the early Middle Bronze IIA (c. 1820-1630 BC).

He is known for his correspondences with Shamshi-Adad I of the Kingdom of Upper Mesopotamia who was his closest ally. Qatna was at its height during Ishi-Addu's reign, which was, however, plagued with revolts in the southern parts of the kingdom and with constant war with Yamhad, Qatna's northern neighbour.

== Reign ==
When his reign began is uncertain; he succeeded Amut-pi'el I, who is most likely his father. Ishi-Addu is mainly known from his correspondences with Mari for a period of six years between c. 1783–1778 BC.

Qatna was at its apex during the reign of Ishi-Addu. In the South, he was the overlord of Hazor. In the west, he influenced the many kingdoms of Amurru which controlled the central Levantine coast between Byblos and Ugarit acknowledged his authority. Ishi-Addu was a close ally of Shamshi-Adad I of the Kingdom of Upper Mesopotamia who conquered Mari and installed his son Yasmah-Adad on its throne. The alliance between Qatna and Assyria was concluded shortly after Yasmah-Adad installation; it was cemented by the marriage of Dam-Ḫuraṣi, Ishi-Addu's daughter, to Yasmah-Adad around 1782 BC. (Note: In Mari, Dam-Ḫuraṣi was called "Beltum", an epithet that means mistress or the first lady of the palace. Dam-Ḫuraṣi was actually the name of Zimri-Lim's wife, Yasmah-Adad's successor, while the latter's wife was only mentioned as Beltum in Mari, but her identification as Dam-Ḫuraṣi have an academic consensus. Some scholars, however, such as Jack M. Sasson, argue against such an identification and separate the two queens.) The dowry of Qatna's princess was huge and Ishi-Addu demanded his vassals to contribute; a tablet discovered in Hazor contains orders from Qatna for the providing of large quantities of commodities such as textiles, objects made of precious metals and weapons. (Note: The tablet is damaged and the sender's name is missing. Dominique Charpin and Nele Ziegler identified the sender as Shamshi-Adad I, while Wayne Horowitz and Nathan Wasserman presented several arguments for identifying the origin of the tablet with Qatna; for example, the word "duhšûm" in the tablet was written "DU_{8}.Šl.A", a lemma that is used in Qatna while in Mari the word would be written as "DU_{8}.ŠÚA".)

Since early in their history, Qatna and Yamhad shared a hostile relation; the situation worsened during Ishi-Addu's reign and evolved into border warfare. Qatna occupied the city of Parga in the region of Hamath for a while before Sumu-Epuh of Yamhad retook it. In the south, Ishi-Addu faced a general rebellion; after petitions by Qatna, Shamshi-Adad I sent an army to help Ishi-Addu dealing with the rebellion. Shamshi-Adad I planned to send an army of 20,000 soldiers and for his son Yasmah-Adad to lend them leadership, but these plans could not be realized. Instead, a much more modest army was sent under command from generals who were put in the service of Ishi-Addu around 1781 BC. The Assyrian troops avoided engaging Yamhad and did not participate in its war with Qatna while Ishi-Addu took up residence in Qadeš to oversee the suppression of the rebellion, which apparently was supported by Yamhad. A fortress near Lake Homs was named after the king "Dur-Ishi-Addu".

The archive of Mari contains many letters from Ishi-Addu to Shamshi-Adad and his sons; in one of them, the king of Qatna tried to persuade Yasmah-Adad to join him in conquering three cities, telling his son in law that a big booty awaits them. There was also an incident where Yasmah-Adad detained messengers from Qatna causing Shamshi-Adad to write a sharp letter to his son ordering him to release the messengers. After four years in the service of Qatna, Shamshi-Adad I ordered his troops back and it might be connected to a peace treaty between Assyria and Yarim-Lim I, son of Sumu-Epuh; Ishi-Addu, who in the past declared that "even if Shamshi-Adad would conclude peace with Sumu-epuh, I will never make peace with Sumu-epuh, as long as I live!", was delivered a heavy blow. The sources of Mari are silent on how the king dealt with the situation that resulted from Shamshi-Adad's peace with Yamhad, and by the time they resumed mentioning Qatna around 1772 BC, Ishi-Addu was dead and succeeded by his son Amut-pi'el II.

== Personality ==
Judging by his letters, the king had a great ability to whine whenever he felt insulted. Shortly after Shamshi-Adad I's death, tension between Ishi-Addu and the Assyrian king's eldest son Ishme-Dagan I occurred. The king of Assyria asked for two horses from Qatna, and it seems that Ishi-Addu asked for something in return, but Ishme-Dagan sent a small amount of the horses' real value and seems to not have met Ishi-Addu's request causing the latter to write an angry message, (Note: Išḫi-Addu wrote to Ishme-Dagan: "Speak to Ishme-Dagan, says Išḫi-Addu, your brother. This is a matter about which one does not really speak, but in fact I must talk about it and make my heart easier. You behave as a sovereign king. You asked me two white horses that you wanted, and I sent them to you. However, there were 20 minas of tin that you sent to me. Without any formal agreement with me, you have not gone wanting. But you gave me a little tin. If only you could have brought me nothing!, by the name of the god of my father, my heart would not have been darkened. The price of these two horses is 600 shekels of silver in Qatna, that is their value and you sent me 20 minas of tin! Who hears this, what will he say? Will not he mock us? This house is your house! What is missing in your house that a brother does not give his brother what he needs? If you had not sent me any tin at all, my heart would not have been darkened. You are not a great king! why did you do this? This house is your house!.) which was apparently intercepted in Mari by Yasmah-Adad who had interest in keeping his brother and father in law at peace. His letters concerning his daughter also reveal a man capable of compassion; he wrote Yasmah-Adad: "I am placing in your lap my flesh and my future. Your maid I have given you, may God prove her attractive to you. I am placing in your lap my flesh and my future, for this throne ('house') has now become yours and Mari's has now become mine".
