= Tel Hazor =

Archeological site of an ancient city in Israel

- תל חצור (Hebrew)
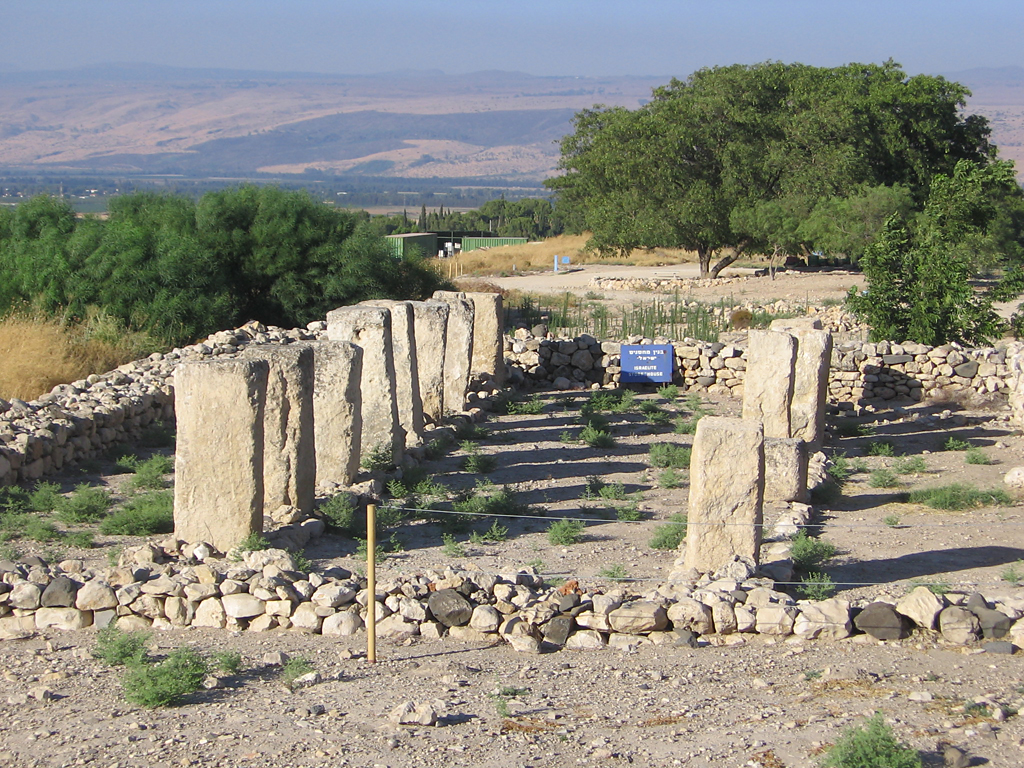
- House of Pillars at Hazor

- Location within Northeast Israel Location within Israel Location within West and Central Asia
- 33°1′0″N 35°34′1″E
- Type: Settlement
- Location: Tell el-Qedah, Israel
- Region: Upper Galilee

History
- Abandoned: 732 BC

UNESCO World Heritage Site
- Official name: Biblical Tells – Megiddo, Hazor, Beer Sheba
- Type: Cultural
- Criteria: ii, iii, iv, vi
- Designated: 2005 (29th session)
- Reference no.: 1108
- Region: Asia-Pacific

Tel Hazor (Hebrew: תל חצור, romanized: Tel Ḥāṣor), translated in LXX as Hasōr (Ancient Greek: Άσώρ), and in Arabic Tell Waqqas or Tell Qedah el-Gul (Arabic: تل القدح, romanized: Tell el-Qedah), is an archaeological tell at the site of ancient Hazor, located in the Upper Galilee, north of the Sea of Galilee, in the northern Korazim Plateau. From the Middle Bronze Age (around 1750 BCE) to the Iron Age (ninth century BCE), Hazor was the largest fortified city in the region and one of the most important in the Fertile Crescent. It maintained commercial ties with Babylon and Syria, and imported large quantities of tin for the bronze industry. In the Book of Joshua, Hazor is described as "the head of all those kingdoms" (Josh. 11:10) and archaeological excavations have emphasized the city's importance.

The Hazor expedition, headed by Yigael Yadin in the mid-1950s, was the most important dig undertaken by Israel in its early years of statehood. Tel Hazor is the largest archaeological site in northern Israel, featuring an upper tell of 12 hectares (30 acres) and a lower city of more than 70 hectares (175 acres).

In 2005, the remains of Hazor were designated a World Heritage Site as part of the Biblical Tels—Megiddo, Hazor, Beer Sheba.

== Excavations ==
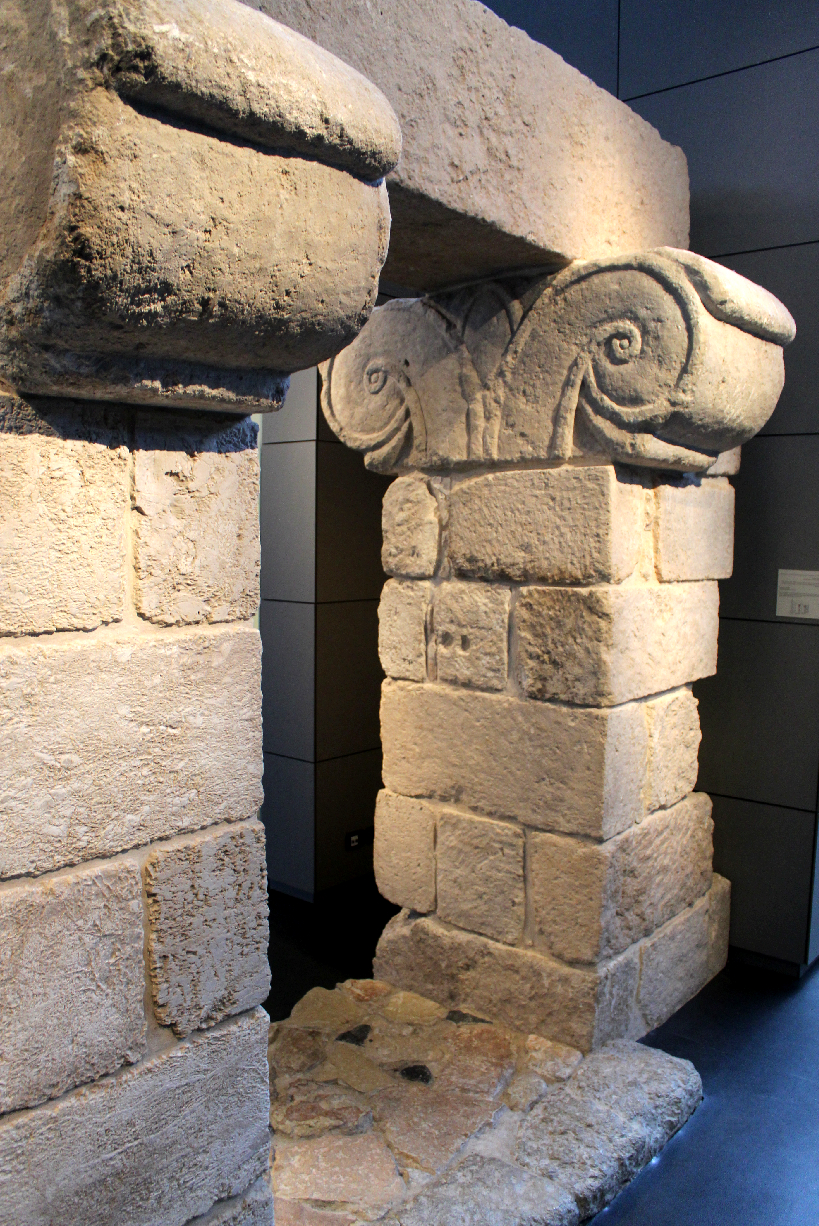
Royal fortress gate found at Hazor, now in the Israel Museum

The site of Hazor is around 80 hectares (200 acres) in area, with an upper city making up about one eighth of that. The upper mound has a height of about 40 meters. Initial soundings were carried out by John Garstang in 1926.

Major excavations were conducted for four seasons from 1955 to 1958 by a Hebrew University team led by Yigael Yadin. Yadin returned to Hazor for a final season of excavation in 1968. The excavations were supported by James A. de Rothschild, and were published in a dedicated five volume set of books by the Israel Exploration Society.

Excavation at the site by Hebrew University, joined by the Complutense University of Madrid, resumed in 1990 under Amnon Ben-Tor. Those excavations continue to the present. The work from 1990 to 2012 is detailed in two IEF books.

In the 2010 excavation season, two cuneiform fragments from the same tablet, made of local clay, were discovered dating to the Old Babylonian period of the Middle Bronze Age. The 2nd fragment is small, containing only 7 signs. They are inscribed with laws in the style of Hammurabi's Code, the Laws of Eshnunna, and Hittite laws, seven in total. The fragments include laws pertaining to body parts and damages including those of slaves.

Late Bronze Age era monumental structures in the acropolis of Hazor combine palatial and religious functions, a practice hitherto undocumented in northern Canaan. A "Ceremonial Palace" with a large throne room dubbed the "Black Building" exhibits a Syrian architectural tradition, with parallels found in the Royal Palace of Ugarit in Ras-Shamra. To its immediate east, separated by a central courtyard lies the "White Building", with a significantly different architectural plan, more aligned with the Levantine long-room temple type. To the immediate north of the "Ceremonial Palace" complex, at the top of the acropolis, lies yet another Levantine long-room temple type, with similarities to one mapped at Tell Kazell on the banks of the Syrian Euphrates.

The 2013 excavation season involved the Late Bronze Age (LBA) area M-East, and M-West. M-East included small elements of MBA and represented a major destruction event with extensive burning. In the 2014 and 2015 seasons the Iron Age II thru 8th century BCE layer of area M3 and the Iron age M4 area were worked. A number of unbaked loom weights were found there. The excavation of 2016 was in the LBA administrative palace destruction layer of area M3. Finds included fragments of an Egyptian statue. The 10 century BCE standing stone complex and 9th century BCE fortifications, built on top of the LBA destruction layer, were also further explored. In 2017 excavation work concentrated in the LBA M3 area containing an administrative palace with a basalt monumental entrance stair. Work also continued on the Iron Age II fortifications. In the 2018 excavation season, the 29th season, from June to July 2018, areas worked were the LBA M3, the 8th century BCE and Persian M4, and the 8th and 10th century BC M68. In the 2019 season, the 13th of the current excavation, areas M4 and M68 were worked, both Iron Age.

In total, Hazor has provided more cuneiform tablets than any other site in the Southern Levant. They fall into two groups. Those from the Middle Bronze period are in standard Old Babylonian Akkadian language while those from the Late Bronze Age are in a local dialect typical of New Kingdom Egyptian times.

Finds from the dig are housed in a museum at Kibbutz Ayelet HaShahar. In 2008, some artifacts in the museum were damaged in an earthquake.

== Chronology ==
This table lists the strata (layers) of ruined settlements that accumulated to form Tel Hazor according to Hazor archeologist Sharon Zuckerman. The shades represent the different archeological periods: Bronze Age, Iron Age, Persian period and Hellenistic period. Some layers are associated with the content of contemporary historical sources.

Fixed date (BCE)	Archeological period	Stratum (layer) – Upper City	Stratum (layer) – Lower City	Excavation results	Historical references
28th century	Early Bronze Age III–II	XXI		Houses	
27th century 24th century	Early Bronze Age III	XX–XIX		Houses and a monumental structure (possibly a palace or other central building)	
22nd century 21st century	Middle Bronze Age I/Intermediate Bronze Age	XVIII		Houses	
18th century	Middle Bronze Age IIA–B	Pre XVII		Burials and structures	Egyptian Execration Texts
18th century 17th century	Middle Bronze Age IIB	XVII	4	Erection of the earthen rampart of the Lower City	Mari archive
17th century 16th century	Middle Bronze Age IIB	XVI	3	Both Upper and Lower Cities are settled.	
15th century	Late Bronze Age I	XV	2	Both Upper and Lower Cities are settled.	Annals of Thutmose III
14th century	Late Bronze Age II	XIV	1b	Both Upper and Lower Cities are settled.	Amarna letters
13th century	Late Bronze Age II	XIII	1a	Both Upper and Lower Cities are settled.	Papyrus Anastasi I
11th century	Iron Age I	XII–XI		pits and meager architecture	
mid 10th century early 9th century	Iron Age IIA	X–IX		six-chambered gate, casemate wall, domestic structures	United Kingdom of Israel (possibly under Solomon)
9th century	Iron Age IIA–B	VIII–VII		casemate wall still used, administrative structures and domestic units	Northern Kingdom of Israel (Omri dynasty)
8th century	Iron Age IIC	VI–V		casemate wall still used, administrative structures and domestic units	Northern Kingdom of Israel (from under Jeroboam II to the Assyrian destruction by Tiglath-Pileser III
8th century	Iron Age IIC	IV		sporadic settlement	post–Assyrian destruction; settlement (possibly Israelite)
7th century	Iron Age IIC (Assyrian)	III		governmental structures on and around the tell	
5th century 4th century	Persian	II		citadel, tombs	
3rd century 1st century	Hellenistic	I		citadel	

In a recent article (2021), Israel Finkelstein, quoting his past articles regarding stratum X in Tel Hazor (shown in the table above), commonly attributed to Solomon, states:

"In past articles I proposed identifying Omride architecture. ... I therefore see no alternative to the Omride identity of Hazor X..."

Finkelstein's Low Chronology is disputed by other archaeologists, such as William G. Dever, who considers that although the "larger-than-life" portrait of the Bible is exaggerated, Judah was a centralized kingdom around 10th century BCE and likely ruled by Solomon. The conventional date of stratum X in the 10th century is also supported by Amnon Ben-Tor and Shlomit Bechar, the chief excavators at the site. A more nuanced position is held by Avraham Faust et al. (2021), who consider the chronological difference between Finkelstein and his opponents was already narrowed when he agreed that "not only the Iron Age IIA, but perhaps even the late Iron Age IIA, started already in the 10th century", but that most scholars have instead adopted various versions of the traditional, or modified, chronology.

Among scholars who support Finkelstein's Low chronology, regarding Tel Hazor's stratum X, is Merja Alanne, which in her (2017) Doctoral dissertation, quoting late Dr. Orna Zimhoni's work (1997), writes:

"Unlike Zarzegi-Peleg, Zimhoni leans towards the lower chronology and dates Megiddo VA-IVB to the 9th century, following the date of the pottery from the Jezreel enclosure. Accordingly, Hazor X−IX would also be dated to the same century."

However, other scholars such as Thomas E. Levy and Daniel Frese have noted that the evidence of the pottery from Jezreel is insufficient to support the Low chronology:

"A more serious objection, made by many researchers, is that the pottery of the Iron Age IIA is basically the same for much of the 10th and 9th centuries (Ben-Tor and Ben-Ami 1998: 30; Halpern 2000: 102; Mazar and Carmi 2001: 1340; Mazar 2005: 19; Dever 2005: 75-76; Mazar 2007: 147-48). Thus, the Jezreel compound and Megiddo VA-IVB might have the same pottery, but that does not mean they both represent the 9th century."

== History ==
=== Early Bronze Age ===
The first settlement excavated in Tel Hazor is dated to the Early Bronze Age II and III periods, existing at around the 28th and 24th centuries BCE. It was part of a system of settlements around the Hula Valley, including Abel Beth Maachah, Dan and Kedesh. The settlement was exposed in limited areas where a few houses were discovered. Based on these finds, Early Bronze Age Hazor was not a significant settlement. With that said, it seems that a large monumental structure dated to the following Middle Bronze Age period was already erected in the Early Bronze Age, sometime after the 27th century BCE. If this is true it implies that already in its beginnings, Hazor was a well-planned settlement that served as an urban center. It also shows one of the earliest examples of basalt slabs used as foundations to walls (orthostates) in the Southern Levant, only preceded by a temple from Tel Megiddo. The transition to the Early Bronze Age III period is characterized by the movement of people from rural areas within the valley to major urban sites such as Hazor, Dan and Abel Beth Maachah. Thus the establishment of a possible palace in Hazor, as well as in Dan, attest to this phenomenon.

A large part of Hazor's pottery from that time belongs to the Khirbet Kerak type. A petrographic study of these vessels has shown that they were made with local clays and that Hazor played a key role in distributing them across the country. The study also showed that other types of pottery were made of a different source of local clay. This use of two different local clays for two different families of vessels might indicate a technical decision or otherwise the presence of two or more workshops. One theory suggests that the manufacturers of the Khirbet Kerak tools, which were introduced to the settlement, chose or were forced to use a different source of clay, not controlled by the other workshops. Noteworthy is the discovery of 15 cylinder seal impressions on pottery from this period, added to another found some 2 kilometers south. This assemblage is one of the largest in the southern Levant and the fact it was found in such a small excavation area further supports the reconstruction of Hazor as an important city during this period.

=== Intermediate Bronze Age ===
Compared to the rest of Canaan, Hazor and Megiddo did not show signs of urban decline in the Intermediate Bronze Age. In Hazor, there was evidence of human settlements and a thriving economy, based on copper ingots and pottery from the Megiddo Ware family.

In 2021, archaeologists discovered that Intermediate Bronze Age (ca. 2300–2200 BC) Hazor was preceded by years of abandonment, which started in the Early Bronze Age III (ca. 2500 BC). The latter was left in ruins but the new city built on top followed similar architectural patterns.

=== Middle Bronze Age ===
==== Middle Bronze I ====
In Middle Bronze IB (c. 1910-1820 BCE), Hazor saw urbanization return to the Hula Valley and construction of the palace started.

==== Middle Bronze II ====
During the Middle Bronze II (1820–1550 BC), Hazor was a vassal of Ishi-Addu of Qatna and his son Amutpiel II. Qatna was at the time a rival of the Great Kingdom of Yamhad centered on Aleppo, which also included Ebla and Hamath. Qatna controlled territory towards the Akkar Plain and the Beqa Valley to Hazor. However, Qatna also faced rebellions in the south, often instigated by Yamhad. In any case, Hazor was under strong Syrian influence from the north.

King Ibni-Addu of Hazor (c. 1770–1765 BC) is known through a letter fragment addressed to him.. There are trade routes connecting Hazor with Zimri-Lim of Mari and Yarim-Lim of Yamhad. Tin trade was important used together with copper to make the alloy bronze. For a brief time, Mari received tin from Elam before their friendship collapsed. ARMT 23 556 (dating to year 9–10 of Zimri-Lim) mentions this tin trade and Ibni-Addu of Hazor.

==== Execration texts ====
Hazor is mentioned in Egyptian execration texts dating from the mid-12th and early 13th dynasties.

==== Mari Archive ====
At Mari (Syria), on the Euphrates River, letters mention Hazor during the reigns of Yasmah-Adad and Zimri-Lim (1775–1761 BC). Hazor is part of a trade route Hazor-Qatna-Mari. A tablet fragment was also found at Hazor which listed an expected trade path from Hazor to Mari and then on to Ekallatum. The Mari Letter (IAA 1997-3305) is a list of commodities from Mari to Hazor. Some 15 documents mentions Hazor, its king and inhabitants.

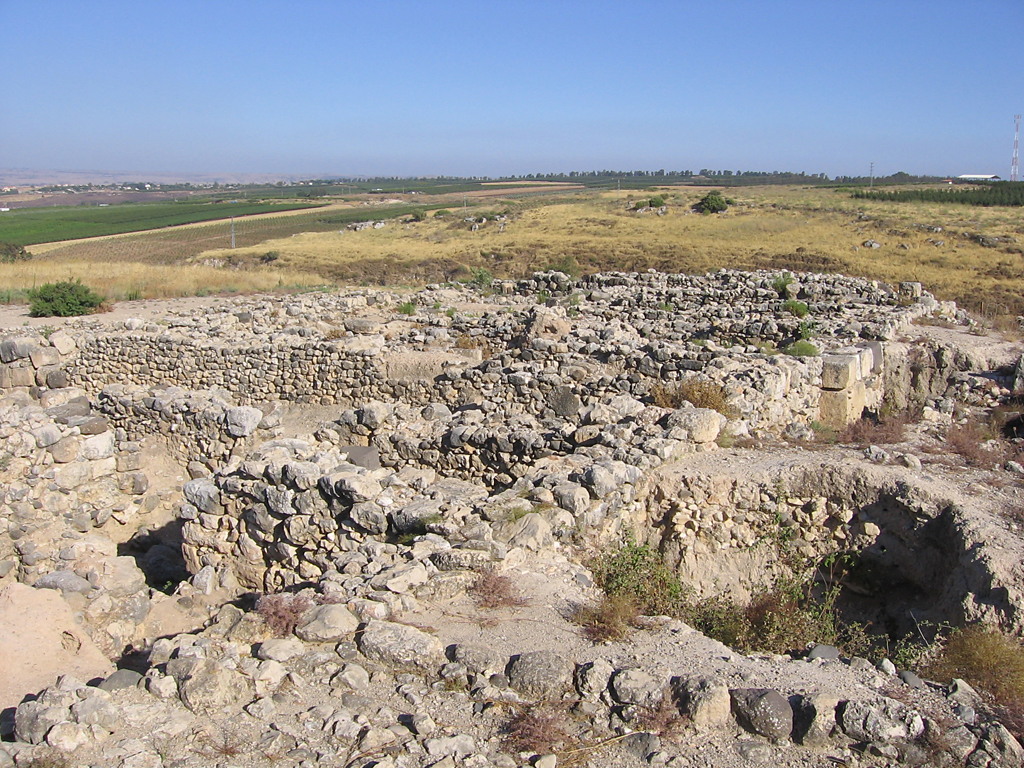
Archaeological remains at Hazor

=== Late Bronze Age ===
==== Egyptian period ====
F18 Y1 U28 G1 D21 Z1 N25
ḥwḏꜣr
in hieroglyphs
Era: New Kingdom
(1550–1069 BC)

At the beginning of the early New Kingdom, Ahmose I started military campaigns into the southern Levant to evict the Hyksos. Several cities were attacked and more military campaigns came with Thutmose I and later Thutmose III.

Under Thutmose III Canaan was an Egyptian vassal state.

In the Amarna Period (c. 1350 BCE), the Man of Hazor (LU_{2} Hasura) saw its petty king Abdi-Tirshi swearing loyalty to the Egyptian pharaoh. In Amarna Tablet EA 148, Abi-Milku, the king of Tyre, accused to pharaoh that the land of Hazor is taken by Habiru and the king of Hazor aligned with Habiru, and in EA 228, the king of Hazor requests the pharaoh to remember the harm that is done (by Habiru/ʿApiru or neighboring cities) against his city.

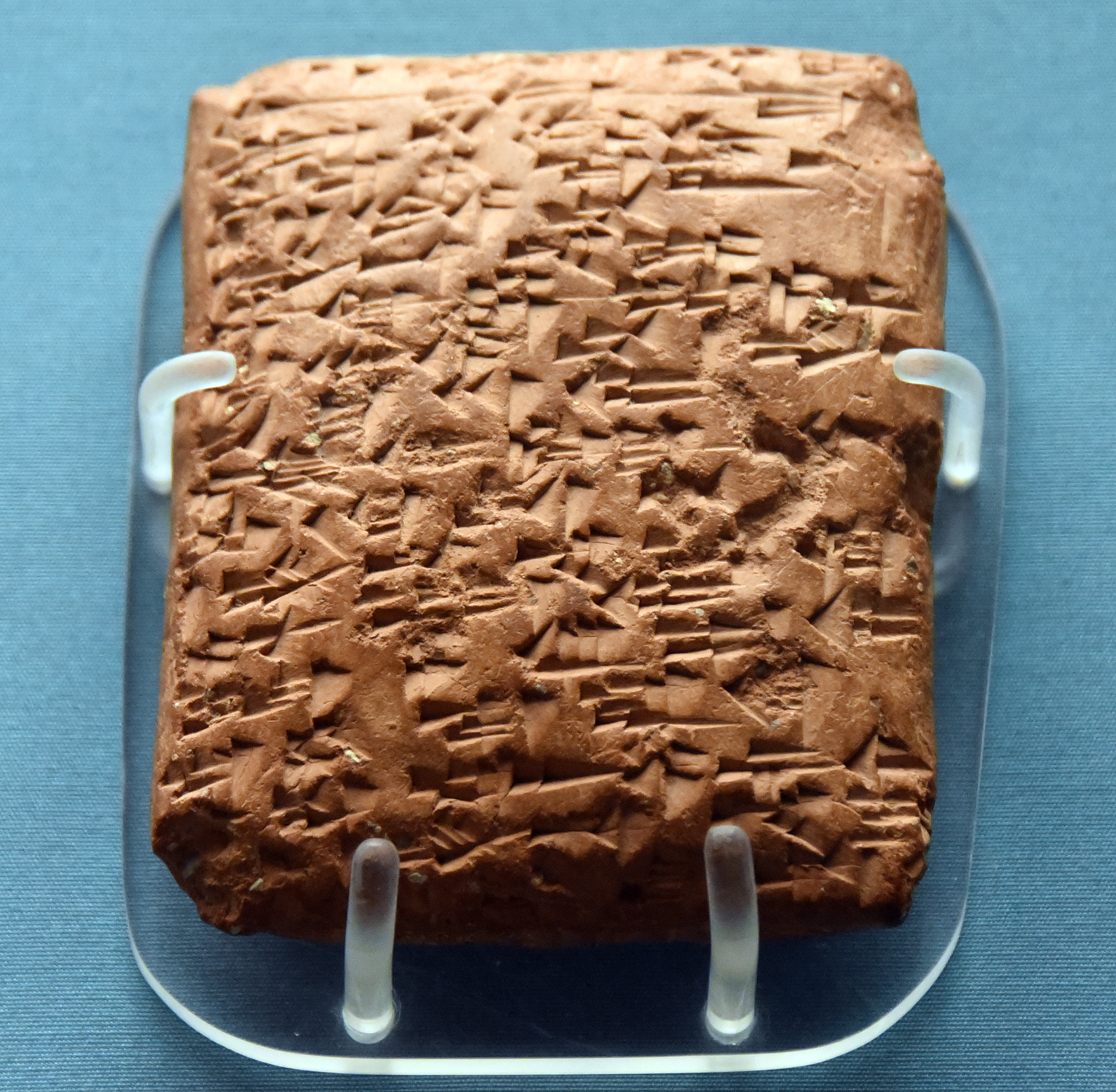
Amarna letter. A letter from Abdi-Tirshi (King of Hazor) to the Egyptian Pharaoh Amenhotep III or his son Akhenaten. 14th century BCE. From Tell el-Amarna, Egypt. The British Museum

==== Biblical archaelogy ====
According to the Book of Joshua, Hazor was the seat of Jabin, a powerful Canaanite king who led a Canaanite confederation against Joshua, an Israelite military commander. However, Joshua and his soldiers defeated the Canaanites and burnt Hazor to the ground. According to the Book of Judges, Hazor was the seat of Jabin, the king of Canaan, whose commander, Sisera, led a Canaanite army against Barak, but was ultimately defeated. Textual scholars believe that the prose account of Barak, which differs from the poetic account in the Song of Deborah, is a conflation of accounts of two separate events, one concerning Barak and Sisera like the poetic account, the other concerning Jabin's confederation and defeat.

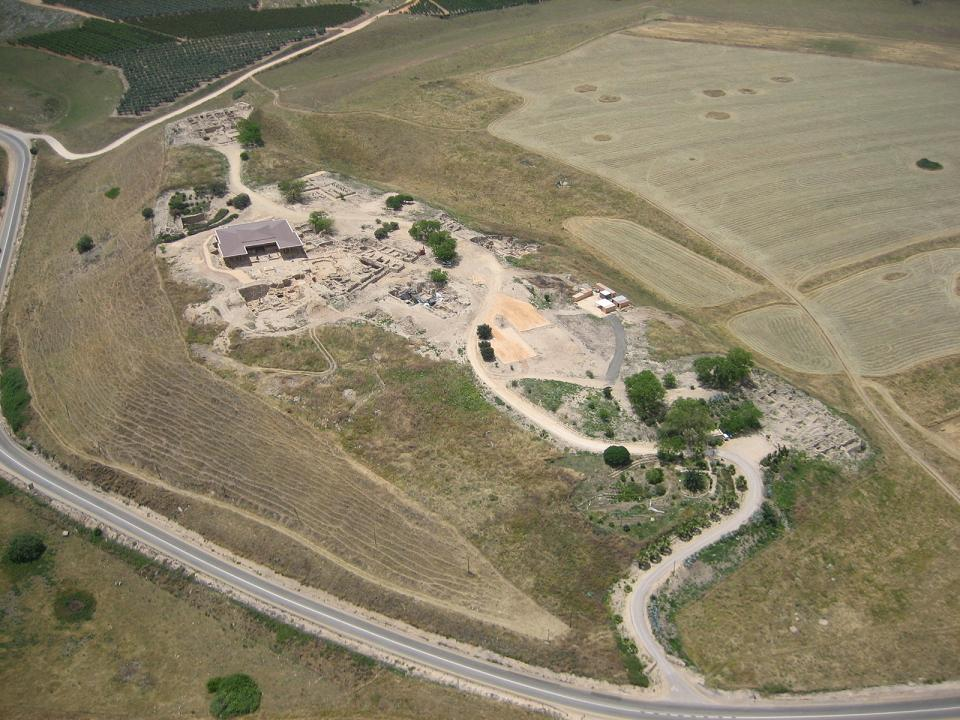
Aerial photo of Tel Hazor. Remains of Iron and Bronze Age cities are seen in the upper tell, and the lower tell stretches to the right and beyond the frame of this photo.

Amnon Ben-Tor of the Hebrew University of Jerusalem believes that recently unearthed evidence of violent destruction by burning verifies the Biblical account. In 2012, a team led Ben-Tor and Sharon Zuckerman discovered a scorched palace from the 13th century BCE in whose storerooms they found ewers holding burned crops; Sharon Zuckerman did not agree with Ben-Tor's theory, and claimed that the burning was the result of the city's numerous factions opposing each other with excessive force. Israel Finkelstein claims that the Israelites emerged as a subculture within Canaanite society and rejects the biblical account of the Israelite conquest of Canaan. In this view, the Book of Joshua conflates several independent battles between disparate groups over the centuries, and artificially attributes them to a single leader, Joshua. One archaeological stratum dating from around 1200 BCE (13th century BCE) shows signs of catastrophic fire, and cuneiform tablets found at the site refer to monarchs named Ibni Addi, where Ibni may be the etymological origin of Yavin (Jabin). The city also show signs of having been a magnificent Canaanite city prior to its destruction, with great temples and opulent palaces, split into an upper acropolis, and lower city; the town evidently had been a major Canaanite city. He theorized that the destruction of Hazor was the result of civil strife, attacks by the Sea Peoples, and/or a result of the general collapse of civilization across the whole Eastern Mediterranean in the Late Bronze Age. More recently, Shlomit Bechar holds that a complex of cultic standing stones (matzebot) from the Iron I and Iron IIa Israelite strata at Hazor was built to commemorate the Israelite conquest of the city. She writes that, whether the Israelites did destroy Hazor or not, this complex shows that the conquest tradition probably emerged at an early date.

Some scholars argue the Book of Judges and Book of Joshua may be parallel accounts referring to the same events, rather than describing different time periods, and thus they may refer to the same Jabin, a powerful king based in Hazor, whose Canaanite confederation was defeated by an Israelite army.

Some Christian polemicists report that the lunar origins of Allah can be found in Hazor, which has been criticized by archaeologists.

=== Iron Age ===
==== Israelite Hazor ====
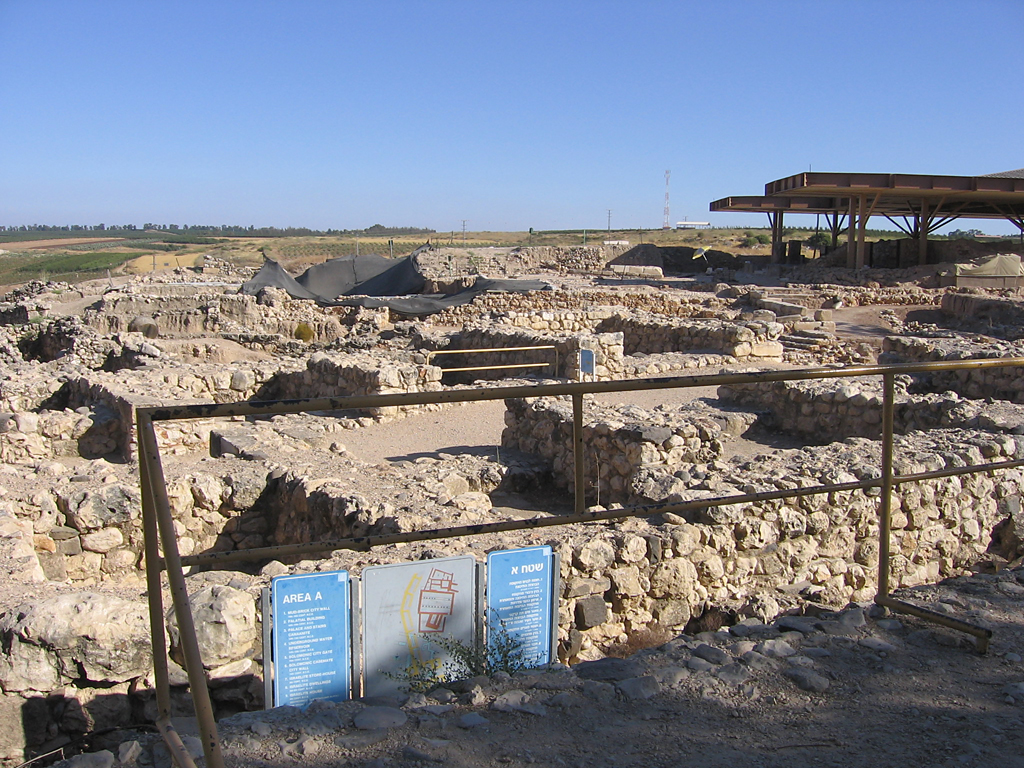
The six-chambered gate from the Israelite period, view from the north-west. Similar gates have also been found at Hazor, Megiddo, and Lachish.

The archaeological remains suggest that after its destruction, the city of Hazor was rebuilt as a minor village within "the territory of Naphtali" (Joshua 19:36). According to the Books of Kings, the town, along with Megiddo, and Gezer, was substantially fortified and expanded by Solomon. Like Megiddo and Gezer, the remains at Hazor show that during the Early Iron Age the town gained a highly distinctive six-chambered gate, as well as a characteristic style to its administration buildings; archaeologists determined that these constructions at Hazor were built by the same leadership as those at Megiddo and Gezer. Many archaeologists conclude that they were constructed in the tenth century by King Solomon; others date these structures to the early 9th century BCE, during the reign of the Omrides.

Yigael Yadin, one of the earliest archaeologists to work on the site, saw certain features as clearly being Omride; Megiddo, Gezer, and Hazor, all feature deep rock cut pits, from the base of which were rock cut tunnels leading to a well that reached the water table, as water-supply systems, which Yadin attributed to the rule of Ahab; Yadin also attributed to Ahab a citadel, measuring 25 × 21 m, with two-meter thick walls, which was erected in the western part of Hazor. It has been claimed that Yadin's dating was based on the assumption that the layer connected with the gates and administration buildings were built by Solomon.

Archaeologist William G. Dever estimates the city's population to have been between 500 and 1,000 people during the 9th and 8th centuries BCE.

Archaeological remains indicate that towards the later half of the 9th century BCE, when the king of Israel was Jehu, Hazor fell into the control of Aram Damascus. Some archaeologists suspect that subsequent to this conquest Hazor was rebuilt by Aram, probably as an Aramaean city. When the Assyrians later defeated the Aramaeans, Hazor seemingly returned to Israelite control; Assyrian records indicate that Joash, king of Israel at the time, had paid tribute to Assyria and Israel had become an Assyrian vassal state. Subsequently, the town, along with the remainder of the kingdom of Israel, entered a period of great prosperity, particularly during the rule of Jeroboam II. Some archaeologists attribute the later large scale constructions at Hazor, Megiddo, and Gezer, including the rock cut water supply systems, to this era.

Israel's attempted rebellion against Assyrian domination resulted in an invasion by the forces of the Assyrian ruler, Tiglath-Pileser III; the evidence on the ground suggests that hasty attempts were made to reinforce the defenses of Hazor. Despite the defences, in 732 BCE Hazor was captured, its population deported, and the city was burnt to the ground.

== See also ==
- Archaeology of Israel
- Cities of the ancient Near East
- Early Israelite campaigns
- Hatzor HaGlilit
- National parks and nature reserves of Israel
- Cuneiform inscriptions found in Israel and Palestine
