= Hammurabi (disambiguation) =

Hammurabi was the sixth king of the First Babylonian Dynasty.

Hammurabi may also refer to:

== Kings ==
- Code of Hammurabi, famous code of law drafted by Hammurabi
- Hammurabi I, the third king of Yamhad, a contemporary to Hammurabi of Babylon
- Hammurabi II, a king of Yamhad
- Hammurabi III, a king of Yamhad
- Hammurabi, a ruler of Kurda

== In computers ==
- Hamurabi (video game), one of the earliest computer games

== Other uses ==
- A division of the Iraqi Republican Guard during the Saddam Hussein era
- 7207 Hammurabi, an asteroid in the Solar System Asteroid belt
