= Niqmi-Epuh =

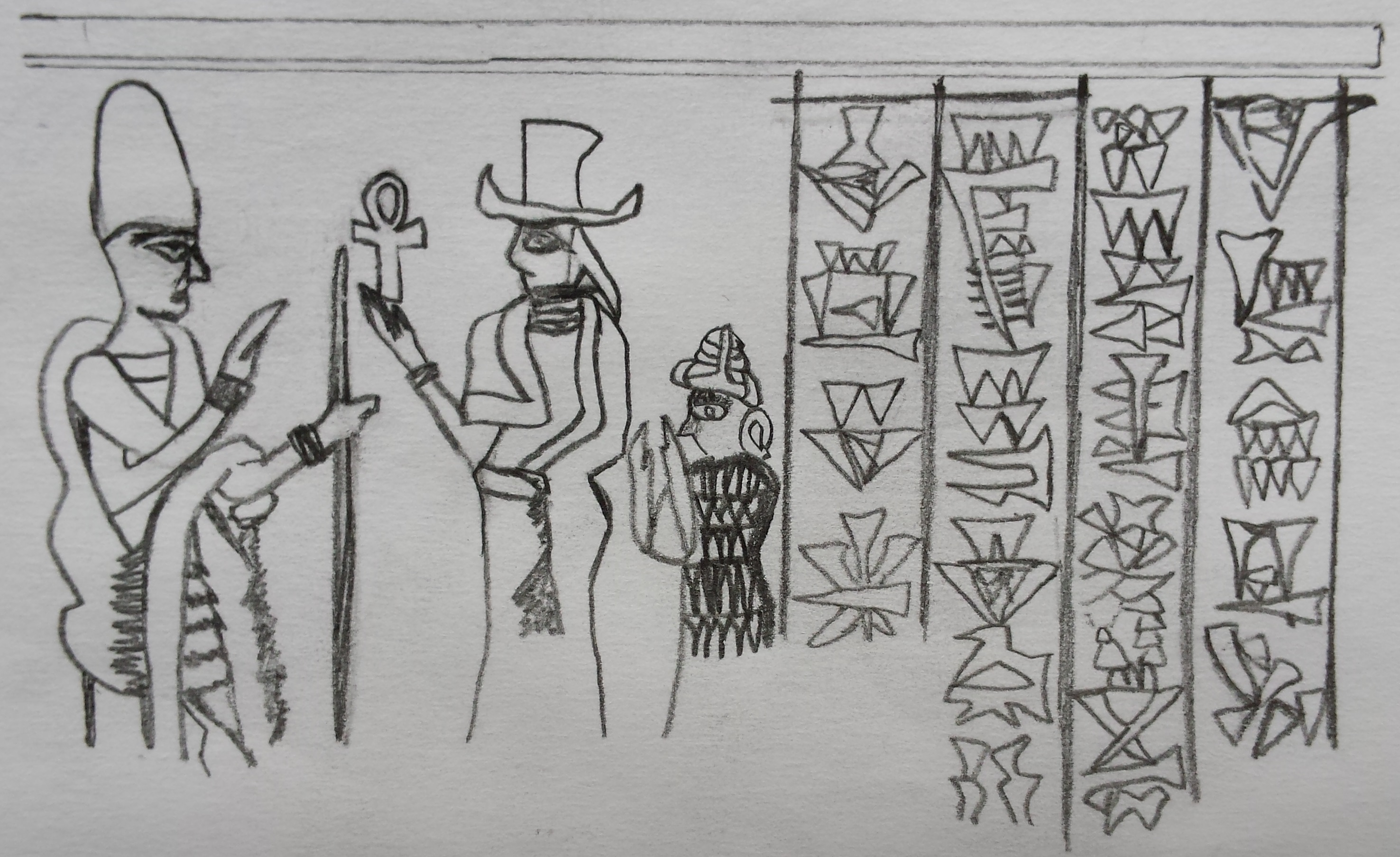

King of Yamhad
- Reign: c. 1700 - c. 1675 BC
- Predecessor: Yarim-Lim II
- Successor: Irkabtum
- Died: c. 1675 BC
- Issue: Irkabtum; Abba-El
- Father: Yarim-Lim II

Niqmi-Epuḫ, also given as Niqmepa (died c. 1675 BC) was the king of Yamhad (Halab) succeeding his father Yarim-Lim II.

== Reign ==
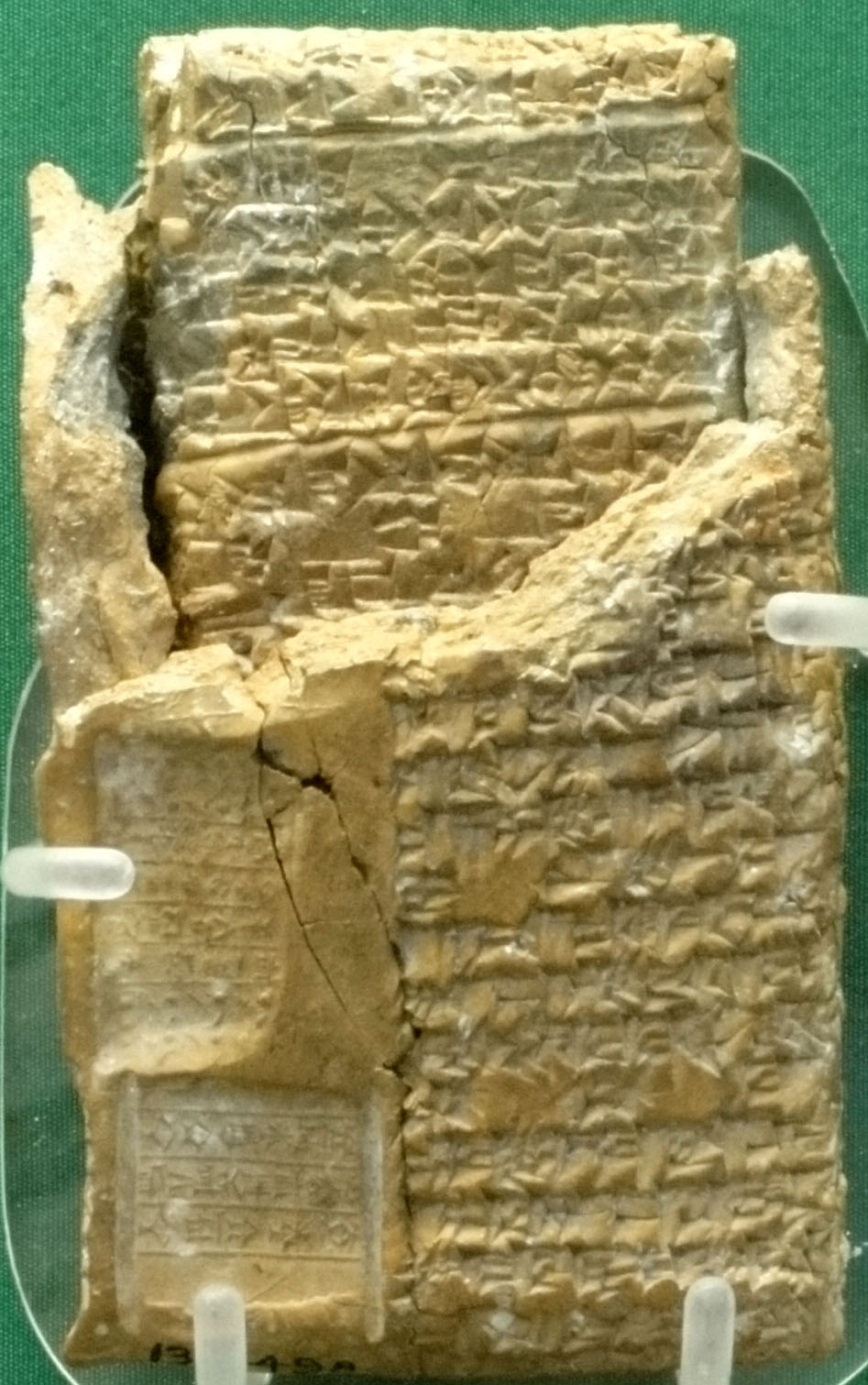
Legal case from Niqmi-Epuh to the king of Alalakh concerning the legacy of two houses

Little of Aleppo has been excavated by archaeologists. Knowledge about Niqmi-Epuh comes from tablets discovered at Alalakh. His existence is confirmed by a number of tablets with his seal on their envelope

Yarim-Lim king of Alalakh, uncle of Yarim-Lim II and vassal of Yamhad, died during Niqmi-Epuh's reign and was succeeded by his son Ammitakum, who started to assert Alalakh's semi-independence.

The tablets mention Niqmi-Epuh's votive status which he dedicated to Hadad and placed in that deity's Temple. Tablet AlT*11 informs of his return from Nishin, a place not known before, but certainly inside the territory of Yamhad because the tablet seems to refer to travel and not a military campaign.

Niqmi-Epuh's most celebrated deed was his conquest of the town Arazik, near Charchemish, the fall of this city was important to the extent of being suitable for dating several legal cases.

=== Niqmi-Epuh Seal ===
The seal of Niqmi-Epuh includes his name written in cuneiform inscription. The king is depicted wearing a crown, facing two goddesses, one in Syrian dress, while and the other is wearing Babylonian dress.

== Death and succession ==
Niqmi-Epuh died around 1675 BC. He seems to have a number of sons, including Irkabtum who succeeded him immediately, prince Abba-El, and possibly Yarim-Lim III. Hammurabi III, the last king before the Hittites conquest might have been his son too.

King Niqmi-Epuh of Yamhad (Halab) Yamhad dynasty Died: c. 1675 BC
Regnal titles
Preceded by Yarim-Lim II	King of Yamhad c. 1700 - c. 1675 BC	Succeeded by Irkabtum
