= Irkabtum =

King of Yamhad
- Reign: c. 1675 - c. 1658 BC
- Predecessor: Niqmi-Epuh
- Successor: Hammurabi II
- Died: c. 1658 BC
- Father: Niqmi-Epuh

Irkabtum (died c. 1658 BC) was the king of Yamhad (Halab), succeeding his father Niqmi-Epuh.

== Reign ==
Irkabtum is referred to in an old Hittite letter fragment, but he is known primarily through the Alalakh tablets. He engaged in the selling and buying of cities and villages with his vassal king Ammitakum of Alalakh in order to adjust the shared borders between them, and he campaigned in the region of Nashtarbi east of the Euphrates River, against the Hurrian princes who rebelled against Yamhad. The campaign was an important one in that it was used to date legal cases.

Irkabtum is known to have concluded a peace treaty with Semuma, the king of the Habiru, on behalf of his vassal kingdom Alalakh, indicating the importance and danger of those autonomous warriors in the region.

== Death and succession ==
Irkabtum could be the father of Yarim-Lim III. He died and was succeeded by Hammurabi II whose filiation is unknown.

King Irkabtum of Yamhad (Halab) Yamhad dynasty
Regnal titles
Preceded by Niqmi-Epuh	King of Yamhad c. 1675 - c. 1658 BC	Succeeded by Hammurabi II
