= Cuneiform inscriptions found in Israel and Palestine =

Cuneiform inscriptions from Israel and Palestine

The cuneiform inscriptions found in Israel and Palestine are a small but varied body of texts in cuneiform recovered from sites across the area of modern Israel and Palestine. The inscriptions show that the region participated in the wider scribal culture of the Ancient Near East, with texts ranging from legal and administrative records to scholarly, diplomatic, and formulaic inscriptions, with scattered distribution and mixed origins. The published corpus includes 91 texts, with finds from many sites and several scripts and languages, especially Akkadian, as well as Sumerian and Elamite.

They are among the earliest written sources from the region. The corpus shows that cuneiform remained important in diplomatic, legal, and administrative settings after alphabetic scripts appeared, and allow scholars to begin reconstructing how the region of modern Israel and Palestine fit into the ancient Near Eastern world.

== Overview ==
The collection is found on tablets, seals, and other inscribed items. The most notable findspots include Tel Hazor, Jerusalem, Tel Megiddo, Tel Aphek, Gezer, and Tel Hadid, where the texts often appear in fragmentary form or as isolated objects rather than in large archives. Hazor yielded the largest known group of cuneiform texts from the region and has yielded legal fragments that closely resemble Mesopotamian law collections. The Jerusalem fragment is the oldest written document known from the city, dating to the 14th century BCE.

Some texts belong to the Late Bronze Age world of Ancient Egyptian, Hittite, and Levantine diplomacy, while others date to the Assyrian period and preserve the movement of deportees, goods, and scribes.

The Hazor law fragments have attracted scholarly attention because they echo the structure of the Hammurabi tradition, perhaps bearing witness to the transmission of Mesopotamian learning westward into the Levant.

== Table ==
In 1971, Albert Glock published a list of 26 then-known cuneiform inscriptions from the region.

The table below shows all 91 cuneiform sources known from the region as of 2006.

	By period						By genre							
Site	Total (Note: Items with unclear dates, either the first or second millennium BCE, are indicated in parentheses.)	Middle Bronze Age (MB)	Late Bronze Age (LB)	Uncertain (Note: Second-millennium BCE items which are likely Late Bronze Age, but could be Middle Bronze Age.)	Neo-Assyrian	Late	Administrative Documents	Letters	Royal Inscriptions	Private Inscriptions	Academic Tablet (Note: The Lamaštu plaque, lexical lists, literary texts, liver models, mathematical texts and school tablets.)	Miscellaneous	Cylinder Seals	Alphabetic Cuneiform
Aphek	8		8				2	1			2	3		
Ashdod	4			1	3				3				1	
Ascalon	1		1								1			
Beer Sheva	1				1								1	
Ben Shemen	1				1				1					
Tell Beit Mirsim	1	1											1	
Beth Shean	2	1	1					1					1	
Beth Shemesh	1		1											1
Gezer	5 (1)		1	1	2		3	1				1		
Hadid	2				2		2							
Hazor	15	8	5	2			5	3		3	4			
Hebron	1	1					1							
el-Hesi	1		1					1						
Jemmeh	1	1											1	
Jericho	3		1	2			1						2	
Keisan	1				1		1							
Khirbet Kusiya	1				1		1							
Megiddo	5 (1)		4							1	1		3	
Mikhmoret	1					1	1							
en-Nasbeh	1					1 (Note: Either Neo-Assyrian or later.)				1				
Qaqun	1				1				1					
Samaria	7				4	3	2		1			3	1	
Sepphoris	4					4 (Note: Sepphoris 1 from the Persian period. Sepphoris 2–4 either Neo-Assyrian or later.)	3		1					
Shechem	3 (1)	1	1				1	1				1		
Shephelah	1				1						1			
Taanach	17		17				6	9					1	1
Tabor	1		1											1
Wingate	1				1						1			
Total	91 (3)	13	42	6	18	9	29	17	7	5	9	8	13	3

== Bibliography ==
- Glock, Albert E. (1971). "A New Ta'annek Tablet". Bulletin of the American Schools of Oriental Research. 204: 17–30. doi:10.2307/1356134. ISSN 0003-097X.
- Aster, Shawn-Zelig; Faust, Avraham (2015). "Administrative Texts, Royal Inscriptions and Neo-Assyrian Administration in the Southern Levant: The View from the Aphek-Gezer Region". Orientalia. 84 (3). GBPress- Gregorian Biblical Press: 292–308. ISSN 0030-5367. JSTOR 26153357.
- Horowitz, Wayne; Oshima, Takayoshi; Sanders, Seth L. (2006). Cuneiform in Canaan: Cuneiform Sources from the Land of Israel in Ancient Times. Israel Exploration Society. ISBN 978-965-221-062-3.
- Horowitz, Wayne; Oshima, Takayoshi; Sanders, Seth L. (2018). Cuneiform in Canaan: The Next Generation. Pennsylvania State University Press. ISBN 978-1-57506-791-9.
- Van Wyk, Koot (2019-07-13). "Corpus of Cuneiform Tablets from Palestine". Louishester Publication. 60.
