= Yarim-Lim II =

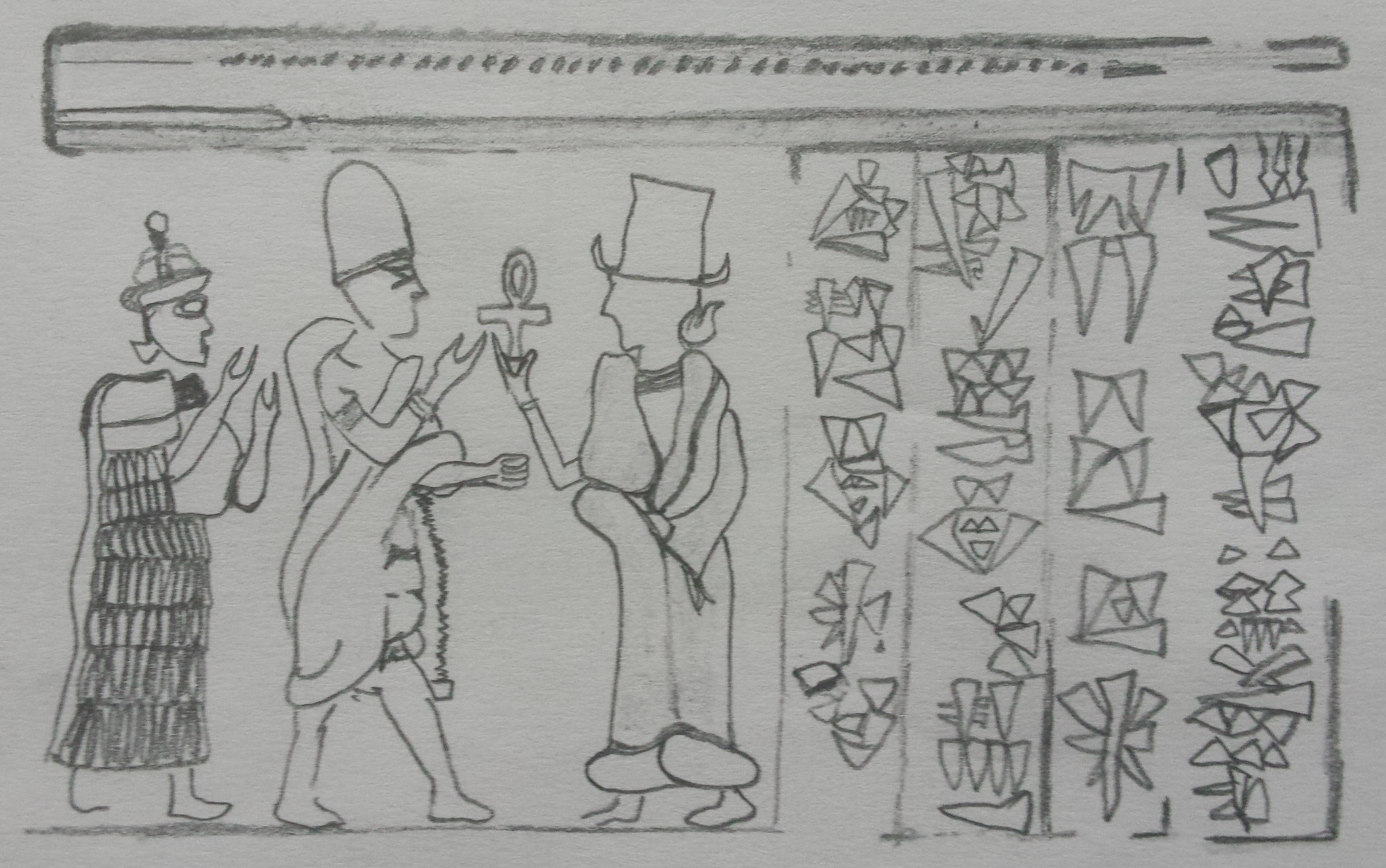

King of Yamhad
- Reign: c. 1720 - c. 1700 BC
- Predecessor: Abba-El I
- Successor: Niqmi-Epuh
- Died: c. 1700 BC
- Issue: Niqmi-Epuh

Yarim-Lim II (died c. 1700 BC) was the king of Yamhad (Halab, Aleppo).

== Reign ==
Little of Aleppo has been excavated by archaeologists and knowledge about Yamhad and its kings mainly comes from tablets discovered at Alalakh and Mari. Little is known about Yarim-Lim II. His existence is confirmed by a seal inscription discovered at Alalakh, where he designates himself as son of Abba-El I and "beloved of the god Hadad". One of his ministers was Ini-Kubaba, known from his seal inscription found in Alalakh.

=== Identity ===
The identity of this king is under dispute: Abba-El I had a brother called Yarim-Lim to whom he gave the kingdom of Alalakh. The king of Alalakh mentions that he is the son of Hammurabi I, and Yarim-Lim II in his seal inscription mentions that he is the son of Abba-El I, however Moshe Weinfeld suggests that Yarim-Lim II of Yamhad is the same Yarim-Lim of Alalakh. He believes that the seal which mentions that Yarim-Lim was a son of Abba-El belonged to Yarim-Lim, son of Hammurabi I, and that the reason for mentioning that Yarim-Lim is the son of Abba-El I in the seal inscription is that Abba-El adopted his brother in order to create the legal base for installing him as king.

This theory is hard to prove as there is no textual reference to any adoption and the fact that Yarim-lim's (the son of Hammurabi I) installation on the throne of Alalakh happened long before the assumed adoption took place beside. There is also no need for an adoption to legitimize the grant of Alalakh to the king's brother.

== Death ==
Yarim-Lim II died around 1700 BC and was succeeded by his son Niqmi-Epuh

King Yarim-Lim II of Yamhad (Halab) Yamhad dynasty Died: c. 1700 BC
Regnal titles
Preceded by Abba-El I	King of Yamhad c. 1720 - c. 1700 BC	Succeeded by Niqmi-Epuh
