= Irridu =

Ancient city of Mesopotamia

Irridu (Irrite) was a city in northwestern Mesopotamia, likely located between Harran and Carchemish. It flourished in the middle and late Bronze Age before being destroyed by Assyria.

== Location ==
Iridu is known to have been along the route of the Euphrates river between Harran and Carchemish. Several sites have been proposed as the location of the city. The most likely is Tell Hajeb, a large (at least 80 hectares in area) mounded site two kilometers to the west of Arslan Tash a Aramaean city founded at the time of the destruction of Irudu. The sites of Akziyaret Tepe (with a fortification wall encompassing about 40 hectares) and Koҫlu Tepe (with a fortification system encompassing about 140 hectares) have also bee suggested.

== History ==
=== Middle Bronze IIA ===
The city was first mentioned in a letter from the king of Carchemish to Zimri-Lim of Mari. The letter suggested that Irridu had been a subject of Carchemish, and subsequently it came under the rule of Yamhad.

In the late 18th century BC, Zitraddu, the governor of the city, rebelled against its overlord Yarim-Lim. Consequently, Yarim-Lim's brother, the Great King Abba-El I of Yamhad (c. 1750-1720 BC) quashed the rebels violently to the extent of destroying the city and he compensated his brother by giving him Alalakh.

=== Late Bronze ===
After the fall of Aleppo, the capital of Yamhad, to the Hittite king Mursili I (c. 1590 BC), Irridu came under the control of Mittani. During the reign of Šuppiluliuma I of Hatti (c. 1350 BC), under prince Piyassili, occupied Irridu in their advance upon the Mittanian capital Washukanni and after the Hittites retreated, it became a regional center for Mittani until it was conquered by Middle Assyrian Empire ruler Adad-nirari I (c. 1305-1274 BC).

King Wasashatta of Mittani rebelled against the Assyrians and sought the help of the Hittites, but received none. Adad-nirari I attacked Mittani and conquered most of its cities. The royal family of Mittani escaped to Irridu but the Assyrians found them and deported them to Assyria. Irridu and many cities in its area were set on fire, destroyed, and sowed with salty plants.

== See also ==
- Cities of the ancient Near East
- History of the Hittites
- Mitanni
