= Amut-pi'el II =

King of Qatna
- Reign: c. 1772 – c. 1762 BC
- Predecessor: Ishi-Addu
- Died: c. 1750 BC
- Issue: Jaḫad-Abum
- Father: Ishi-Addu

Amut-pi'el II (died c. 1750 BC) was a king of Qatna in the 18th century BC, during the Middle Bronze IIA.

== Family ==
He was the son of king Ishi-Addu, and his own son and crown prince was named Jaḫad-Abum but it is not known if this heir succeeded due to lack of sources.

== Reign ==
"There is no king who is mighty by himself. Ten or fifteen kings follow Hammurabi the ruler of Babylon, a like number of Rim-Sin of Larsa, a like number of Ibal-pi-el of Eshnunna, a like number of Amut-piʾel of Qatanum, but twenty follow Yarim-Lim of Yamhad."

— A tablet sent to Zimri-Lim of Mari, showing that Amut-piʾel had 10-15 vassal kings.

His reign is attested in the archive of Mari between c. 1772-1762 BC, after which, Mari was destroyed by Hammurabi of Babylon and no more information is known about Amut-pi'el. Amut-pi'el II visited Ugarit and met the king of Mari in year 8 of Zimri-Lim's reign.

He was contemporary with Yarim-Lim of Yamhad, Zimri-Lim of Mari, Hammurabi of Babylon, Ibal-pi-el of Eshnunna, and Rim-Sin I of Larsa.
