= Sumu-Epuh =

King of Yamhad
- Reign: c. 1810 - c. 1780 BC
- Successor: Yarim-Lim I
- Died: c. 1780 BC
- Spouse: Sumunna-Abi
- Issue: Yarim-Lim I

Sumu-Epuh (died c. 1780 BC) is the first attested king of Yamhad (Halab). He founded the Yamhad dynasty which controlled northern Syria throughout the 18th and 17th centuries BC.

== Reign ==
Although Sumu-Epuh's early life or the way he ascended the throne is not known, he is considered the first king of Yamhad, and his realm included Alalakh and Tuba. Sumu-Epuh entered the historical records when he was mentioned by Yahdun-Lim of Mari, as one of the leaders who fought against him. Yahdun-Lim was an ambitious ruler who campaigned in the north claiming to have reached the Mediterranean, in spite of having a dynastic alliance with Yamhad to oppose Assyria. Those campaigns caused Sumu-Epuh to support the Yaminite tribes centered at Tuttul against the Mariote king, who emerged victorious but was soon killed by his own son. Yahdun-Lim's death was followed by the conquest of Mari by Shamshi-Adad I of the Kingdom of Upper Mesopotamia.

=== War Against the Kingdom of Upper Mesopotamia ===
Sumu-Epuh aided by Khashshum attacked a kingdom in Zalmakum (a marshy region between the Euphrates and lower Balikh). Khashshum later shifted alliance and joined Shamshi-Adad, who surrounded Yamhad by alliances with the city of Urshu and king Aplahanda of Charchemish in the north, and by conquering Mari in the east (after the death of Yahdun-Lim) c. 1796 BC, and installing his son Yasmah-Adad on its throne. Shamshi-Adad then concluded an alliance with Yamhad's rival to south Qatna, by marrying his son Yashmah-Adad to princess Beltum, the daughter of Ishi-Addu, king of Qatna.

Sumu-Epuh welcomed Zimri-Lim, the heir of Mari who fled to Yamhad, in hope that he might be useful some day since in the eyes of the people of Mari, Zimri-Lim was the legitimate king. Shamshi-Adad's coalition attacked Aleppo but failed to take the city. Sumu-Epuh allied himself with the tribes of the Suteans and the Turukkaeans, who attacked the Assyrian king from the east and the south. Sumu-Epuh also conquered the Assyrian fortress Dur-Shamshi-Adad and renamed it Dur-Sumu-Epuh.

== Death and legacy ==
Sumu-Epuh apparently was killed c. 1780 BC during his fight with Shamshi-Adad. His successor was Yarim-Lim I, his son by his queen Sumunna-Abi. The dynasty of Sumu-Epuh continued to hold power in the Levant until c. 1344 BC.

King Sumu-Epuh of Yamhad (Halab) Yamhad dynasty Died: c. 1780 BC
Regnal titles
Preceded by	King of Yamhad c. 1810 - c. 1780 BC	Succeeded by Yarim-Lim I
