= Kingdom of Upper Mesopotamia =

Mesopotamian kingdom of the early 2nd millennium BC

- c. 1809 BC–c. 1735 BC
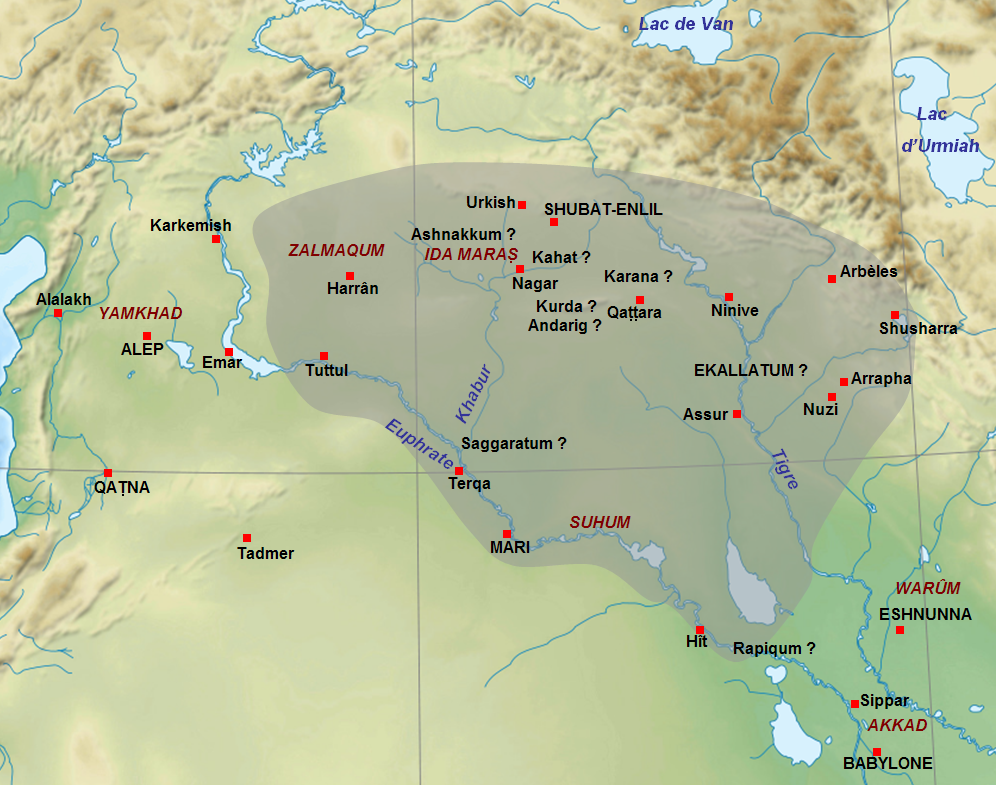
- Map of the approximate extension of the kingdom under Shamshi-Adad I around 1776 BC just before his death, with the territories given to his sons Ishme-Dagan I (around Ekallatum) and Yasmah-Adad (around Mari)
- Capital: Ekallatum, Šubat-Enlil
- Common languages: Akkadian, Amorite, Hurrian
- Government: Absolute monarchy
- Monarch
  - c. 1809–c. 1776 BC: Shamshi-Adad I
  - c. 1776–c. 1765 BC: Ishme-Dagan I
- Historical era: Middle Bronze Age
  - Established: c. 1809 BC
  - Disestablished: c. 1735 BC
Succeeded by
Babylon

The Kingdom of Upper Mesopotamia (also Royaume de Haute-Mésopotamie and Upper Mesopotamian Kingdom) was an ancient Near East kingdom in Mesopotamia during early 2nd millennium BC, part of the rise of Amorite power in the region. It is largely known from texts found at Mari, Chagar Bazar, Tell Bi’a (Tuttul), and Tell Shemshara. It was bordered on the west by the Yamhad kingdom and on the east by the Eshnunna kingdom, Babylon being a minor power at that time. At the height of its power it controlled a wide swath of Mesopotamia the largest since the fall of the Ur. Its main leadership figures were Shamshi-Adad I and his sons Ishme-Dagan I and Yasmah-Adad. After a period of decline following the death of Shamshi-Adad I, its territory was largely absorbed by Mari, Yamhad, and Eshnunna leaving a small rump state centered on Ekallatum. The later rulers of the Middle Assyria attempted to make the much earlier Kingdom of Upper Mesopotamia a part of the historical backstory for their reign. This type of revisionist history is not unusual and was often practiced by regimes in this period to support their right to rule. The much later literary composition Assyrian King List thought to have been written in the time of Assyrian ruler Ashurnasirpal I mentions the rulers of Upper Mesopotamia and attempts to legitimize this. The Assyrians also rebranded Šamši-Adad as Šamši-Adad I and Išme-Dagan as Išme-Dagan I to fit them into a mythical list of Assyrian rulers.

The Kingdom of Upper Mesopotamia grew out of the as yet unlocated city of Ekallatum. It was largely built by its first ruler, Amorite Shamshi-Adad I and Ekallatum was the kingdoms first political capital. Later the political capital was moved to Šubat-Enlil. Despite its great scope the kingdom was without many features of many other Mesopotamian kingdoms like centralized irrigation, taxation, or religion. Nor was there a state language with Amorite, Hurrian, and Akkadian all in use. The full range of Mesopotamian gods were observed including Dagan, Assur, Istar, and Enlil. Early in the formation of the kingdom the cultic center of Assur was conquered and later became one of the kingdoms cultic sites along with Nurrugum, Mari, and others. Shamshi-Adad I once complained in a text to his son Yasmah-Adad that Mari and Assur "are full of gods", (Mari u Assur-ma ša ilānī malû).

Polities conquered by Upper Mesopotamia abandoned the traditional method of dating by year names and switched to the Ekallatum system of using eponyms. With the decline of the kingdom, most of those polities returned to the traditional system aside from the area that later became Assyria where the eponym dating system remained and continued well into the 1st millennium BC. Polities switching to eponym dating included Mari and the currently unlocated Tigunānum. Based on an analysis of these eponyms it has been suggested that Shamshi-Adad I lived to an age of 70. Interestingly there are a few traditional year names of Yasmah-Adad while he ruled as governor at Mari, presumably before Mari transitioned to a eponym system. These include "Year in which Samsi-Addu seized Mar-Addu and built there the temple of Dagan" and "Year in which Yasmah-Addu brought Nergal into his temple".

== History ==
Almost all contemporary textual sources for the kingdom come from cuneiform texts found at Mari where correspondence of Yasmah-Adad with Shamshi-Adad I and Ishme-Dagan I were discovered along with smaller amounts at Chagar Bazar (possibly Ašnakkum), Tell Bi'a (possiblu Tuttul) and Šušarra. Ekallatum has not yet been found and few relevant cuneiform texts have yet been uncovered at Šubat-Enlil (the excavators at the site focused on earlier periods and not the 2nd millennium BC). The extant Šubat-Enlil texts date from after the death of Shamshi-Adad I and had been used as construction fill. They dated a few generations later and concerned two local rulers of Šubat-Enlil. It is thought that some of the more important Mari texts were removed by officials of Hammurabi after Babylon's conquest of that city and its then ruler Zimri-Lim. Some of the texts from the time of the rule of Yasmah-Adad found at Mari had been kept there well after the return of local rule. The texts found at Šušarra are of its ruler Kuwari, a vassal of Upper Mesopotamia.

The kingdom grew to the west with the defeat of Mari under its ruler Sumu-Yamam. The conflict had begun earlier as shown by year names of the previous Mari ruler Yahdun-Lim "Year in which Yahdun-Lim set on fire the harvest of the land of Samsi-Addu" and "Year in which Yahdun-Lim was victorious against the army of Samsi-Addu at the gate of Nagar". Other polities in that region such as that at Tell Barri and Tell Leilan were also brought into the kingdom. Šamši-Adad claimed to have visited the Mediteranean Sea, eumulating Naram-Sin of Akkad with who he linked himself saying, in a temple inscription, "I erected a stele (inscribed) with my great name in the country Lab’an on the shore of the Great Sea.". Nineveh, then part of the kingdom of Nurrugum, fell after a few weeks and the city of Nurrugum, extending to both sides of the Tigris River north of Ekallatum, fell after a year long siege with many of its inhabitants absorbed in the Kingdom of Upper Mesopotamia army. Shamshi-Adad I began major religious construction in the newly captured Nineveh including the Ištar Emenue temple and the adjacent E-kitus-kug ziggurat. An inscription read:

"Samsi-Addu, the strong, the king of the totality, superintendent of Enlil, deputy of Aggur, beloved of Egtar. The temple Emenue, which is on the site of the old temple of the Emasmas, which Man-ištušu, son of Sargon, king of Agade, built, had fallen into ruin. Since the fall of Agade until my reign, until the capture of Nurruguim, seven generations having passed, no king among my predecessors had rebuilt this temple. ... The monumental inscriptions of Mani?tu?u and his foundation inscriptions, (I swear that) I did not destroy them and [that I put] them [back in] their [place]] ..."

The Amorite Yaˀilānum tribe that lived in that region was completely destroyed.

At that point the kingdom to the east extended not far past Assur. Later the Kingdom of Upper Mesopotamia began expanding to the east beginning with the sack of Arrapḫa. Late in his reign Shamshi-Adad I, having formed an alliance with Dadusha of Eshnunna, conquered the Hurian plain east of the Tigris River including Arrapḫa and Qabra (unlocated but thought to be Kurd Qaburstan). The Hurian Turukkean alliance further east then collapsed, Eshunna to the north also expanding at this time, and Šušarra under its ruler Kuwari became a vassal of Upper Mesopotamia to gain protect from Gutium to the east. That region later rose in revolt, with Susarra being destroyed, and Išme-Dagan had to defeat an army of 10,000 men. At that point, Upper Mesopotamia partially withdrew from the region and resettled its supporters there near Qabra. At this time the city of Qatna under its ruler Ishi-Addu was a strong ally. Dam-Hurasi, the daughter of Ishi-Addu married Yasmah-Adad, son of Shamshi-Adad I, who at that time ruled the city of Mari for his father. Amut-pi'el II, the successor of Ishi-Addu, shifted the allegiance of Qatna to Zimri-Lim of Mari. In a joint action with Babylon and Eshnunna the cities of Diniktum and Malgium were also taken.

When the kingdom had reached its full size, Shamshi-Adad I retired to Šubat-Enlil leaving the day to day running of the kingdom to his sons Ishme-Dagan I in Ekallatum ruling the regions to the east and Yasmah-Adad in Mari those to the west though on occasion he left to personally deal with the aggression of Yamhad. Yasmah-Adad ruled in Mari for about 20 years. The death of Šamši-Adad marked the beginning of the decline of the Kingdom of Upper Mesopotamia. His death was so important in the region that it was marked by the 5th year name of Eshnunna ruler Ibal-pi-el II "Year Samsi-Addu died". After the death of Shamshi-Adad I, much of its territory to the west was conquered by Mari, after forcing out Yasmah-Adad, and Eshnunna absorbed the remainder in the west. Ishme-Dagan I continued as ruler of the remaining rump state, essentially the city and area of Ekallatum. In a text from that period, Shamshi-Adad I called himself

"[Šam]ši-Adad, strong king, appointee of the god [Enlil], vice-regent of the god Aššur, beloved of the god Dagan, unifiyer of the land between the Tigris and Euphrates, prince of [Mar]i, king of Ekallatum, governor of Š[ubat- En]lil (…)"

The fate of Yasmah-Adad is unclear though he is generally thought to have escaped from Mari and briefly resided in Šubat-Enlil before disappearing from history.

It is known that two fortresses Dūr-Samsī-Addu and Dūr-Addu were built (or possibly conquered and renamed) by Šamši-Adad and were later conquered by SūmūĒpuḫ, ruler of Yamhad.

== Rulers ==
Portrait	Name	Reign	Lifespan
	Shamshi-Adad I	c. 1809 – c. 1776 BC	c. 1847 – c. 1776 BC
	Ishme-Dagan I	c. 1776 – c. 1765 BC	Died c. 1765 BC

== See also ==
- Cities of the Ancient Near East
- List of Mesopotamian deities
- List of Mesopotamian dynasties
- Mari Eponym Chronicle
- Short chronology timeline
