= Yarim-Lim I =

King of Yamhad
- Reign: c. 1780 - c. 1764 BC
- Predecessor: Sumu-Epuh
- Successor: Hammurabi I
- Died: c. 1764 BC
- Spouse: Gashera
- Issue: Hammurabi I Shibtu
- Father: Sumu-Epuh
- Mother: Sumunna-Abi

Yarim-Lim I, also given as Yarimlim, (died c. 1764 BC) was the second king of the ancient Amorite kingdom of Yamhad in modern-day Aleppo, Syria.

== Family ==
=== Parentage ===
Yarim-Lim was the son and successor of the first king Sumu-Epuh and his queen consort Sumunna-Abi.

=== Wife and Children ===
His wife was Gashera, of unknown parents. She outlived her husband and became a strong-willed widow who was part of politics during the reign of Hammurabi.

Their daughter Shibtu married Zimri-Lim of Mari.

== Reign ==
=== Early Reign and Conflicts ===
The kingdom of Yamhad was being threatened by Shamshi-Adad I of the Kingdom of Upper Mesopotamia who had surrounded Yamhad through his alliance with Carchemish and Urshu to the north, Qatna to the south, and conquering Mari to the east, appointing his son Yasmah-Adad on its throne. Yarim-Lim ascended the throne after his father was killed during his campaigns against Shamshi-Adad. He was able to stand up to Shamshi-Adad. Hammurabi and Ibal-pi-el II were his allies.

Around 1777 BC, Yarim-Lim conquered the city of Tuttul. He appointed his ally, Zimri-Lim, the heir to the throne of Mari, as king. When Shamshi-Adad I died around 1776 BC, he helped Zimrilim regain his throne in Mari and oust Yasmah-Adad. Two days after the marriage ceremony, queen Sumunna-Abi died.

Ibal-pi-el II of Eshnuna exploited the death of Shamshi-Adad I to pursuit an expansionist policy, advancing on the account of Assyria and causing stress to the alliance. He later allied himself with Elam, the enemy of Hammurabi who was Yarim-Lim's ally.

==== Relations with Mari ====
Zimri-Lim's ascension to the throne with the help of Yarim-Lim I affected the status of Mari, Zimri-Lim referred to Yarim-Lim as his father and acted under the guidance of the Yamhadite main deity Hadad, of which Yarim-Lim was the mediator.

The tablets of Mari recorded many events that revealed Zimri-Lim's subordination. On two occasions, Zimri-Lim demanded the extradition of his subordinates from Yarim-Lim I. The first case was related to a vassal king of Zimri-Lim who addressed him as a brother instead of a father and the demand was refused, while the second was through the Mariote ambassador in Aleppo Daris-Libur in which Zimri-Lim asked for some fugitives to which Yarim-Lim answered with decline twice before agreeing on the Mariote ambassador's third attempt.

At one instance, Nur-Sin the Mariote ambassador in Aleppo wrote to his master for the handing of an estate called Alahtum to Hadad (meaning Aleppo), and in another instance, Ibal-pi-el offered peace and fixing the borders to Zimri-Lim who sent envoys to Yarim-Lim asking for authorization which was not given, leading Zimri-Lim to refuse the treaty on three occasions.

=== Later Reign and Succession ===
There is no king who is mighty by himself. Ten or fifteen kings follow Hammurabi the ruler of Babylon, a like number of Rim-Sin of Larsa, a like number of Ibal-pi-el of Eshnunna, a like number of Amud-pi-el of Qatanum, but twenty follow Yarim-Lim of Yamhad.

— An excerpt from a tablet from the archives at Mari

Yarim-Lim extended his influence to Ugarit. The armies of Aleppo campaigned as far as Elam near the modern southern Iraqi-Iranian borders: a tablet discovered at Mari revealed the extent of those military interventions in Mesopotamia; the tablet includes a declaration of war against Dēr and Diniktum in retaliation for their evil deeds, a reminder to the king of Dēr about the military help given to him for 15 years by Yarim-Lim and the stationing of 500 Aleppan warships for 12 years in Diniktum. According to Historian William Hamblin, he was at the time "the mightiest ruler in the Near East outside of Egypt." He died c. 1764 BC and was succeeded by his son Hammurabi I.

Yarim-Lim I Yamhad dynasty Died: c. 1764 BC
Regnal titles
Preceded by Sumu-Epuh	King of Yamhad c. 1780 - c. 1764 BC	Succeeded by Hammurabi I
