= Hadabal =

Eblaite god

- Tutelary god of the Orontes valley
- Major cult center: Ebla, Luban, Larugadu, Hamadu
- Consort: Ba'altum (^{d}BAD.MUNUS)

Hadabal (also spelled 'Adabal) was a god worshiped in Ebla and its surroundings in the third millennium BCE. He was one of the main gods of that area, and appears frequently in Eblaite documents. His character is not well understood, though it has been proposed that he might have been an agricultural or lunar god. Like the city's tutelary god Kura and his wife Barama, he is absent from sources postdating the destruction of Ebla.

== Name and origin ==
The name Hadabal was written as ^{d}NI-da-KUL or ^{d}NI-da-BAL in Eblaite cuneiform. The KUL sign being a simplified version of BAL, employed in texts later than the time of the vizier Arrukum. Alfonso Archi assumes that it belonged to a linguistic substrate, similar to these of other Eblaite gods, including Adamma, Aštabi, Išḫara and Kura. The existence of a non-Semitic and non-Hurrian substrate language in ancient Syria has been first proposed by Igor M. Diakonoff, who in 1971 concluded that Išḫara and Kubaba, while worshiped by the Hurrians in Syria in the second millennium BCE, were in origin pre-Hurrian deities. This theory subsequently found support from other researchers, such as Volkert Haas, Alfonso Archi and Joan Goodnick Westenholz.

However, Semitic etymologies for Hadabal's name have also been proposed. Paolo Xella interprets it as yawda'-ba'l, "the lord knows," a name structurally similar to Itūr-Mēr and Yakrub-El known from the pantheon of Mari. Pelio Fronzaroli assumes that it might have been a way to render the name Hadda ba'l, "Hadda the lord," but according to Alfonso Archi this is implausible due to the only attested writings of the word ba'l from Ebla being ba-al_{6} or BAD. He points out that the short history of writing at Ebla makes it unlikely that another sign or signs could have been an additional archaic rendering. The assumption that Hadabal was an epithet of the weather god rather than an independent deity is also considered to be unconvincing by Daniel Schwemer.

== Character ==
Hadabal was likely the principal god of the Orontes valley in the third millennium BCE. It is possible he was an agricultural god. Alfonso Archi states that despite his prominence in Ebla his role and cosmological importance for the most part cannot be presently determined. Hadabal of Larugadu on occasion could receive maces as offerings in Ebla, but it occurred much less frequently than in the case of Haddu and Resheph, possibly indicating that if he had a warlike character, it was less pronounced than in the case of these two gods.

Hadabal had a spouse, referred to with the name Ba'altum (^{d}BAD.MUNUS), "the lady." She is mentioned around forty times in documents from Ebla, with twenty six of these mentions specifying she was associated with Hadabal of Luban. Statues of the pair are attested in a document dealing with offerings made in this location.

=== Moon god theory ===
Wilfred G. Lambert proposed that Hadabal was a moon god, as his cult center Larugadu might be the same place as Lrgt from Ugaritic texts, known to be a cult center of the moon god Yarikh in later times, as indicated by the Ugaritic ritual KTU 1.100: "[bring my voice to] Yariḫ in lrgt!" (line 26). Another researcher supporting this theory is Walther Sallaberger. However, it is considered implausible by Alfonso Archi, who points out the distribution of cult sites dedicated to Hadabal makes it unlikely his character was astral. Furthermore, a moon god analogous to Mesopotamian Sin, Suinu, was worshiped in Ebla. Lunar character has also been ascribed to another Eblaite deity, Saggar, though he might have only represented a specific phase of the Moon, as documents from Ebla point association with the crescent. Later evidence from Emar instead indicates a connection with the full moon.

== Worship ==
The three primary centers of Hadabal's cult outside Ebla were Luban (possibly located in the proximity of Mount Simeon), Larugadu (or Arugadu; possibly located near Jabal Zawiya) and Hamadu (modern Hama). Only the hypostases associated with the former two of these cities regularly received offerings in the royal palace in Ebla, possibly simply because they were located close. Luban was likely an isolated sanctuary, as it never appears in administrative documents in context other than offerings to its god. Another settlement associated with the worship of Hadabal, attested in relation to offerings the vizier Ibirim made to this deity, was Neau, possibly to be identified with Niya known from sources from the second millennium BCE. Traditions associated with the worship of Hadabal likely predates the period of Eblaite domination over surrounding areas. Alfonso Archi compares the position of Hadabal in the texts from Ebla to that of Dagan of Tuttul and Hadda of Halab: while in the third millennium none of their cult centers were political powers in their own right, all three of them worshiped over a large area nonetheless.

Hadabal is frequently mentioned in Eblaite administrative texts (105 mentions), with only the city god Kura appearing more often (130 mentions). No other deity appears even half as commonly in known texts. Collectively his various hypostases received more sacrificial animals even than Kura.

The head priestess of Hadabal was the dam-dingir. Their social status was high, and they were permitted to use the income from the lands under control of the Eblaite royal palace to support themselves, similar to the queen. The institution of dam-dingir has been compared to the en priestesses from Mesopotamia, the best known of whom was Sargon's daughter Enheduanna. It has been proposed that they acted as symbolic spouses of the god, and that they took part in a hypothetical sacred marriage rite, but this is unlikely, as another attested dam-dingir was instead responsible for worship of a female deity, Adamma. The dam-dingir of Hadabal were daughters or sisters of Eblaite kings, while those involved in the cults of other deities could be relatives of kings of smaller allied states, for example Ḫuzan,) or of Eblaite viziers. It has been proposed that the presence of members of the royal family of Ebla in the cult of Hadabal was meant to form an alliance between them and the god. Four dim-digir of Hadabal are known by name: Tirin-damu, Tinib-dulun, Tarib-damu and Amaga. Multiple of them were active at the same time.

In addition to dam-dingir, another type of priest of Hadabal attested in Eblaite texts was the pāšišu (pa_{4}-šeš), perhaps "he who anoints." While most gods only had a single pāšišu, Hadabal was served by two.

Despite being a high-ranking and commonly worshiped god, Hadabal is only attested in two theophoric names. One of them belonged to one of the sons of the vizier Ibirum, Iti-Hadabal. Alfonso Archi points out that with the exception of Hadabal and Kura, deities whose names might belong to a linguistic substrate are absent from Eblaite personal names. He proposes that the name-giving customs at Ebla might therefore commonly reflect a tradition predating the contact between speakers of the Eblaite language and the substrate language.

The main festival of Hadabal took the form of a pilgrimage. It was annual and involved visits in his sanctuary in Luban, the royal palace of Ebla, and other sacred locations throughout the kingdom, though not Larugadu and Hamadu. With the exception of Darib (modern Atarib), most of the places visited are difficult to identify, and it is possible that they were small agricultural settlements. Between five and fourteen members of ašeš-II-ib, a group connected to the palace took part in it. Alfonso Archi describes šeš-II-ib as a "religious confraternity," and notes that it was closely associated with the worship of Hadabal, though not exclusively associated with him, as its members also took part in ceremonies dedicated to other deities and in funerals. A separate pilgrimage's goal was Larugadu. It is not well documented, and apparently fewer members of šeš-II-ib took part in it. Additionally, Hadabal of Larugadu was celebrated in Ebla during a ceremony referred to as "the opening." Lauren Ristvet proposes that Eblaite pilgrimages were meant to provide the inhabitants of the kingdom of Ebla with a shared religious experience. It is also possible that by partaking in it the ruler could legitimize himself in the eyes of his subjects even in distant settlements. She assumes that a journey undertaken by the king as part of his coronation had a similar role, but the places visited do not overlap, with only Ebla itself and Darib visited both during the pilgrimage in honor of Hadabal and the royal ceremony. Additionally, the latter covered a much smaller area, while the pilgrimage likely reached areas distant from the city, located in the proximity of Amadu (modern Hama) and the Amik Valley.

Hadabal is no longer attested in sources postdating the destruction of Ebla, similar to Kura and his wife Barama.
