= List of Hurrian deities =

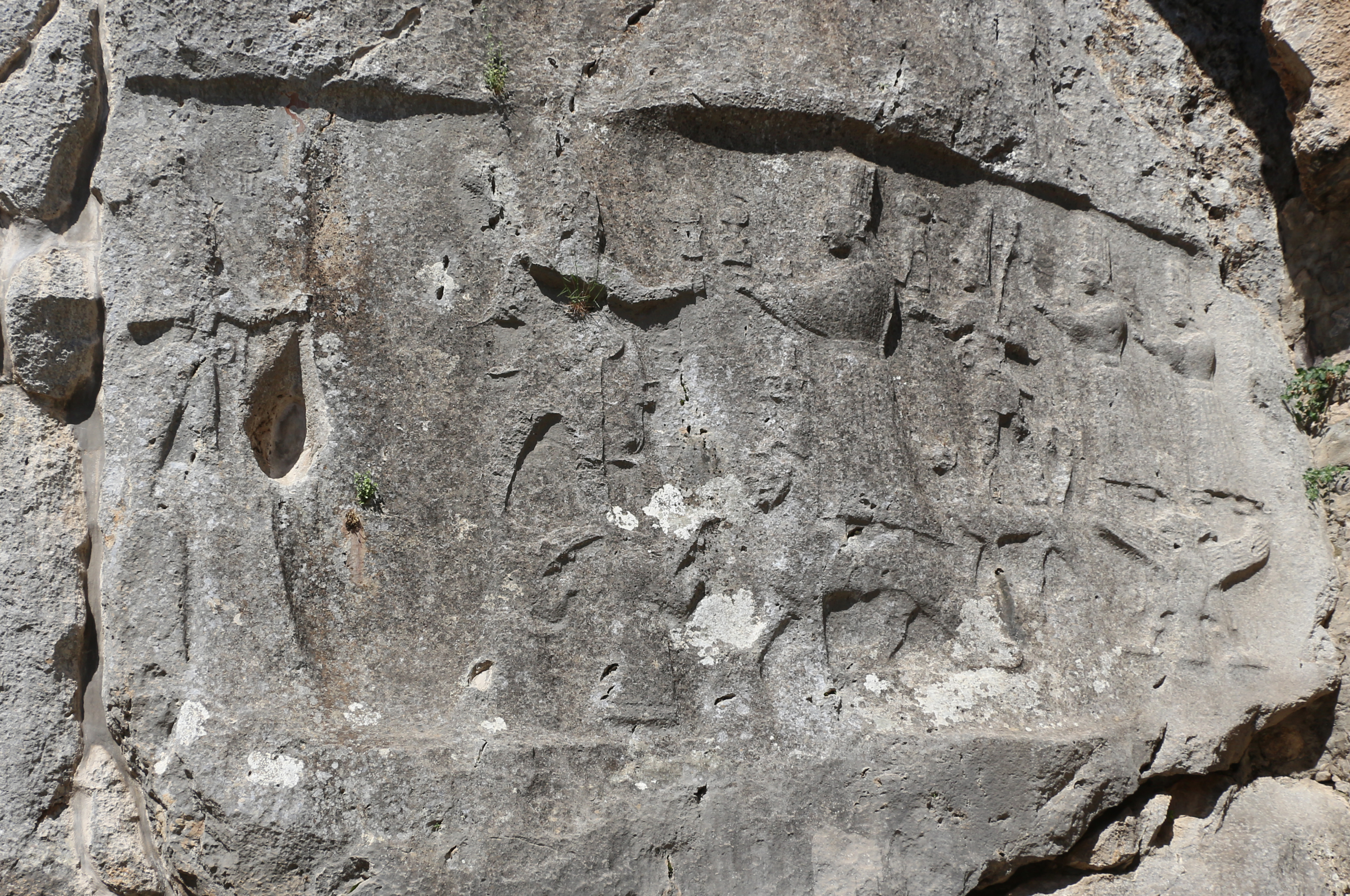
A relief of Hurrian deities Teššub and Ḫepat and their court from Yazılıkaya

The Hurrian pantheon consisted of gods of varied backgrounds, some of them natively Hurrian, while others adopted from other pantheons, for example Eblaite and Mesopotamian. Like the other inhabitants of the Ancient Near East, Hurrians regarded their gods as anthropomorphic. They were usually represented in the form of statues holding the symbols associated with a specific deity. The Yazılıkaya sanctuary, which was Hittite in origin but served as a center of the practice of Hurrian religion, is considered a valuable source of information about their iconography.

Hurrians organized their gods into lists known as kaluti or into similar lexical lists as the Mesopotamians. The formal structure of the pantheon was most likely based on either Mesopotamian or Syrian theology. The status of individual deities and composition of the pantheon could vary between individual locations, but some can nonetheless be identified as "pan-Hurrian."

The following list does not include deities only attested in the two Hurrian god lists whose names are transcriptions of Mesopotamian divine names, as it is unlikely that they were actively worshiped. Identification of the Yazılıkaya reliefs used in the image column follows Piotr Taracha's analysis from the monograph Religions of Second Millennium Anatolia.

== Major deities ==
Name	Image	Attested cult centers	Origin	Attested equivalencies	Details
Teššub	cemter	Kumme, Halab, Irrite, Arrapḫa, Kaḫat, Waššukkanni, Uḫušmāni	Hurrian	Ishkur/Hadad (Syrian and Mesopotamian), Baal (Ugaritic), Tarhunna (Hittite)	Teššub was the Hurrian king of the gods, as well as a weather deity. In Hurrian areas, as well as in these where the royal families were under the influence of Hurrian culture, he was often also the tutelary god of the ruling house. While it is assumed that he was not necessarily regarded as the head of the pantheon from the very beginning, he likely already acquired this role in the late third millennium BCE. His principal sanctuaries were Kumme, located east of the Upper Tigris, and Halab (modern Aleppo), where he merged with the local weather god Hadad. His name could be written logographically as ^{d}IM. A god with a cognate name, Teišeba, was present in the pantheon of Urartu, but his position was different.
Šauška		Nineveh, Nuzi, Šamuha, Hattarina, Lawazantiya, Tameninga	Hurrian	Inanna/Ishtar (Mesopotamian), Ashtart (Ugaritic), possibly Anzili (Hittite)	Šauška (šwšk or šušk in the Ugaritic alphabetic script) was the main goddess of the Hurrian pantheon in locations like the kingdom of Arrapḫa, Alalakh and Ugarit. Nineveh was particularly closely associated with her, and in myths she is often called the "Queen of Nineveh." She was regarded as the sister of Teššub, and by extension presumably as a daughter of Kumarbi and Anu, though references to the moon god as her father are also known. Her spheres of influence included war, love, magic and medicine. Šauška's gender could be ambiguous: in the Yazilikaya reliefs, Šauška is present both among gods and goddesses, while in a ritual text "female attributes" and "male attributes" are both mentioned. Her name could be written logographically as ^{d}IŠTAR. She was also introduced into the Mesopotamian pantheon, and appears in texts from Puzrish-Dagan, Umma, Isin and Uruk.
Kumarbi Kumurwe		Urkesh, Azuhinnu, Taite	Hurrian	Enlil (Mesopotamian), Dagan (Syrian), El (Ugaritic), Halki (Hittite)	Kumarbi was regarded as the "father of gods," and as one of the parents of Teššub. He might have also been the god of grain, though the evidence is inconclusive. His name might mean "he of Kumar," Kumar presumably being a place name, though other proposed etymologies connect it with Kumme, the cult center of Teššub, and with the word kum, "tower." He is also attested as one of the Hurrian deities from Taite in the Assyrian Tākultu ritual, alongside Nabarbi and Samnuha. In myths, he was described as allied with forces hostile to the rule of Teššub: the "former gods" inhabiting the underworld, gods and monsters living in the sea, and a stone giant named Ullikummi, "Destroy Kumme."
Ḫepat		Halab, Lawazantiya	Syrian	Sun goddess of Arinna (Hittite), Pidray (Ugaritic)	Ḫepat was the wife of the head of the Hurrian pantheon, Teššub. She was initially the wife of the storm god of Halab (Aleppo), Hadad. In some western locations her position in the pantheon surpassed that of Šauška, but in the eastern Hurrian centers she is only present in theophoric names and likely was not one of the major deities.
Šimige		No specific cult center, attested in sources from Urkesh, Tigunani, Alalakh, Nuzi, Arrapḫa, Tell al-Rimah and Chagar Bazar	Hurrian	Utu/Shamash (Mesopotamian), Shapash (Ugaritic), Sun god of Heaven (Hittite)	Šimige was the Hurrian sun god. His name means "sun." He also served as a god of oracles.A Hurrian incantation from Mari indicates that he was believed to have seven daughters. His name could be written logographically as ^{d}UTU. Due to syncretism between him and Shamash, Aya was adopted into the Hurrian pantheon as his wife, and one text from Hattusa lists Sippar as his cult city. It is also possible that the Hittite Sun god of Heaven was patterned after him, or was outright the same deity. A god with a cognate name, Šiwini, was also present in the pantheon of Urartu.
Kušuḫ Umbu		Kuzina (Harran), Šuriniwe	Hurrian	Sin (Mesopotamian), Yarikh (Ugaritic), Arma (Anatolian)	Kušuḫ was the Hurrian moon god. He was also the god of oaths. His name might be derived from Kuzina, the Hurrian name of Harran. In a single text he is named as the father of Teššub. His name could be represented logographically as ^{d}EN.ZU or ^{d}XXX. It is unclear if Umbu was his alternate name, a manifestation linked to a specific phase of the moon, or a separate moon god originating in an unidentified Anatolian or Syrian pantheon. Origin in the northern part of Jezirah has been proposed, though a Hurrian etymology is also not implausible. In Kizzuwatna, Kušuḫ was syncretised with the Luwian moon god Arma, and they were depicted identically in art.
Allani Allatum		Ḫaššum, Zimudar	Hurrian	Ereshkigal (Mesopotamian), Lelwani (Hattic/Hittite), Sun goddess of the Earth (Hittite), Arsay (Ugaritic)	Allani ("the lady") was the goddess of the underworld. She resided in a palace located at the gates of the land of the dead. While according to Gernot Wilhelm she was only worshiped in the western Hurrian areas, Tonia Sharlach in a more recent publication points out that Mesopotamian sources seem to associate her with Zimudar, a city in the Diyala area. She is well attested in theophoric names from the Tur Abdin area as well.
Išḫara		Ebla, Alalakh, Emar, Kizzuwatna	Syrian (Eblaite)		Išḫara was originally one of the deities of Ebla in the third millennium BCE, and served as the tutelary goddess of the royal family. Later she came to be incorporated into the pantheons of various cultures of ancient Anatolia, Syria and Mesopotamia. She had a variety of functions, including those of a love goddess, guardian of oaths, disease deity and underworld goddess associated with divine ancestors. She was frequently associated with Allani, most likely based on their shared association with the underworld, and they could be worshiped as a dyad.
Hayya Ea		Hattusa	Mesopotamian	Kothar-wa-Khasis (Ugaritic)	Hayya was the Hurrian spelling of the name of the Mesopotamian god of wisdom Ea, who most likely was incorporated into Hurrian religion in the Sargonic period. He was referred to with his Akkadian epithets, such as "lord of wisdom," and played the same role as in Mesopotamia in Hurrian sources. According to Alfonso Archi, his position in the Hurrian pantheon was comparable to that of gods like Kumarbi or Kušuḫ, and to that he held in Babylonia. He is well attested in Mitanni sources.
Hutena and Hutellura		Ugarit, Halab, Hattusa	Hurrian	Gulšes and Ḫannaḫanna (Hittite), Kotharāt (Ugaritic), Šassūrātu (Mesopotamian)	Hutena and Hutellura were goddesses of fate and divine midwives. It is possible they were similarly believed to be responsible for forming the child during pregnancy. It has been proposed that Hutena means "she of favoring" and Hutellura (or Hutelluri) - "midwife." Piotr Taracha assumes the names might only refer to a pair of goddesses, but it has also been proposed that the term referred to a heptad of deities similar to Ugaritic Kotharāt. It is also possible that Hutena and Hutellura were based on the latter group.
Nabarbi		Taite	Hurrian or Syrian	possibly Belet Nagar (Syrian)	Nabarbi ("she of Nawar," from Hurrian naw, "pasture") was a goddess worshiped chiefly in the Upper Khabur area. Piotr Taracha argues that Nabarbi is one and the same as Belet Nagar, and therefore believes she should not be considered a Hurrian deity in origin. However, according to Alfonso Archi Nawar from Nabarbi s name and Nagar from Belet Nagar s name were two distinct places. At the same time, he does not rule out the possibility that Nabarbi and Belet Nagar were identified with each other. Nabarbi is also attested as one of the Hurrian deities from in the Neo-Assyrian Tākultu ritual, alongside Kumarbi and Samnuha.
Nergal		Arrapḫa, Azuhinnu, Kurruhanni, Ulamme, possibly Urkesh	Mesopotamian		Nergal, the Mesopotamian god of war and death, was worshiped in various locations in the eastern Hurrian kingdoms, including the city of Arrapḫa itself. In Azuhinnu he was regarded as the third most prominent member of the pantheon after Teššub and Šauška. He was also worshiped in Ulamme, where he was associated with a goddess referred to as "^{d}IŠTAR Ḫumella," whose identity remains unknown. It is possible that in some cases in the west his name served as a logographic representation of one belonging to a Hurrian god (proposals include Aštabi and Kumarbi), but it also cannot be ruled out that he was worshiped under his Mesopotamian name there as well.
Nupatik Lubadag, Lubadig, Nubadig, Nubandag		Urkesh, Carchemish, Ugarit	Hurrian		Nupatik was one of the "pan-Hurrian" gods, but his character, functions and genealogy are poorly known. He appears already in the inscriptions of Hurrian king Atalšen of Urkesh, where his name is spelled syllabically (^{d}Lu-ba-da-ga), rather than logographically. He is also present in Hurrian texts from Ugarit, where his name is spelled in the local alphabetic script as Nbdg.
Tilla		Ulamme, Nuzi, Kuruḫanni	Hurrian		Tilla was a god worshiped in eastern Hurrian cities in the kingdom of Arrapḫa, such as Nuzi and Kuruḫanni (modern Tell al-Fakhar). An entu priestess dedicated to him lived in the latter city. Documents from Nuzi indicate he was very commonly worshiped in the east, and he appears in theophoric names with comparable frequency to Teššub. While he is commonly described as a "bull god" in modern literature, there is presently no evidence that he was necessarily depicted as a bull. The only exception is the myth Song of Ullikummi, where he a is one of the two bulls who pull Teššub's chariot, the other one being Šeriš, but in most other sources, such as offering lists, Šeriš is paired with Hurriš, not Tilla.

== Minor or local deities ==
Name	Image	Attested cult centers	Origin	Attested equivalencies	Details
Adamma			Syrian (Eblaite)		Adamma was a goddess originally regarded as the spouse of Resheph in Ebla. In the Hurrian pantheon she was instead associated with Kubaba.
Allanzu					Allanzu was one of the two daughters of Ḫepat and Teššub. She could be referred to as šiduri ("young woman"). In the first millennium BCE, she continued to be worshiped by Luwians under the name Alasuwa.
Ammarik		Haššum	Syrian		Ammarik was a mountain god already worshiped in Ebla in the third millennium BCE, later incorporated into the Hurrian pantheon.
Anat		Ugarit	Ugaritic		Anat was an Ugaritic goddess regarded as warlike. She appears regularly in Hurrian offering lists from Ugarit, according to Daniel Schwemer most likely because she had no close counterpart in the Hurrian pantheon, unlike the other local gods such as Baʿal, ʿAštart, Šapšu, Yariḫ or Yam. The only other deity of Ugaritic origin attested in them is ʾEl, her father.
Aranzaḫ			Hurrian		Aranzaḫ was a divine personification of the river Tigris. In the Song of Kumarbi, his name is written with the determinative ID ("river") rather than with a dingir, the sign designating divine names in cuneiform. In the poorly preserved myth about the hero Gurparanzaḫ, he appears in an active role as his ally.
Aštabi		Alalakh, Ugarit, originally Ebla	Syrian (Eblaite)	Attar (Ugaritic), Ninurta, Lugal-Marada (Mesopotamian)	Aštabi (aštb in the alphabetic script from Ugarit) was a warrior god. While he was initially viewed as a god of Hurrian origin by researchers, further discoveries revealed that his background was Eblaite. His name could be represented logographically as ^{d}NIN.URTA. He is absent from eastern Hurrian sources.
Ayakun			Hurrian	Ninsun, Alammuš (Mesopotamian)	Ayakun is a deity known from the trilingual god list from Ugarit, where this name is treated as the Hurrian explanation of two Mesopotamian deities, Ninsun and Alammuš. According to Frank Simons the reasoning behind this equation is difficult to explain.
Ayu-Ikalti			Mesopotamian		Ayu-Ikalti was the Hurrian spelling of Aya kallatu, "Aya, the bride," the name and most common epithet of the wife of Mesopotamian sun god Shamash. The Hurrians regarded her as the wife of Šimige.
Belet Nagar		Nagar, Urkesh	Syrian		Belet Nagar, "lady of Nagar," was a Syrian goddess. Similar as in the case Assyrian city Assur and its god, her name was derived from the city she represented. She is attested for the first time in an inscription of the Hurrian king Tishatal alongside various Hurrian deities.
Dadmiš Tadmiš		Ugarit	Uncertain	Šuzianna (Mesopotamian)	Dadmiš or Tadmiš (ddmš in the Ugaritic script, but syllabically ^{d}ta-ad-mi-iš) is attested in Hurrian ritual texts from Ugarit. Her origin is presently unknown. Her name might be derived from the Akkadian word dādmu ("dwellings"), which has also been linked with Dadmum, the Amorite name for the area of modern Aleppo. A different proposal connects her name with that of Tadmuštum, a Mesopotamian goddess associated with the underworld. It has been suggested that Dadmiš was either a healing goddess or an underworld deity associated with Resheph.
Damkina			Mesopotamian		Damkina was the wife of the Mesopotamian god Ea, incorporated into the Hurrian pantheon alongside her husband.
DINGIR.GE_{6}		Kizzuwatna, Šamuha	Hurrian (Kizzuwatnean)	possibly Ishtar (Mesopotamian)	DINGIR.GE_{6}, tentatively referred to as "Goddess of the Night" or formerly as the "Black Goddess" in modern scholarship, was a deity worshiped by Hurrians living in Kizzuwatna. She was associated with the nighttime and dreaming. She formed a dyad with Pinikir, and it is possible that like her she was associated with Ishtar.
Ebrimuša			Hurrian		Ebrimuša (also Ibrimuša; ebrmž in alphabetic Ugaritic texts) was a Hurrian god attested in an Old Assyrian document, in Hittite rituals of Hurrian origin, and in texts from Ugarit. His name means "king of justice." He was associated with Ḫepat, and in rituals also appears with her son Šarruma and sukkal Tiyabenti.
Hašuntarhi		Kizzuwatna			Hašuntarhi was a goddess sometimes listed alongside the dyad of Kubaba and Adamma in texts from Kizzuwatna.
Ḫabūrītum		Sikani	Syrian		Ḫabūrītum was a goddess representing the river Khabur. Based on the location of her presumed cult center and on the fact that she was introduced to Mesopotamia at the same time as many Hurrian goddesses, Tonia Sharlach concludes that either belonged to the Hurrian pantheon herself or at least was worshiped chiefly in a "Hurrian-dominated" area. Alfonso Archi proposes that she was analogous to Belet Nagar and possibly by extension also to Nabarbi.
Ḫešui		Šapinuwa	Hurrian	Zababa (Mesopotamian)	Ḫešui was a war god. The meaning of his name is unknown, While annelies Kammenhauber consideref him a Hurrian god in origin, according to Alfonso Archi this is presently impossible to tell with certainty. He belonged to the circle of deities associated with Teššub, and as such appears in kaluti (offering lists) connected with his cult.
Ḫupuštukar			Hurrian		Ḫupuštukar was the sukkal of Ḫešui. His name is derived from the Hurrian verb ḫub-, "to break." In one ritual text, he appears alongside the sukkals of other deities: Izzumi, Undurumma, Tenu, Lipparuma and Mukišanu.
Impaluri			Hurrian		Impaluri was the sukkal of the sea god (Kiaše). Volkert Haas notes that the suffix -luri appears not only in his name, but also in these of other deities, as well some mountain and stone names.
Iršappa		Hattusa, Šamuha	Syrian	Resheph (Syrian)	Iršappa (or Aršappa; eršp in the alphabetic Ugaritic script) was a god from the circle of Teššub. He was associated with markets, and in Hittite texts he was referred to as damkarassi, a Sumerian loanword meaning "of commerce." He was derived from the Syrian god Resheph, who was himself associated with the marketplace in Emar.
Irširra			Hurrian		Irširra were a group of Hurrian deities who might have been the goddesses of nursing and midwifery. In the Song of Ullikummi the eponymous rock creature is placed on the primordial giant Ullikummi's right shoulder by them, as ordered by Kumarbi.
Iškalli			Possibly Mesopotamian		Iškalli was a sparsely attested deity from the court of Ḫepat, usually paired with Uršui. She is described as the "witness of the goddess." The name might be derived from Akkadian ešgallu, "great temple."
^{d}IŠTAR deities Ḫumella, Akkupaweniwe, Tupukilḫe, Putaḫḫe, Allaiwašwe, bēlat dūri		Nuzi, Ulamme	Uncertain		In addition to Šauška, administrative documents from Nuzi attest the worship of other goddesses referred to with the logogram ^{d}IŠTAR (or rather with it shortened form ^{d}U_{4}), identified by the epithets Ḫumella, Akkupaweniwe, Tupukilḫe, Putaḫḫe, Allaiwašwe, and bēlat dūri. It is agreed most of these epithets are either etymologically Hurrian or at least Hurrianised, but their meanings remain unknown. An exception is bēlat dūri, which is Akkadian in origin and means “lady of the city walls.” In Ulamme, another city located in the kingdom of Arraphe, ^{d}IŠTAR Ḫumella was closely associated with Nergal.
Izzummi			Mesopotamian		Izzummi is the Hurrian spelling of the name of Isimud (Ušmu), the sukkal (attendant deity) of Ea, who was incorporated into Hurrian pantheon alongside his master.
Karḫuḫi		Carchemish	Hurrian		Karḫuḫi (or Karhuha) was a god worshiped in Carchemish, first attested in the fifteenth century BCE. He was associated with Kubaba. It is possible that the logogram ^{d}LAMMA, which designates one of the adversaries of Teššub in the Kumarbi Cycle, refers to him. While a connection between him and the Anatolian god Kurunta is commonly proposed, it cannot be conclusively proved, and his character is regarded as uncertain.
^{d}KASKAL.KUR.RA			Syrian		^{d}KASKAL.KUR.RA is one of the deities listed in the treaty between Šuppiluliuma I and Šattiwaza. This logogram has multiple possible readings, including the deified version of the Balikh River. The notion that a deified watercourse is meant in this document is tentatively supported by Alfonso Archi.
Kiaše		Ugarit	Hurrian	Yam (Ugaritic)	The name Kiaše means "sea" in Hurrian. The god is therefore sometimes simply referred to as "the Sea" or "the Sea God" in modern publications. He is mentioned in texts from Ugarit and Hattusa and in a hymn to Teššub from Halab. In myths about Kumarbi, he is one of his allies.
Kubaba		Carchemish, Alalakh	Syrian		Hurrian texts provide little information about Kubaba's character. According to Alfonso Archi, she was regarded as the goddess of lawsuits. She belonged to the circle of Ḫepat and was closely associated with Adamma. She should not be confused with the Sumerian queen Kubaba (Kug-Bau), whose name is theophoric and invokes the tutelary goddess of Lagash, Bau. The exact linguistic origin of Kubaba's name is unknown. Kubaba is also not etymologically related with the Phrygian goddess Cybele attested in later time periods.
Kunzišalli					Kunzišalli was one of the two daughters of Ḫepat and Teššub.
Kurri		Kizzuwatna	possibly Syrian (Eblaite)	possibly Kura (Eblaite)	Kurri was a god who was worshiped in the temple of Allani during the hišuwa festival. It has been proposed that he is the same deity as the Eblaite god Kura, whose worshiped otherwise ceased with the first destruction of Ebla, but it is impossible to establish this with certainty due to lack of information about the functions of either deity.
Kurwe		Azuhinnu	Hurrian		Kurwe was most likely the city god of Azuhinnu. He precedes Kumurwe (Kumarbi) in known offering lists. It has been proposed that he was the same god as Kurri from Kizzuwatna, though this is uncertain and the latter might also be connected with Eblaite Kura instead. It is possible that he continued to be invoked in theophoric names from Azuhinnu in the Neo-Assyrian period.
Lelluri		Haššum, Kummanni	Hurrian	Ninmena (Mesopotamian)	Lelluri was a Hurrian mountain goddess, a "lady of the mountains." She has been described as a deity "associated with Hurrian identity." She had a temple in Kummanni in Kizzuwatna, where she was worshiped alongside Manuzi.
Lipparuma			Hurrian	Bunene (Mesopotamian)	Lipparuma or Lipparu was the sukkal of the sun god, Šimige. He was regarded as analogous to Mesopotamian Bunene, and the latter in one case appears as a courtier of Šimige, with his name transcribed as ^{d}Wu-u-un-ni-nu-wa-an.
Maliya		Kizzuwatna	Anatolian		Maliya was a goddess of Anatolian origin, well known from Hittite documents. She was associated with gardens and could be called the "mother of wine and grain." She was originally associated with Kanesh. She was worshiped by Hurrians in Kizzuwatna, where she was associated with a group of deities of Hurrian origin referred to as Kuzzina-Kuzpazena. She appears alongside Hurrian deities such as Išḫara, Allani and Nupatik in documents pertaining to the hišuwa festival. She was also commonly worshiped by Luwians. Her cult survived in the first millennium BCE, and bilingual texts from Lycia attest an association between her and Greek Athena Polias.
Manuzi		Kummani			Manuzi was a mountain god regarded as the husband of Lelluri. He was associated with a mythical eagle, Eribuški, whose name has Hurrian origin. Volkert Haas noted the association of deified mountains with eagles is already attested in the case of the Eblaite Adarwan in the third millennium BCE. Manuzi could also be identified as a form of Teššub, and as such could be referred to as "Teššub Manuzi."
Milkunni		Ugarit	Hurrian/Ugaritic	Tišpak (Mesopotamian)	Milkunni was most likely a god associated with the underworld. His name is a combination of the name of an Ugaritic deity, Milku (mlk in the alphabetic texts), and the Hurrian suffix -nni.
Mitanni dynastic deities Mitra-ššil, (W)aruna-ššil, Indra and Našattiyana			Indo-European		The attested Mitanni deities of Indo-European origin include Indra, Mitra, Varuna and the Nasatya twins, all of whom only appear in a single treaty between Šuppiluliuma I and Šattiwaza, where they act as tutelary deities of the latter king. The Hurrianised spellings of their names are Mitra-ššil, (W)aruna-ššil, Indra and Našattiyana. They most likely were only worshiped by the nobility or the ruling dynasty of this kingdom.
Mukišānu			Hurrian or Syrian		Mukišānu was the sukkal (attendant deity) of Kumarbi. His name was derived from Mukiš, a geographic name designating the area around the city of Alalakh, where a large percentage of the population spoke Hurrian. Some researchers, such as Volkert Haas, nonetheless assume his origin was Syrian rather than Hurrian.
Mušītu		Emar	Syrian or Hurrian		The goddess Mušītu (^{d}mu-ši-tu_{4}, ^{d}mu-ši-ti), "night," was worshiped in Emar. According to Gary Beckman, her name most likely originates in a West Semitic language, but Alfonso Archi notes it is possible she was a misunderstanding of the Hurrian theonym Mušuni. In a ritual text found in Emar, but presumed to be of Anatolian provenance, she appears as a member of a group of Hurrian deities, consisting of Teššub, his bulls, the mountain gods Hazzi and Namni, Allani, "Madi" ("wisdom," an epithet of Ea in Hurrian texts), Nergal (according to Archi in this context possibly a logogram representing the name of another deity) and an unidentified heptad. She is also attested as one of the deities venerated in the local zukru festival, in which she appears in association with Saggar.
Mušuni			Hurrian		Mušuni was a goddess who formed a dyad with Ḫepat. Her name means "she of justice." It has been proposed that she was an underworld goddess, and in one case she appears in a ritual alongside Allani and Išḫara.
Namni and Ḫazzi		possibly Halab	Syrian		Namni and Ḫazzi were a pair of mountain gods who belonged to the retinue of Teššub. Ḫazzi corresponded to Jebel Aqra, in the Bronze Age known as Saphon, but it is presently unknown what mountain was represented by Namni. Fragment of a myth appears to indicate that they were believed to be former enemies of Teššub, who fought him with the same weapon he earlier used in his battle against the sea god.
Namrazunna			Hurrian/Mesopotamian		Namrazunna was a goddess from the entourage of Šauška. While she is attested in Hurrian and Hittite sources from Anatolia, her name is derived from Akkadian namru, "shining," and Zunna, a Hurrianized spelling of the name of the Mesopotamian moon god Suen, also attested in Hurrian text in transcription of the name of king Naram-Sin of Akkad. Volkert Haas proposed translating Namrazunna's name as "moonlight." Ilse Wegener instead suggests "the moon (god) shines for me." In ritual texts she could be grouped with other servants of Šauška, namely Ninatta, Kulitta and Šintal-irti.
Naya			Hurrian		Naya is a deity known from Hurrian theophoric names.
Nikkal		Ugarit	Mesopotamian	Ningal (Mesopotamian)	Nikkal was a Hurrian derivative of the Sumerian Ningal. In texts from Ugarit she appears both with Hurrian Kušuḫ and local Yarikh. In kaluti of Ḫepat she is attested alongside Umbu, which lead to the theory that Umbu was not a name of a moon deity but rather an epithet of Nikkal analogous to Ugaritic Nikkal-wa-Ib, though according to Mauro Giorgieri this is not plausible.
Ninatta and Kulitta		Hattusa, Ugarit	Possibly Anatolian (Kulitta), possibly Amorite (Ninatta)		Ninatta and Kulitta were handmaidens of Šauška. Their only Bronze Age attestations come from western Hurrian sources from Ugarit and Hattusa, though in later periods they are also attested in the entourages of Ishtar of Arbela, Ishtar of Assur, and Assyrian Ishtar of Nineveh. The origins of their names are unknown, though it has been proposed that Kulitta's name might have Anatolian origin and that Ninatta's might be derived from the place name Ninêt (Ni-ne-et^{ki}) or Nenit (Ne-en-it^{ki}) known from documents from Mari and Tell al-Rimah, which might be an Amorite spelling of Nineveh. In ritual texts they could be grouped with other deities from Šauška's entourage, namely Namrazunna and Šintal-irti.
Pairra			Hurrian	Sebitti	Pairra were a group of Hurrian gods whose name can be translated as "they who built." The singular form of the name is Pairi. According to a ritual text pertaining to the worship of Teššub and Ḫepat, the Pairra could appear as both auspicious figures and as malign demons. It has been proposed that in Hittite texts the logogram used to designate the Sebitti in Mesopotamia should be read as "Pairra." A formal equivalence between these two groups of deities is attested in a god list from Emar.
Partaḫi		Šuda			Partaḫi (also romanized as Pardahi) belonged to Hurrian pantheon of Mitanni, and appears as the deity of Šuda in the treaty between Šattiwaza with Šuppiluliuma I between a number of hypostases of Teššub from specific locations and Nabarbi.
Pentikalli		Halab, Samuha, Hattarina, Nuzi	Syrian or Mesopotamian	Ninegal (Mesopotamian)	Pentikalli was the Hurrian form of the name Belet Ekalli or Ninegal. In Hurrian texts, she is designated as a concubine of Teššub, and was assimilated with Pithanu, described as a goddess who sits on Teššub's throne in a ritual text.
Pinikir Pirengir		Šamuha	Elamite	Ishtar, Ninsianna (Mesopotamian)	Pinikir was a goddess of Elamite origin worshiped by the western Hurrians. It is possible that she was a divine representation of the planet Venus. She was referred to with epithets such as "Lady of the Lands," "Lady of Gods and Kings," "Queen of Heaven" and "Elamite goddess." She has been characterized as a "cosmopolitan deity" due to being worshiped in various locations all across the Ancient Near East, from modern Turkey to Iran. Pinikir's gender in Hurrian texts is not entirely consistent and in some offering lists he is counted among the male deities.
Pišaišapḫi		Alalakh	Hurrian		Pišaišapḫi (pḏḏpẖ in the alphabetic Ugaritic script) was a mountain god whose name is an adjective, "(he) of the mount Pišaiša." The corresponding landmark was most likely located close to the Mediterranean coast. Sometimes in offering lists he forms a dyad with another deified mountain, Hatni, in which case he appears second. However, unlike him Hatni is never mentioned on his own. He is attested alongside other mountains in oath formulas as well. He appears in a myth about Šauška, in which he promises to tell her the story of rebellion of the mountain gods against Teššub in exchange for being forgiven for own misdeeds.
Saggar		Emar, Kurda, Tell al-Rimah, Kizzuwatna	Syrian		Saggar was one of the gods incorporated into Hurrian religion who were originally worshiped in Ebla, but did not retain their former prominence after the fall of this city. His name could be written logographically as ^{d}ḪAR. He was a divine representation of the Sinjar Mountains, but seemingly also a lunar deity. He was also closely associated with Išḫara.
Samnuha Šamanminuḫi		Šadikanni, Taite	Hurrian		Samnuha (also spelled Samanuha) was the tutelary god of Šadikanni (modern Tell 'Ağağa). Šamanminuḫi, a god known from a treaty of Šattiwaza, is likely the same deity. He continued to be invoked in theophoric names as late as in the Achaemenid period. He is also attested as one of the three Hurrian deities from Taite in the Neo-Assyrian Tākultu ritual, the other two being Kumarbi and Nabarbi.
Sarie		Apenaš			Sarie was a god whose temple was located in Apenaš in the kingdom of Arrapḫa.
Sumuqan		Gurta	Mesopotamian		Sumuqan was a god associated with wild animals, herding and wool. He was already worshiped over a wide area in the third millennium, as attested in documents from Ebla, Nabada, Mari and various cities in Mesopotamia. He appears as the deity of Gurta in the treaty between Šattiwaza with Šuppiluliuma I.
Šaluš Pidenḫi		Bitin	Syrian		Šaluš (Šalaš) was a Syrian goddess who was originally the wife of Dagan. Due to syncretism between him and Kumarbi she came to also be viewed as the wife of the latter in Hurrian tradition. However, she does not appear in this role in any Hurrian myths. In Hurrian sources she could be referred to as Pidenḫi, in reference to her cult center Piten, also known as Bitin.
Šarrēna			Various		Šarrēna was a term collectively applied to deified kings in Hurrian culture. Lists of them known from rituals include historical Hurrian kings (Atal-Shen of Urkesh and Nawar), members of the Akkadian Sargonic dynasty (Sargon, Naram-Sin, Manishtushu and Shar-Kali-Sharri), kings of various distant locations (Autalumma of Elam, Immashku of Lullubi, Kiklip-Atal of Tukrish) and mythical figures (Ḫedammu and Silver known from the cycle of Kumarbi). Šarrēna and its singular form šarri were not the same as the terms used in royal titulature of Hurrian rulers, ewri and endan.
Šarruma		Kizzuwatna, Halab,	Anatolian, Syrian or Hurrian		Šarruma was the son of Teššub and Ḫepat. He was sometimes referred to as a "calf," possibly indicating that he could be depicted in theriomorphic form. He was also associated with mountains. Due to the similarity of his name to the Akkadian word šarru, "king," his name could be written as ^{d}LUGAL-da, LUGAL being a Sumerian logogram of analogous meaning.
Šayu			Hurrian		Šayu (Šaju) is an element attested in feminine personal names from Nuzi, identified as a possible name of a goddess by Gernot Wilhelm and Thomas Richter.
Šeri and Ḫurri			Hurrian		Šeri and Ḫurri were a pair of bulls believed to pull Teššub's chariot. While Šeri is occasionally attested on his own and he had a distinct role as a mediator between worshipers and Teššub, nothing is known about Ḫurri's characteristics and in known texts he only appears paired with the other bull. In the Song of Ullikummi, Tilla replaces the latter of the two bull gods.
Šinan-tatukarni			Hurrian		Šinan-tatukarni ("twofold at [?] love") was a deity associated with Šauška, only known from a single document which lists four figures who bring bad luck, the other three being Ari, Halzari and Taruwi.
Šintal-irti			Hurrian		Šintal-irti ("seven-breasted") was a deity associated with Šauška. In ritual texts she could be grouped with other deities from her entourage, namely Ninatta, Kulitta and Namrazunna. Like them, she was believed to be a bringer of good luck. She is only attested in a single offering list, where her name is written without a divine determinative.
Šintal-wuri			Hurrian		Šintal-wuri ("seven-eyed") was a deity associated with Šauška. She appears alongside Šintal-irti in an offering list.
Šuruḫḫe		Halab	Hurrian		Šuruḫḫe is one of the deities mentioned in the treaty between Šattiwaza with Šuppiluliuma I, after Partaḫi and Nabarbi. The same deity is also attested in a list of offerings to Teššub and Ḫepat of Halab. The name is most likely Hurrian in origin and according to Gernot Wilhelm should be interpreted as a nisba derived from the place name Šuri.
Šuwala		Mardaman	Hurrian		Šuwala (ṯwl in alphabetic Ugaritic texts) was an underworld goddess who served as the tutelary deity of Mardaman, a Hurrian city in the north of modern Iraq. She belonged to the circle of Ḫepat and could be associated with Allani, but she is best attested in a dyad with Nabarbi. She is attested from various locations across the ancient Near East: Nuzi in the kingdom of Arrapḫa, Ur in southern Mesopotamia, Hattusa in Anatolia, and Alalakh, Ugarit and Emar in Syria. In the last of these cities she was associated with Ugur.
Takitu		Ugarit	possibly Syrian		Takitu (dqt in the Ugaritic alphabetic script; multiple spellings alternating between ta and tu and da and du are attested from Hurro-Hittite sources) was the sukkal of Ḫepat. Her name is possibly derived from the Semitic root dqq, "small." In myths she travels to various locations on behalf of her mistress.
Tapšuwari			Hurrian		Tapšuwari is a deity known from a fragment of the Hurrian version of Song of Ullikummi, and from another literary fragment, both of which mention the sun and moon gods. Meindert Dijkstra proposed that was the sukkal of Kušuḫ, while Volkert Haas considered him a courtier of Kumarbi.
Tašmišu		Kizzuwatna, especially Šapinuwa	Hurrian	Šuwaliyat (Hittite)	Tašmišu was a god regarded as the brother and sukkal of Teššub and husband of Nabarbi. It is assumed that his name is derived from the word tašmi, which might mean "strong." He appears in ritual texts from Kizzuwatna, especially those connected to the worship of Teššub in Šapinuwa.
Tenu		Possibly Halab	Syrian or Hurrian		In a number of ritual texts, Tenu is listed as the sukkal of Teššub in place of Tašmišu. Daniel Schwemer proposes that this is an indication he originally belonged to the pantheon of Aleppo (Halab). Gary Beckman also assumes he was a Syrian deity in origin. However, Alfonso Archi considers him to simply be a Hurrian deity.
Tirwi		Azuhinnu			Tirwi was a god worshiped in Azuhinnu in the kingdom of Arrapḫa. It is assumed that he was a male deity. He appears in theophoric names, such as Akit-Tirwi.
Tiyabenti		Kizzuwatna	Hurrian		Tiyabenti was a deity of unclear gender who could serve as Ḫepat's sukkal. The name can be translated "he who speaks favorably" or "she who speaks favorably." In many sources, Takitu is identified as Ḫepat's sukkal, but she can appear alongside Tiyabenti in ritual texts, and it is unlikely that one of them was merely an epithet of the other.
Ugur Šaumatar		Arrapḫa, Emar	Mesopotamian		Ugur was originally the sukkal of Nergal, the Mesopotamian god of war of death. In Mesopotamian sources his name eventually became a logographic representation of Nergal's. The Hurrians viewed him as a god of war and as an underworld deity. He is attested in theophoric names from Nuzi. Under the epithet Šaum(m)atar he could be considered a member of a triad whose two other members were Nupatik and Aštabi. In Emar he appears in ritual texts alongside Šuwala.
Undurumma					Undurumma was the sukkal of Šauška, though only a single attestation of this deity is known. It is uncertain if Unudurupa ( or Unduruwa), who appears in another document in association with Allani, should be considered identical with Undurumma.
Uršui		possibly Uršu	Hurrian		Uršui (or Uršue) was a goddess included in the circle of either Ḫepat or Šauška. She was always paired with Iškalli, though the latter sporadically occurs alone. The name might be derived from the name of the city Uršu(m), likely located in the proximity of modern Gaziantep. Alfonso Archi proposes that the joint name Uršui-Iškalli could initially mean "the great temple of the city of Uršu." In the past a different etymology of Uršui's name has been proposed by Emmanuel Laroche, who explained it as a combination of the Hurrian words ur-, "to be available" and šui, "all." It has also been proposed that Uršui was not a separate goddess but merely an epithet of Iškalli.
Zarwan		Apenaš, Azuhinnu			Zarwan was a god worshiped in Apenaš and Azuhinnu in the kingdom of Arrapḫa. It is assumed that he was a male deity. He is attested in theophoric names such as Itḫiz-Zarwa.

== Primordial beings and mythical antagonists ==
Name	Image	Origin	Details
Ammatina Enna		Various	Ammatina Enna, whose name can be translated as "former gods" or "primordial gods," were a special type of Hurrian deities. Typically twelve of them were listed at a time. The standard group included Nara, Napšara, Minki, Tuḫuši, Ammunki, Ammizzadu, Alalu, Anu, Antu, Apantu, Enlil and Ninlil. Additional names attested in various source include Eltara, Ta(i)štara, Muntara, Mutmuntara, Aduntarri, Zulki and Irpitiga. Some of these deities were Mesopotamian in origin (for example Anu, Enlil and their spouses), while others have names which cannot be presently classified and possibly originate in Syria.
Alalu		Mesopotamian	Alalu was a primordial deity of Mesopotamian origin. He is mentioned in the proem of the first part of the Kumarbi Cycle according to which he was originally the king of the gods but later was dethroned by his cupbearer Anu and had to flee to the underworld. While it is sometimes assumed in scholarship that he was the father of Anu and grandfather of Kumarbi, most likely two separate dynasties of gods are described in the passage in mention, and Alalu and Anu were not regarded as father and son in Hurrian tradition. Another myth directly refers to Kumarbi as his son. A Mesopotamian text equates him with another primordial deity, Enmesharra.
Anu		Mesopotamian	The Mesopotamian god Anu commonly appears in Hurrian enumerations of primordial deities. He is also attested in the offering lists of the circle of Teššub from Šapinuwa. In the Song of Kumarbi, he is one of the three former kings of gods, but his origin is not explained. He initially acts as Alalu's cupbearer, but after nine years dethrones him. After the same period of time, his own cupbearer Kumarbi dethrones him too and bits off his genitals while he tries to flee to heaven. Teššub, the weather god, is his son.
Silver Ušḫune		Hurrian	Silver was the son of Kumarbi and a mortal woman. His name was written without the divine determinative, and he was not worshiped as a deity. In the myth Song of Silver he most likely temporarily became the king of the gods and dragged the Sun and the Moon down from heaven.
Ḫedammu Ḫidam			Ḫedammu was a sea monster who was the son of Kumarbi and Šertapšuruḫi. He is described as destructive and voracious. Most likely in the end of the corresponding myth, known as Song of Ḫedammu, he was defeated by Šauška.
Šertapšuruḫi		Hurrian	Šertapšuruḫi was the daughter of the sea god Kiaše. She is mentioned in the myth Song of Hedammu. It is possible that her name means "belonging to Šertapšuri" (a term of unknown meaning).
Ullikummi		Hurrian	Ullikummi was a stone giant created by Kumarbi to defeat Teššub. His name means "Destroy Kumme!" It has been proposed that a monster depicted on the golden bowl of Hasanlu who has a human head but whose lower body is a mountain might be Ullikummi, and that the rest of the sculpted figures can be interpreted other characters and events from the same myth.
Upelluri		Hurrian	Upelluri was a giant believed to bear the world on his back. In the Song of Ullikummi, the eponymous monster is placed on his shoulder by Kumarbi's servants to let him grow away from the sight of Teššub and his allies.
Enlil		Mesopotamian	Enlil, the head of the Mesopotamian pantheon, commonly appears in Hurrian enumerations of primordial deities. In Hurrian tradition he was regarded as the father of Išḫara. Enlil and Kumarbi could be equated with each other in theological texts due to sharing the role of father of gods in their respective pantheons. At the same time, in Hurrian myths they are treated as two different figures. For example, in the Song of Kumarbi Enlil is among the deities invited to listen to the story of Kumarbi, while in the Song of Ullikummi he decries the latter god's intrigue as evil.
Eltara		Possibly Ugaritic	Eltara was one of the deities who could be counted among the Ammatina Enna. In this context he was paired with the deity Ta(i)štara. His name is assumed to be a combination of the name of the Ugaritic god El and the suffix -tara. El himself appears in Hurrian offering lists from Ugarit. A poorly preserved myth describes a period during which Eltara was the king of the gods, and additionally alludes to a conflict involving the mountains.
Eni attanni		Hurrian/Ugaritic	The concept of eni attanni, the "god father", developed among Hurrians living in Ugarit as an equivalent of the local deity Ilib, and functioned as a representation of a "generic ancestor of the gods".
Earth and Heaven		Hurrian	The Hurrian term referring to the deified Earth and Heaven was eše hawurni. The worship of this concept is attested in sources from all areas inhabited by the Hurrians, similar to the major deities such as Teššub, but there is no indication that Earth and Heaven were regarded as personified deities themselves.

== Deities assumed to have Hurrian origin ==
Name	Image	Pantheon	Details
Hahharnum and Hayyashum		Mesopotamian	Hahharnum (Ḫamurnu) and Hayyashum were the Mesopotamian reflection of the Hurrian deified Heaven and Earth. They appear as a pair of primordial deities in a small number of texts, for example in the myth Theogony of Dunnu. Hahharnum is also attested alone in the god list Anšar = Anum which equates him with Anu.
Ḫiriḫibi		Ugaritic	Ḫiriḫibi (Ḫrḫb) is a god only known from the Ugaritic myth Marriage of Nikkal and Yarikh. He is assumed to have Hurrian origin, which is also proposed for the myth itself. It is possible that his name means "he of the mountain Ḫiriḫ(i)," and that it ends with suffix -bi (Ḫiriḫ(i)bi), similar to these of Hurrian deities Kumarbi and Nabarbi.
Kašku		Hattic	It has been suggested that the presumed name of the Hattic moon god Kašku might be the evidence of early contact between the speakers of Hattic and Hurrian, as it resembles the name of Kušuḫ. However, it has been recently proposed that the correct reading of the name is Kab, rather than Kašku.
Maḏḏara		Ugaritic	It has been proposed that the name of the deity Maḏḏara, who is only attested Ugaritic offering lists, might have Hurrian origin. This theory is based on the similarity between the syllabic writing of the name, ^{d}ma-za-ra, and the Hurrian word maziri, "help." This proposal is not universally accepted.
Pidar		Ugaritic	According to Manfred Krebernik, it is possible that the name of Pidar, an Ugaritic god associated with Baal, was derived from the Hurrian word pedari, "bull." It is also possible his name is connected with that of the goddess Pidray from the same pantheon.
^{d}Su-ra-su-gu-WA		Ugaritic	The name of the Ugaritic deity ^{d}Su-ra-su-gu-WA (reading of the final sign uncertain), only known from a single offering list, might be Hurrian in origin.
Šala		Mesopotamian	The name of Šala, a goddess who was the wife of the Mesopotamian weather god Adad, is assumed to be derived from the Hurrian word šāla, "daughter." She might also be attested in the treaty between Šuppiluliuma I and Šattiwaza, but according to Daniel Schwemer it is possible that this is a scribal mistake and the goddess meant there is instead Šalaš.
Šaraššiya		Ugaritic	Šaraššiya is only known from offering lists from Ugarit. His name is most likely derived from Hurrian šarašše-, "kingship." In Hurro-Hittite texts an essive form of this word, šaraššiya, "for kingship," functioned as a designation of offerings. It is assumed that the god Šaraššiya was a divine personification of kingship.
Šiduri		Mesopotamian	Šiduri is the name assigned to an originally nameless divine alewife in the so-called "Standard Babylonian" version of the Epic of Gilgamesh. The etymology of her name is a matter of debate, but it is possible it was derived from the Hurrian word šiduri, "young woman." In Hurrian and Hittite translations of the Epic of Gilgamesh known from Hattusa, the alewife is named, Naḫmazulel or Naḫmizulen (an ordinary Hurrian given name), but she is described as a šiduri. Gary Beckman proposes that his was the origin of her name in the Standard Babylonian version.
Tišpak		Mesopotamian	While many researchers today favor the view that Tishpak, the city god of Eshnunna, had Elamite origin, the possibilities that he was either derived directly from Teššub or an Elamite reflection of him have also been proposed.
Umbidaki		Mesopotamian	Umbidaki was a god worshiped in the temple of Ishtar of Arbela in Neo-Assyrian times who might have been derived from Nupatik, possibly introduced to this city after a war which led to Assyrians acquiring a statue of him.
