= Barama (goddess) =

Eblaite goddess

- Tutelary goddess of Ebla and its kings
- Major cult center: Ebla
- Consort: Kura

Barama (Eblaite: ^{d}ba-ra-ma) was a goddess worshiped in the Syrian city of Ebla in the third millennium BCE as the wife of its tutelary god, Kura. She is not attested in any sources postdating the destruction of Ebla.

== Name ==
Alfonso Archi proposes that Barama's name should be understood as "full of color", and that it is derived from the Semitic root *brm. A possible cognate, barāmu, "to be multicolored", is attested in Akkadian. This proposal is also supported by Walther Sallaberger, who notes that it has been suggested that the name referred to her colorful clothes. As an alternative, Archi cconsiders it possible that her name belonged to a linguistic substrate, like these of other deities worshiped in Ebla, such as Kura, Hadabal, Išḫara, Adamma or Aštabi. He notes it is unusual for Barama's name to lack the feminine suffix -at, if it had its origin in a Semitic language.

== Character ==
Barama was the wife of Kura, the tutelary god of Ebla. She is relatively infrequently attested in Eblaite texts. Only five mentions come from offering lists, and about twenty from other administrative documents. However, it can be assumed that she nonetheless headed the local pantheon alongside her husband. The status of these two deities was reflected in their connection to the royal couple of the city. Similarly to Kura, but unlike another high-ranking Eblaite god, Hadabal, Barama is very rarely attested outside the city itself. She disappeared from history after its destruction.

== Worship ==
A priestess, pa_{4}-šeš(-mí), was responsible for the cult of both Barama and Kura. A holder of this office attested in multiple Eblaite documents bore the name Enna-Utu. Furthermore, functionaries belonging to the cult of Barama are alluded to in the text ARET 7.13, which deals with purchases of clothing for individuals involved in the worship of her and Adamma.

It is possible that two damâtum (a type of betyl-like boundary stone to which religious importance was assigned in Ebla), were dedicated jointly to Kura and Barama.

Barama does not appear in any known theophoric names. The name-giving customs at Ebla are assumed to largely reflect an older tradition that the pantheon of the city, and the most common theophoric elements are not personified deities, but the words damu and lim, representing the deified concepts of, respectively, kinship ties and clan organization.

=== The rite of royal ascension ===
Following the royal wedding of a new Eblaite king, a four day pilgrimage involving both Barama and Kura had to be undertaken. During preparations for it, the queen had to make an offering to a number of deities, including Barama, in the temple of Kura. The target of the journey was the nearby village Binaš (less commonly read as Nenaš), which was the location of a royal mausoleum. The statue of Barama traveled in its own cart, similar to that of Kura. During a ritual which took place in the mausoleum (é ma-dim, "house of the dead") both of the deities were believed to undergo ritual renewal. The process is described in a ritual text:

When the sun (god) rises, the invocation priests invoke and the lamentation priests intone the laments of when the birth goddess Nintu was angered. And those that it illuminates ask to be illuminated. And the birth goddess Nintu illuminates the new Kura, the new Barama, the new king, and the new queen.

According to Alfonso Archi, Nintu/^{d}TU should not be understood as the Mesopotamian goddess in this context, but rather as a logographic representation of the name of a hitherto unknown Eblaite goddess of similar character. He points out that similar use of this logogram is known from Mari. Other renewal rites seemingly did not involve goddesses, as none are attested for Išḫara, Ishtar or the spouses of Hadda (Halabatu) and Resheph (Adamma).

The ceremony was a royal ascension ritual, though despite direct statements confirming this in Eblaite texts, it appears that both Ishar-Damu and Irkab-Damu had already been rulers for multiple years when they undertook it during their respective reigns. It has been proposed that the royal couple was understood as the earthly manifestation of Kura and Barama in its context.
