= Kura (deity) =

Eblaite god

- Tutelary god of Ebla and its kings
- Major cult center: Ebla
- Consort: Barama

Kura was a god worshiped in Ebla (modern Tell Mardikh in Syria) in the third millennium BCE. He was the tutelary god of the city, as well as the head of the local pantheon. While his functions are difficult to ascertain, it is well attested that he was connected to the institution of kingship.

The etymology of his name is presently unknown, and it is commonly assumed that it belongs to an unknown linguistic substrate, similar to the names of some of the other Eblaite deities, such as Aštabi, Hadabal or Išḫara.

Kura's spouse was the goddess Barama, who like him was only worshiped in Ebla. After the destruction of the city both of them disappear from records. A number of proposals have been made regarding identification of deities attested from later periods with Kura, but most of them are not widely accepted.

== Name and origin ==
The oldest attestations of Kura come from administrative texts predating the destruction of Ebla by thirty five to forty years.

The name of the god is consistently spelled as ^{d}KU.RA, and it is agreed today that the syllabic reading is correct. Its etymology is not known. It is assumed it belonged to a linguistic substrate, similar to these of other Eblaite gods, including Adamma, Aštabi, Hadabal and Išḫara. The existence of a non-Semitic and non-Hurrian substrate language in ancient Syria has been first proposed by Igor M. Diakonoff, who in 1971 concluded that Išḫara and Kubaba were pre-Hurrian Syrian deities. This theory subsequently found support from other researchers, such as Volkert Haas, Alfonso Archi and Joan Goodnick Westenholz. Edward Lipiński instead proposes that the name is derived from a Sumerian term, kura_{x}, which he interprets as "millstone." However, as pointed out by Walther Sallaberger, the word in mention is only a speculative reconstruction, and its proposed meaning is "granary" rather than "millstone."

The theory that Kura was not an independent deity, but merely an epithet of the weather god Hadda, is regarded as implausible. Daniel Schwemer notes that the Eblaite texts do not point at any sort of close theological connection between these two gods.

== Character ==
It is agreed that Kura was the tutelary god of Ebla. In earlier sources, it was sometimes assumed that he was merely a major god in the local pantheon, or that the city had three tutelary deities, namely Kura, Hadda and the sun deity. He has been characterized as a local deity of prosperity. Next to Hadabal, he was the foremost god of the Eblaite pantheon. Walther Sallaberger argues that despite his position it is unlikely that Kura was envisioned as a senior, Enlil-like figure.

Kura's wife was the goddess Barama, like him only attested in Ebla. Both of them were closely connected to the royal family. They shared this function with Išḫara.

Alfonso Archi assumes that Kura's role as a god of oaths, known from Eblaite treaties, was an innate part of his character, possibly also outside Ebla. There is however no evidence for worship of Kura in other locations, as acknowledged by Archi himself, who admits that Kura's absence from a treaty between Ebla and Abarsal likely indicates he was absent from the pantheon of the latter city and other areas outside Ebla and its immediate surroundings. The sole exception is a single offering text from pre-Sargonic Mari.

Alfonso Archi considers the assumption that Kura was a warrior god implausible, noting that he never received weapons, especially maces, as offering, unlike other deities, including Ammarik, Hadad, Hadabal and Resheph. Walther Sallaberger disagrees with this theory, and points out that Kura was apparently associated with a whip in a single ritual character, which according to him might indicate that as a royal deity, he was also imagined as a warlike subjugator of enemies., similar to Mesopotamian Nergal or Ninurta.

Edward Lipińsk's theory, according to which Kura ("Baal Kura") was a god of the harvest and a dying god, is regarded as purely speculative and is not based on any primary sources.

== Worship ==
Kura is the god appearing most often in administrative texts from Ebla (130 mentions), with Hadabal being the only other deity appearing comparably often (105 mentions). He also received the most offerings out of all gods worshiped in Ebla, including the biggest amount of silver. There is also an attested instance of a large amount of gold (ten minas, corresponding to almost five kilograms) being donated to the temple of Kura by the king. Walther Sallaberger notes that in addition to showing the piety of the ruler, depositing precious metals in temples likely also had a practical dimensions, as they were an important element of the city's economy, and their funds could be used during emergencies. However, Kura did not receive the most animal offerings. At the same time, he received sacrificial animals more regularly than any other deity. He also received regular offerings of bread from the royal bakery, which is not attested for any other Eblaite deity. Sacrifices to him were particularly strongly associated with the eighth day of each month, but the reason behind this connection, and any possible symbolic importance of the day, are not known. An additional annual sacrifice consisted of two golden bracelets and a túg-NI.NI, most likely a type of robe or shawl, apparently worn by women, clergy and participants of royal weddings.

It is often assumed that two temples of Kura existed in Ebla, possibly to be identified with buildings labeled as the "Red Temple" and the "Temple of the Rock" during excavations, though no direct evidence allows precise identification yet. The temple was responsible for haruspicy on the ruler's behalf. In one case, the news about a queen giving birth to a male heir was announced from the terrace (or roof) of Kura's temple. Rituals to other deities could take place on the grounds of the temple of Kura, for example one text relates that a ceremony during which the queen dedicated eight small silver figures of mouflons to the sun deity was held within a sacred enclosure located next to it. Hadda, the weather god, could be honored in the temple of Kura too. In addition to temples, a gate of Kura is also attested in Eblaite texts, and it is likely that it was a part of the sacred precinct surrounding his temple rather than a city gate.

Most oaths of political significance were sworn in the temple of Kura, for example declarations of loyalty to the king from elite members of Eblaite society, or treaties with other states. According to Walther Sallaberger, an exception were cases where the other signatories were regional powers in their own right, namely Nagar or Mari, in which case the temple of Dagan of Tuttul was used instead. However, Alfonso Archi points out that in one case an envoy of Ikun-išar, the king of Mari, sealed a peace treaty with Ebla in the temple of Kura. A copy of that treaty, covered in silver, was deposited in the temple.

A pair of pa_{4}-šeš ("purification servants") served as the priests of Kura.

Kura appears in a large number of theophoric names from Ebla. One known example is Mikum-Kura ("What concerns you, Kura?"). Menu-Kura, whose name was seemingly a variant writing of Mikum-Kura, is attested as a gatekeeper during the period of vizier Ibbi-Zikir's activity. Alfonso Archi points out that deities whose names are assumed to belong to a linguistic substrate are otherwise absent from personal names. Next to Kura, the only other exception is Hadabal, though despite being commonly worshiped he is only attested in two names. Archi proposes that the name-giving customs at Ebla might therefore commonly reflect a tradition predating the contact between speakers of the Eblaite language and these of the substrate language.

There is no evidence that Kura was worshiped anywhere outside of Ebla, and he had no local hypostases. While possible further locations have been proposed, such as Armi or Silaḫa, no known documents directly state that Kura was worshiped in any of them, only that their rulers sent gifts to the temple of Kura. A single recently discovered exception is an offering list from pre-Sargonic Mari, in which Kura likely appears for political reasons. It has been argued that the presence of Kura, Belet Nagar and Šumugan reflected the dependence of polities associated with them, respectively Ebla, Nagar (Tell Brak) and Nabada (Tell Beydar), on Mari, attested in the earliest years of the Eblaite archives, during the reign of Irkab-Damu.

Like some of the other deities associated with Ebla, such as Barama and Hadabal, Kura ceased to be worshiped after the destruction of the city.

=== The annual renewal rite ===
Kura's statue had to be annually renewed with a new silver mask. Exactly one mina (around 470 grams) of this metal were used each time. It is assumed that the statue was wooden, and only certain parts of it were covered in sheets of metal. Eblaite administrative documents mention that some of the silver was at one point provided by Armi, a city assumed to be located north of Harran. However, there is no indication that any other city was ever invited to participate.

Based on this festival, as well as other examples of annual celebrations from Ebla, such as annual offering of bulls horns to Hadda or the renewal rite of Resheph, Alfonso Archi proposes that annual renewal of deities was a major element in Eblaite religion.

=== The rite of royal ascension ===
Following the royal wedding of a new Eblaite king, a four day pilgrimage involving both Barama and Kura had to be undertaken. During preparations for it, the queen had to make an offering to a number of deities in the temple of Kura, including the god himself and his spouse Barama. The target of the journey was the nearby village Binaš (less commonly read as Nenaš), which was the location of a royal mausoleum. The statue of Kura traveled in its own cart, as did that of his spouse Barama. During a ritual which took place in é ma-dim, "house of the dead" (the mausoleum in mention) both of the deities were believed to undergo ritual renewal. The process is described in a ritual text:

When the sun (god) rises, the invocation priests invoke and the lamentation priests intone the laments of when the birth goddess Nintu was angered. And those that it illuminates ask to be illuminated. And the birth goddess Nintu illuminates the new Kura, the new Barama, the new king, and the new queen.

According to Alfonso Archi, Nintu/^{d}TU should not be understood as the Mesopotamian goddess in this context, but rather as a stand in for an unknown Eblaite goddess of similar character. He points out that similar use of this logogram is known from Mari. Other renewal rites seemingly did not involve goddesses, as none are attested for Išḫara, Ishtar or the spouses of Hadda (Halabatu) and Resheph (Adamma).

The ceremony was a royal ascension ritual, though despite direct statements confirming this in Eblaite texts, it appears that both Ishar-Damu and Irkab-Damu had already been rulers for multiple years when they undertook it during their respective reigns. It has been proposed that the royal couple was understood as the earthly manifestation of Kura and Barama in its context.

== Possible attestations after the fall of Ebla ==
A problem commonly discussed in modern scholarship is Kura's disappearance from the records after the fall of Ebla, difficult to reconcile with his prominence in the religion of the city. A number of possible later attestations of Kura have been identified, but Walther Sallaberger notes that many of them are the product of faulty scholarship. For example, a number of researchers, including Stephanie Dalley, erroneously list personal names from Mari containing the logogram KUR (without a dingir sign preceding it) as referring to Kura. Similarly, K. Lawson Younger's interpretation of a line from a first millennium BCE Mesopotamian theological text, explaining the meaning of epithet kur-ra, "of the land," as a reference to Kura, is regarded as erroneous. Edward Lipiński refers to Kura as "Baal Kura" and argues that a deity known from Phoenician inscriptions, b’l kr, should be identified with him, even though other researchers favor an identification with Luwian weather god Tarhunt in his role of a protector of vineyards. No plausible explanation has been found for the element kr, with proposed interpretations including "pasture" or "furnace." Some proposals are rejected in modern publications due to relying on no historical or philological arguments, but merely on superficial similarity of names, for example identification of Kura with the demon qūlār known from a much later Jewish magical manuscript.

A god named Kura or Kurra (^{d}kur-a or ^{d}kur-ra) appears in neo-Assyrian theophoric names from Arzuhina (Azuhinnu), a city close to ancient Hurrian Arrapḫa (modern Kirkuk), for example the governor of the area bore the name Abdi-Kurra ("servant of Kurra"). Based on the location of this settlement it is possible that the neo-Assyrian Kurra was a late form of Hurrian Kurwe (^{d}ku-u-ur-we, ^{d}gu-u-ur-we), a god who appears in earlier offering lists from Nuzi, preceding Kumurwe (Kumarbi), and who might have been Azuhinnu's tutelary deity.

A deity named Kurri (^{d}ku-ur-ri) appears in texts pertaining to the hišuwa festival celebrated in Kizzuwatna, which was influenced by the beliefs of inhabitants of northern Syria. Kurri received offerings in the temple of the Hurrian underworld goddess Allani after the part of the celebration which took part in the temple of Išḫara, whose worship by the Hurrians was in part a continuation of Eblaite traditions. Alfonso Archi considers Kurri to be the only plausible instance of survival of Kura.

Walter Sallaberger notes that it cannot be ruled out that Kurri and Kurwe are the same god as both belong to the Hurrian milieu, but due to lack of precise information about the character of both of these deities and Kura himself, correspondence between them cannot be established with certainty.
