= Nupatik =

Hurro-Hittite god

- God of uncertain character
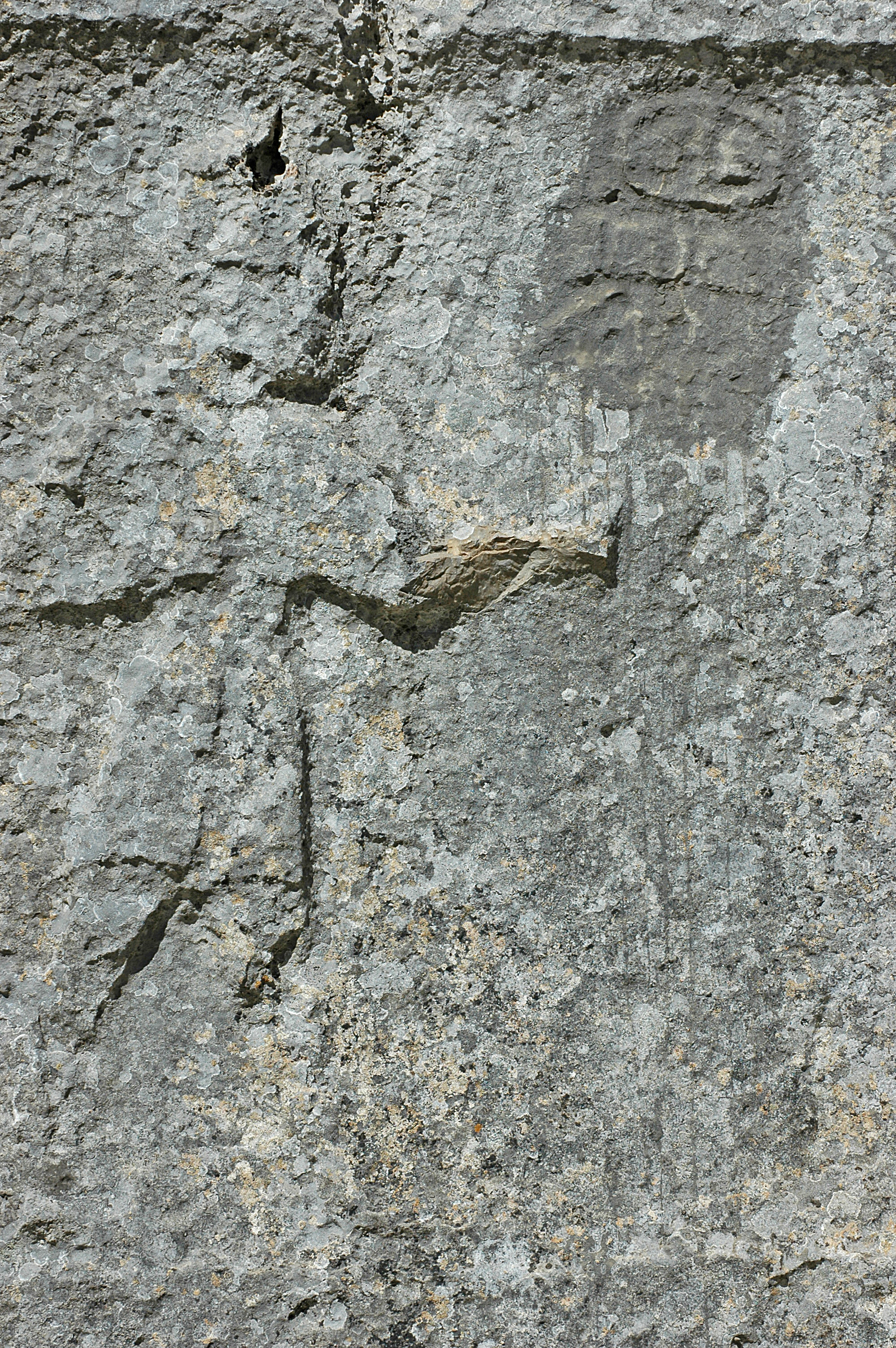
- A possible depiction Nupatik on the Yazılıkaya procession relief
- Other names: Lubadag, Nubadig, Nubandag
- Major cult center: Urkesh, Carchemish

Nupatik, in early sources known as Lubadag, was a Hurrian god of uncertain character. He is attested in the earliest inscriptions from Urkesh, as well as in texts from other Hurrian settlements and Ugarit. He was also incorporated into Hittite religion. A similarly named deity continued to be venerated in Arbela as late as in the Neo-Assyrian period.

== Name ==
Nupatik's name is attested for the first time in an inscription of the Hurrian king Tish-atal of Urkesh, where it is spelled syllabically as ^{d}lu-ba-da-ga, rather than logographically, like these of other Hurrian deities mentioned in the same text. Numerous spellings of this theonym are known, for example ^{d}nu-pa-ti-ik, ^{d}lu-pa-ki-ta, ^{d}nu-ú-pa-ti-ga, ^{d}nu-pa-da-ak, and more. He is also present in Hurrian texts from Ugarit, where his name is spelled in the local alphabetic script as nbdg (𐎐𐎁𐎄𐎂). This variant of the name can be vocalized as Nubadig.

Both the meaning and origin of Nupatik's name are unknown. While references to Hurrian deities in Mesopotamian lexical lists are rare, a late copy of an explanatory Babylonian god list, BM 40747, preserves a reference to Nupatik under the variant name Nupadak, and provides this theonym with an invented Sumerian etymology, ^{d}nu-pa-da-ak = šá la in-nam-mar (obverse, line 5), "who cannot be seen", with nu interpreted as negation, ak as a genitive ending, and pad as a verbal root. Wilfred G. Lambert remarked that apparently the Mesopotamian compilers of the list were equally clueless about the nature of Nupatik and the origin of his name as modern researchers, and he suggested that the invented etymology might have reflected this, as it is possible it was supposed to designate him as unknown, as opposed to invisible, which was enabled by the nuance involved in use of the word pad and its Akkadian equivalents.

== Character and attributes ==
Nupatik's character, functions and genealogy are unknown. He is also absent from known Hurrian myths. According to hittitologist Piotr Taracha, Nupatik was regarded as a member of the category of Anatolian tutelary gods in Hurro-Hittite contexts. It is accepted that the logogram ^{d}LAMMA might refer to him in some cases. (Note: However, the deity ^{d}LAMMA known from one of the myths belonging to the Kumarbi Cycle is likely Karḫuḫi, a tutelary god from Carchemish.)

According to a Hittite ritual text the items offered to him were a bow, arrows and a quiver. Gianni Marchesi and Nicolò Marchetti propose that he was a warrior god based on this evidence. This view is also supported by Volkert Haas, who notes that he belonged to a triad of gods which also included Ugur (under the epithet Šaummatar) and Aštabi, who were known for their warlike character. Suggestions that Nupatik can be identified with the Mesopotamian war god Zababa can be found in literature, but according to Gernot Wilhelm this assumption is incorrect, and the latter corresponded to Ḫešui instead in the Hurrian pantheon. Jean-Marie Durand proposed that "Nubandag" (Nupatik) worshiped in Carchemish according to texts from Mari is to be identified with Nergal, but Marchesi and Marchetti reject this theory due to Nupatik and Nergal being distinct deities in Hurrian sources, such as an inscription of Tish-atal.

Manfred Krebernik notes that in one of the Hurrian ritual texts from Ugarit (CAT 1.125) Nupatik appears to play the role of psychopomp, a deity leading the dead to the afterlife.

== Worship ==
Nupatik was one of the "pan-Hurrian" gods, and as such was worshiped by various Hurrian communities all across the ancient Near East, similarly to Teshub, Šauška or Kumarbi, He was already venerated in Urkesh in the third millennium BCE under the name Lubadag. The local king (endan) Tish-atal mentions him in a curse formula in an inscription commemorating the erection of a temple of Nergal, alongside Belet Nagar and Hurrian deities such as Šimige. In Carchemish in the Middle Bronze Age he was known as Nubandag, and was one of the most commonly worshiped deities of the city, alongside Nergal and Kubaba. A letter from the merchant Ishtaran-Nasir to king Zimri-Lim of Mari mentions that at one point, a festival of Nubandag took priority over mourning the death of king Aplahanda, and the latter event were only revealed to his subjects and foreigners present in the city after it ended.

Ugaritic texts indicate that Nupatik was also one of the Hurrian deities worshiped in the city of Ugarit. In the text RS 24.254, which deals with a ritual focused mostly on Hurrian figures, though with local El and Anat also mentioned, he is the last of the gods listed in an instruction prescribing repeating a cycle of sacrifices seven times. In RS 24.261, a ritual combining Hurrian and Ugaritic elements and dedicated to Šauška and Ashtart, he is listed among recipients of offerings after the pair Ninatta and Kulitta, and then once again after the unidentified deity ḫmn and before Anat. In RS 24.291, which describes a three day long celebration of uncertain character focused on the Ugaritic goddess Pidray, mentions that an ewe was sacrificed to him during it. A single theophoric name invoking him has also been identified. Wilfred H. van Soldt notes that it belonged to a local inhabitant, rather than a foreigner.

In the kingdom of Kizzuwatna, Nupatik was worshiped in settlements such as Parnašša and Pišani. In a list of offerings to gods from the circle of Teshub (so-called kaluti) from this area, he appears between Aštabi and Šauška. In other texts belonging to this genre, he is placed between Aštabi and the war god Ḫešui. During the Kizzuwatnean ḫišuwa festival, which was meant to guarantee good fortune for the royal couple, two hypostases of Nupatik (pibitḫi - "of Pibid(a)" and zalmatḫi - "of Zalman(a)/Zalmat") were venerated alongside "Teshub Manuzi", Lelluri, Allani, Išḫara and Maliya. Both of these epithets have Hurrian origin, though the locations they refer to are otherwise unknown. According to Gernot Wilhelm, pibitḫi might be connected to bbt, the name of a "god of the house" mentioned in a single Ugaritic ritual text. Manfred Krebernik instead suggests that bbt might refer to a place name, Bibibta, which in texts from Ugarit appears as a location associated with the worship of Nupatik and, more commonly, Resheph. In another ritual (KUB 20.74 i 3–7, KBo 15.37 ii 29–33) both Nupatik hypostases are linked with Adamma and Kubaba.

From the middle of the second millennium BCE onward, Nupatik was also worshiped by the Hittites in Hattusa. Figure 32 from the procession of gods from Yazılıkaya, which arranged deities similarly to Hurrian kaluti, might represent him.

It is commonly assumed that Umbidaki, a god worshiped in the temple of Ishtar of Arbela in Neo-Assyrian times, was analogous to Nupatik, possibly introduced to Arbela after a statue of him was seized in a war by the Assyrians.
