= Adamma (goddess) =

Eblaite and Hurrian goddess

- Major cult center: Ebla, Hadani, Tunip

Genealogy
- Spouse: Resheph

Adamma was a goddess worshiped in Ebla in the third millennium BCE, later also documented in Hurrian sources and in Emar. The origin and meaning of her name remain a matter of debate among researchers. It is commonly assumed that it originated in one of the Semitic languages and that it can be compared to Hebrew ʾădāmâ, "soil" or "earth". An alternate view is that it belongs to a linguistic substrate at some point spoken in part of modern Syria. Hurrian origin has been proposed as well, but is considered implausible. In Ebla, Adamma received sacrificial sheep on behalf of the royal palace. She also had clergy of her own, as evidenced by references to a dam-dingir priestess in her service. Eblaite texts indicate she was also venerated in Hadani and Tunip. She was locally regarded as the spouse of Resheph, though the connection between them is not attested in later sources. After the fall of Ebla, she was incorporated into Hurrian religion, and in this context appears in Hittite and Ugaritic sources as well, often forming a pair with Kubaba. Furthermore, she was worshiped in Emar, where under the name Adammatera she might have been perceived as a deity associated with storage areas and the underworld. It is also possible that the goddess Admu known from Mari and from the Mesopotamian god list An = Anum was the same deity.

== Name ==
Adamma's name was written in cuneiform as ^{d}a-dam-ma in Eblaite and Hurro-Hittite sources, or as ^{d}a-dama, as attested in Emar. In the Ugaritic alphabetic script, it was rendered as adm. Its etymology is a matter of debate. Karel van der Toorn and Pieter Willem van der Horst compare it with the Hebrew word ʾădāmâ, "soil" or "earth", and suggest it originated in a Semitic language. They state this view was the majority position at the time of publication of the relevant entry in the Dictionary of Deities and Demons in the Bible (1999). Alfonso Archi has instead tentatively suggested a derivation from the root, *ʾdm ("blood, red"), though he argues that ultimately Adamma's name cannot be clearly attributed to any known language, including any of the Semitic languages in particular. He suggests origin in a substrate as an alternative. Harry A. Hoffner and Piotr Taracha also consider her to have her origin in a substrate, similarly as a number of other deities worshiped in ancient Syria who came to be incorporated into Hurrian religion, for example Išḫara and Aštabi. Sometimes Hurrian origin is ascribed to Adamma as well. This view is accepted for example by Gary Beckman. However, Daniel E. Fleming argues it is incorrect, and that while Adamma was worshiped by Hurrians, this should be considered to be the result of adoption of this goddess from the beliefs of another group. He points out that attributing a Hurrian origin to her would require assuming Hurrians lived in Ebla in the middle of the third millennium BCE, but they only migrated into the region in times postdating the duration of the Eblaite archives. Fleming describes Adamma's origin broadly as "north Syrian".

It is assumed Adamma was a female deity. As pointed out by Manfred Hutter, her gender is directly specified as such in the ritual of Ammiḫatna from Kizzuwatna. Fleming initially suggested was Adamma male instead, but later based on Eblaite evidence accepted the view that the name designated a goddess. Volkert Haas considered it possible that the gender of Adamma was variable, but this position is now regarded as unfounded. It relied on the assumption that the name was derived from a combination of the lallnames ada ("father") and amma ("mother"), which found no widespread support among researchers.

== In Eblaite religion ==
The oldest attestations of Adamma have been identified in texts from Ebla dated to around 2400 BCE. She appears in documents listing sacrificial sheep provided by the palace, presumed to reflect the royally recognized official pantheon, though references to her are less frequent than these to the best attested deities, such as various hypostases of Hadabal, Hadda of Aleppo, Resheph and Kura. It has also been pointed out that much like Barama, Išḫara and Ishtar, but in contrast with some of the male deities, she did not have own annual renewal rites. Furthermore, she does not occur in any theophoric names, which according to Alfonso Archi might be a part of a broader pattern involving Eblaite deities originating in a substrate, which he sees as an indication that name giving customs in the city reflected an archaic tradition predating their incorporation into Eblaite religion. A month in the Eblaite calendar interpreted as either first or ninth, ^{d}a-dam-ma(-um), was named after Adamma. A festival dedicated to her, which had a mercantile dimension as it involved the preparation of a market (KI.LAM_{7}) during which textiles and silver were traded, took place during it.

Adamma was one of the deities served by their own dam dingir, "woman of the deity"; this term designated a class of priestesses who came either from the royal family, or from the families of allied monarchs or Eblaite viziers. The attested dam-dingir of Adamma, Dadub-damu, was a daughter of the king of Ḫuzan, and resided in Hadani. Archi stresses that the fact that a woman could be the dam dingir of a female deity makes it implausible that the consecration of such a priestess was seen as a sacred marriage rite, as sometimes suggested. Joan Goodnick Westenholz noted comparisons have been made between the holders of this office and Mesopotamian ereš-dingir and nadītu.

=== Adamma and Resheph ===
In Eblaite sources, Adamma appears as the spouse of Resheph. Eleven cases in which they received offerings together have been identified. They were also worshiped together in nearby Hadani and Tunip. However, the association between them was limited to sources from the kingdom of Ebla from the third millennium BCE, and it does not reoccur in text corpora from other locations and time periods.

The term gunu(m), associated almost exclusively with Resheph, could be linked to Adamma as well. However, the single known reference to "Adamma of Gunum" is isolated. The meaning of this term is uncertain, and Alfonso Archi notes that while a funerary character has been ascribed to it based on a supposed parallel with Ugaritic gn ("garden", possibly implicitly a royal graveyard) this seems implausible in the light of Resheph's character in Eblaite religion. Maciej M. Münnich interprets this term as a toponym, and similarly rules out a connection to funerals, additionally highlighting that the supposed custom of burying rulers in a garden on which this theory rests is not documented in either Ebla or Ugarit. He suggests it might have been the name of an enclosure for animals located in the palatial district of Ebla, based on similarity to Akkadian gunnu, "enclosure", attested in sources from Assyria and Alalakh.

== In Hurrian, Hittite and Ugaritic sources ==
While some of the Eblaite deities ceased to be worshiped after the destruction of the city, for example Kura, Barama and Hadabal, others, like Adamma, as well as Aštabi and Saggar, despite acquiring no major role in religion of the Amorites, who became the dominant power in Syria after the fall of Ebla, came to be incorporated into the religion of the Hurrians, who spread through the region in the early second millennium BCE. In Hurrian sources, Adamma is attested in offering lists (kaluti) dedicated to the circle of deities associated with Ḫepat, in which she appears after Shalash bitinḫi and before Kubaba. In the version of the Hurrian pantheon typical for Kizzuwatna she formed a dyad with the last of these goddesses. Worship of pairs of deities in dyads treated almost as if they were a unity was a common feature of Hurrian religion and other examples include Allani and Išḫara, Ninatta and Kulitta, Hutena and Hutellura and Pinikir and Goddess of the Night. Adamma and Kubaba are also paired in Ugaritic and Hittite sources. Dennis Pardee summarizes that the association between these two goddesses can be considered common. A third goddess, Ḫašuntarḫi, could be linked to them both.

As one of the deities belonging to the pantheon of Kizzuwatna Adamma was venerated during the ḫišuwa festival. It was supposed to ensure the prosperity of the ruler. Adamma received offerings during it alongside Kubaba in temples dedicated to different hypostases of Nupatik. The ceremonies are documented on tablets prepared for Hittite queen Puduḫepa based on Kizzuwatnean originals. She also occurs in a Hittite ritual dedicated to Šauška, KUB XXVII 1+, originally prepared for Muršili II, but later reworked during the reign of Ḫattušili III, and in a similar list of deities in KBo V 2, in both cases after Shalash and before Kubaba and Ḫašuntarḫi. Adamma is also attested as one of the members of the local Hurrian pantheon in texts from Ugarit. In the text RS 24.261, a set of instructions for a ritual focused on Šauška and the local goddess Ashtart combining Ugaritic and Hurrian, she is listed as one of the deities receiving offerings, after the pair Ninatta and Kulitta and before Kubaba.

== In Emar ==
Adamma is attested in texts from Emar. Similarly as in Ebla earlier on, a month in the local calendar was named after her, ^{d}a-dama. It most likely fell in autumn or winter. Not much is known about the celebrations which took place during it. The personal name a-dam-ma is classified as a reference to the goddess as well by Daniel E. Fleming.

=== Adammatera ===
Texts from Emar mention a deity named Adammatera, ^{d}a-dam-ma-te-ra or rarely ^{d}a-^{da}dama-te-ri, with the last sign in the latter case being a genitive ending, It has been argued that this theonym can be considered a longer form of Adamma's name. Joan Goodnick Westenholz and Gary Beckman attribute Hurrian origin to Adammatera. It has been proposed that the suffix might be connected to the Hurrian word teri-, "front". Comparisons have been alternatively made between the structure of this name and tjeonyms such as Adunterra, Muntara and Mutmuntara. Volkert Haas argued that the same suffix is present in all of them and that it originated in a substrate language at some point spoken in Syria. Since some of the celebrations focused on Adammatera took place in the month of Anna, directly before the month of Adamma, Daniel E. Fleming has suggested that the name "may have developed its own cult and drifted free of its original place in the calendar", with its original connection to the latter eventually forgotten. While he states Adammatera was a male deity, according to Westenholz this should be considered a mistake. John Tracy Thames also refers to Adammatera as a goddess in a recent treatment of Emariote religion.

Adammatera was a minor deity in the religion of Emar and is only attested in texts describing a festival focused on the NIN.DINGIR priestess, in an account of an annual cycle of offerings and in a damaged offering list. All of these rituals have local origin. Adamaterra apparently resided in the bīt tukli, seemingly a storehouse which acted as the source of allotments of various supplies for religious personnel. As noted by Thames, no other Emariote deity displays any links to this structure. Fleming has tentatively suggested that she might have been the deity of storage areas. However, he also noted an apparent connection to the underworld. A further location in Emar where Adamaterra was worshiped was the temple of the city god (designated by the sumerogram ^{d}NIN.URTA), as the inscription of a certain Ba‘lu-malik, likely a diviner, dedicated to him also mentions offering of red clothes for Adammatera, We’da and Šaššabêttu. In the damaged offering list, Adammatera is paired with ^{d}NÈ.IRI_{11}.GAL EN KI.LAM, the "lord of commerce" (bēl maḫīri). An association between Adammatera and Šaḫru, possibly a deity analogous to Ugaritic Shahar, is attested in a ritual meant to commemorate the death of a NIN.DINGIR.

== Other attestations ==
=== Mari ===
It has been proposed that Adamma was identical with the goddess Admu. The latter is first attested in an offering list from Mari dated to the Ur III period or the Šakkanakku period. Under the spelling ^{d}NIN.ad-mu, in which the sign NIN serves as an additional determinative clarifying her gender, she appears in it between Nergal and Shamash. She is otherwise only attested in Mariote texts in Old Babylonian theophoric names of women. While not as popular as Annu, Ishtar and Išḫara, she is nonetheless attested comparably often as Kakka and Mamma (presumably corresponding to the divine midwife Mami), with fifteen types of names attested, among them Admu-ummī ("Admu is my mother"), Admu-halṣa ("Admu is a fortress") or Admu-išha ("Admu is my help"). Attestations of Admu from outside Mari are very rare. She appears in the god list An = Anum where she is described as the wife of Nergal (tablet VI, line 13), though this role is also attributed to Laṣ and Mammitum in the same source, with the former appearing in association with said god most commonly elsewhere.

Ichiro Nakata stresses that little can be said about Admu's character aside from her gender, which is confirmed by the combination of her name with feminine elements in theophoric names, though he considers a connection with the underworld possible based on her connection to Nergal. Frans Wiggermann considers her to be an earth goddess and translates her name as "earth". Antoine Cavigneaux and Manfred Krebernik link her to both of these spheres of activity.

=== Disproved or disputed attestations ===
It has been proposed that the goddess Itum (itwm), known from the Leiden Magical Papyrus from the Ramesside Period which identifies her as the wife of Resheph and invokes her to help with curing a disease, was analogous to Adamma. This would constitute the only reference to a connection between these two deities from outside Ebla, though the view that Itum is identical with Adamma remains controversial.

Attempts to connect Adamma with the name of Adam, the first man in biblical tradition, are regarded as unfounded. and while the term ʾădāmâ might be a etymologically related, it is generally demythologized in the Hebrew Bible, with a possible exception being the name Obed-Edom, which has been interpreted as theophoric, with a variant of the theonym Adamma rather than the toponym Edom as the second element.

It has been argued that Adamma's name occurs on a marble tablet dated to 83 or 82 BCE, found on the Roman Agora in Athens but originating in the metroon of Cybele-Agdistis in Rhamnous. However, Ian Rutherford states that it is most likely a title of a cultic official, possibly also mentioned by Hesychius of Alexandria, rather than a reference to this deity. Maria G. Lancellotti stresses that theories linking Adamma to Phrygian religious practice and deities derived from it, such as Agdistis, should be considered implausible hypotheses and rely on outdated interpretations of sources from Anatolia.
