= Adamah =

Hebrew word

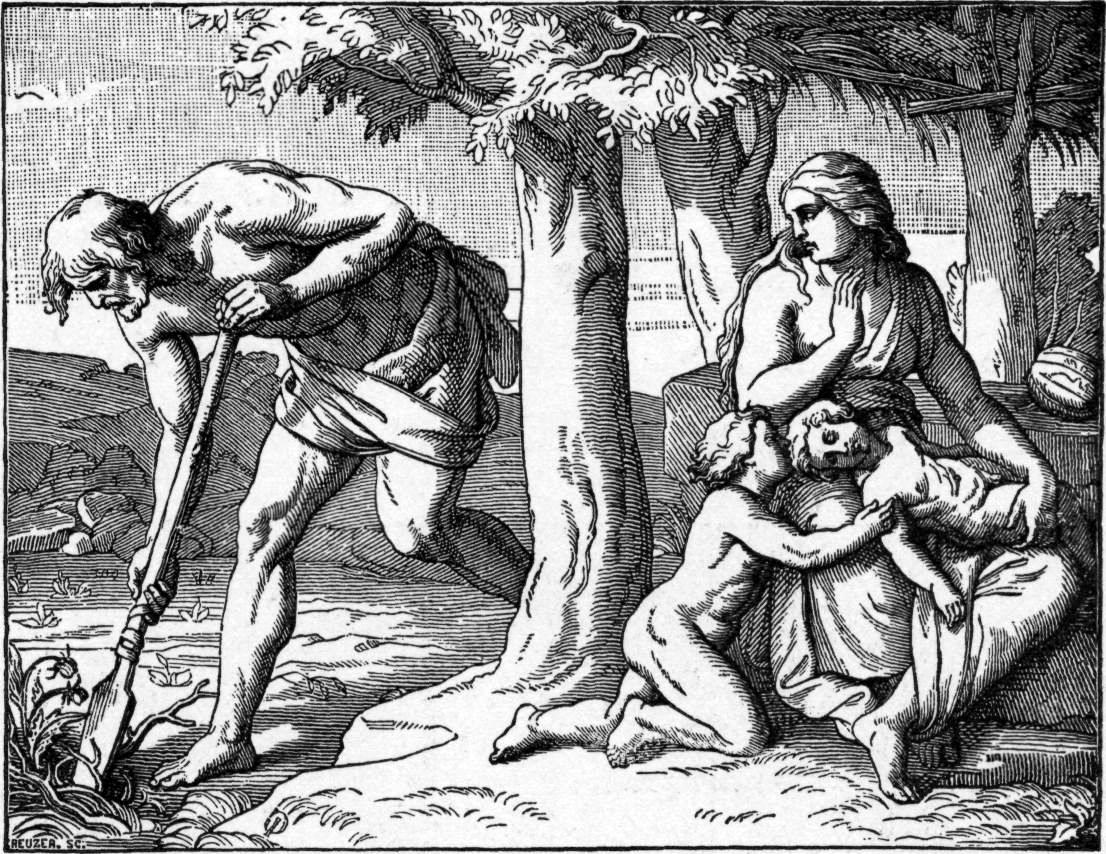
Adam tilling the earth.

Adamah (Biblical Hebrew : אדמה) is a word, translatable as ground or earth, which occurs in the Genesis creation narrative. The etymological link between the word adamah and the word adam is used to reinforce the teleological link between humankind and the ground, emphasising both the way in which man was created to cultivate the world, and how he originated from the "dust of the ground". Because man is both made from the adamah and inhabits it, his duty to realise his own potential is linked to a corresponding duty to the earth. In Eden, the adamah has primarily positive connotations, although Adam's close relationship with the adamah has been interpreted as likening him to the serpent, which crawls upon the ground, thus emphasising his animal nature.

After the fall of man, the adamah is duly corrupted with Adam's punishment of lifelong agricultural toil. This explains why Yahweh (God) favours Abel's sacrifice of sheep to Cain's offering of the "land's produce" - Abel has progressed from the sin of his father, while Cain has not. The adamah is also complicit in Cain's later murder of Abel, swallowing Abel's innocent blood as if to try to conceal the crime. Yahweh punishes Cain by making the ground barren to him, estranging him from the adamah.

In Hebrew, adamah is a feminine form, and the word has strong connections with woman in theology. One analogy is that the adamah is to man as a woman is to her husband: man has a duty to cultivate the earth in the same way that a husband has a duty to be fruitful with his wife. Irenaeus likened the Virgin Mary, who bore the Christ, to the adamah from which Adam came.

== Etymology ==
Adam (אדם) literally means "red", and there is an etymological connection between adam and adamah, adamah designating "red clay" or "red ground" in a non-theological context. In traditional Jewish theology, a strong etymological connection between the two words is often assumed. Maimonides believed the word adam to be derived from the word adamah, analogous to the way in which mankind was created from the ground. In contemporary biblical scholarship there is a general consensus that the words have an etymological relationship, but the exact nature of it is disputed. The word adam has no feminine form in Hebrew, but if it did, it would be adamah. However, it is considered unlikely that the word adamah is a feminization of adam, and the prevailing hypothesis is that both words originate from the verbal stem adam (to be red) and were chosen by the author of Genesis to convey the relationship between man and the adamah.

There is additional relationship between the words adam and adamah and the word dam (דם), meaning blood. This justifies the presence in the Kashrut of the prohibition of the consumption of blood: the blood of a slaughtered animal must be returned to the ground, and covered with earth. The concept could also date back to primitive woman's "birth magic," or the making of clay manikins and anointing them with menstrual blood—the sacred "blood of life"—in order to conceive real children. Women were still making clay manikins to represent people by sympathetic magic through such manikins, in the Middle Ages when such pursuits were redefined as witchcraft. Clay was always a "feminine" material, sacred to women because it was their substance earth. Pottery was a woman's art because of this time-honored association of ideas.

== Role in Genesis ==
In the Jahwist's account of creation, God's first act is to create mankind from the adamah. Before the creation of man, the earth is barren of life, because "there was not a man to till the ground". These verses signify the interdependence of man and adamah - the earth is a desolate wilderness without the attention of man, while mankind needs the produce of the soil to survive.
