= Karhuha =

Tutelary god of Carchemish

- Tutelary god of Carchemish
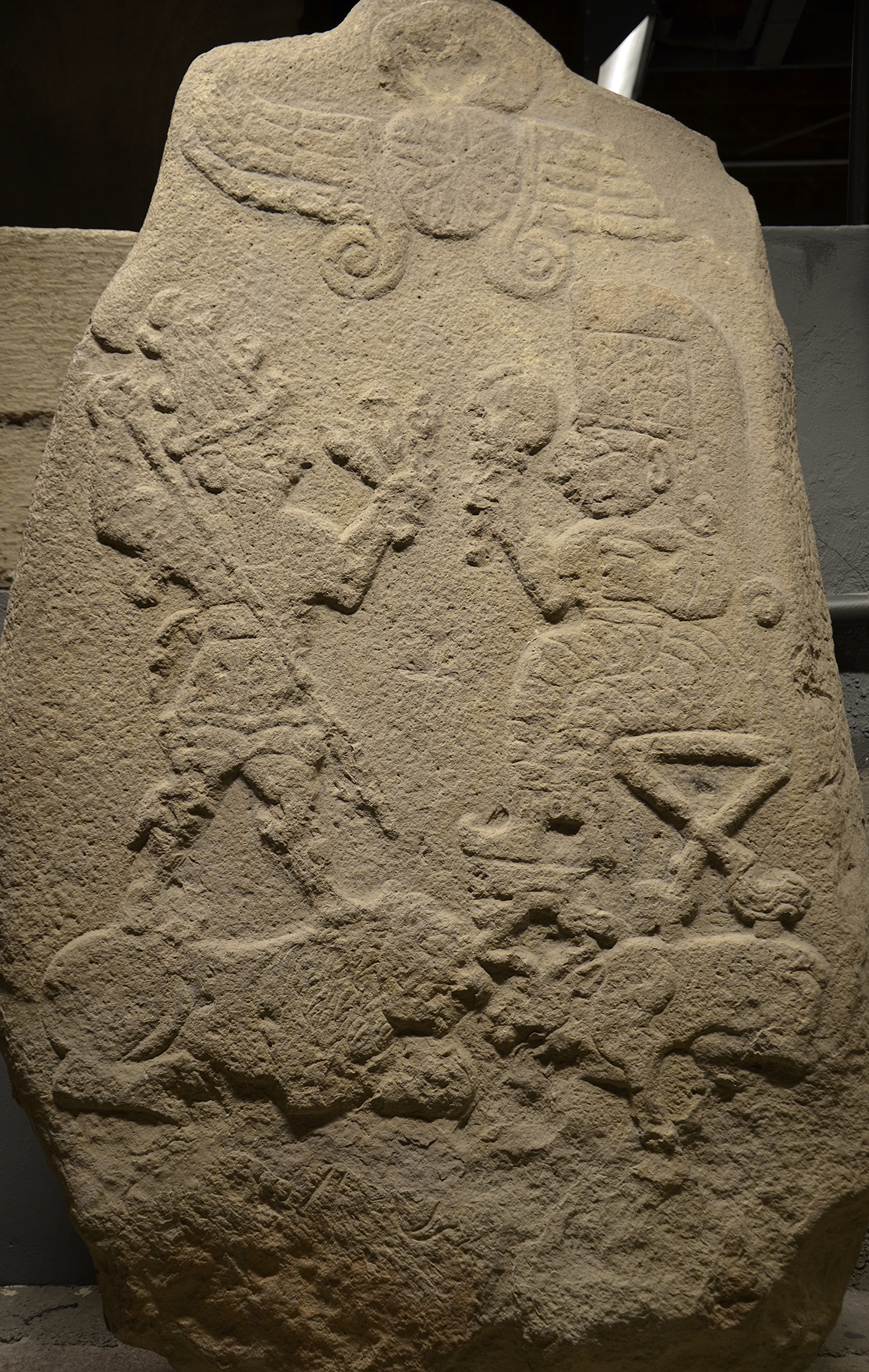
- A stele with depictions of Karhuha (left) and Kubaba. Museum of Anatolian Civilizations, Ankara.

Karhuha (Karḫuḫa), also known as Karḫuḫi, was the tutelary god of the ancient city of Carchemish. It is possible that was associated with deer, and it is presumed his character was similar to that of Hittite Kurunta. He is first attested in texts from the second half of the second millennium BCE, and there is no agreement among researchers if he was a Hurrian god in origin or if similarly to closely associated goddess Kubaba he predated Hurrian control over the region. He appears in a variety of Hittite and Luwian texts, and continued to be worshiped in Carchemish at least up to the reign of Sargon II.

== Name ==
Karhuha's name was written as ^{d}Kar-ḫu-ḫa or ^{d}Kar-ḫu-u-ḫi-iš in cuneiform, which reflects the forms Karḫuḫa and Karḫuḫi, respectively. The breves are often omitted in romanization, leading to the use of the spelling Karhuha in modern literature. The name could also be represented by the logogram ^{d}LAMMA and possibly analogously by CERVUS in Luwian hieroglyphs. In two cases the name is prefaced by the determinative CERVUS_{2} (deer), but these attestations are isolated, and might reflect otherwise unattested reading of CERVUS_{2} as ka.

The etymology of Karhuha's name is uncertain. Livio Warbinek tentatively suggests it might be derived from the Hurrian verb karḫ- (possibly "to hinder", "to encumber"), though he stresses the evidence is not conclusive. It is possible that regardless of the name's etymology, speakers of Luwian might have provided it with a folk etymology, with -ḫuḫa reinterpreted as the homophonous Luwian word, "ancestor". The Luwian reinterpretation might have resulted in a shift from an earlier form Karḫuḫi to Karhuha.

== Character and iconography ==
Karhuha's character is poorly known. It has been suggested that he was regarded as a warlike deity. It has also been argued that he was associated with game animals. Based on the use of the same logograms to write their names, Piotr Taracha assumes that he was a Kurunta-like figure similarly portrayed as a stag god. Volkert Haas outright described these two deities as identical. Alfonso Archi accepts some of their characteristics might have been similar, but argues they should be kept separate, and points out they were worshiped separately from each other in Malatya. Similar conclusions have been reached by Tatiana Frühwirt, who argues it is not possible that they were identical. Support for her interpretation of the evidence has been voiced by Livio Warbinek. However, while Frühwirt accepts that Karhuha's character might have resembled that of Kurunta (Runtiya), since the latter appears instead of him alongside Kubaba in Kummuḫ, Warbinek considers this implausible. He instead suggests that his character might have resembled that of either Šarruma or a weather god.

On a limestone stela discovered in Malatya Karhuha, identified by name by the accompanying hieroglyphic Luwian inscription, is portrayed as an armed deity, with a curved blade hanging from his belt, a spear in his right hand and an unidentified three-pronged object in his left hand. Since depictions of many Luwian gods with the last of these attributes are known, it is unlikely to be a symbolic representation of lightning, as sometimes suggested, and might instead be a type of plant. He stands on a lion, while the other deity depicted on the same object, Kubaba, stands on an animal which might be a stag, which apparently represents an exchange of symbols between them. However, the identification of the second animal is not entirely certain, and the evidence for an association between Karhuha and stags is scarce. Interpreting it as a bull has also been proposed.

Textual sources indicate that Karhuha was closely associated with Kubaba; he never appears on his own, without her, and according to Frühwirt likely served as her paredros. Alfonso Archi assumes they were envisioned as a couple.

== Worship ==
Karhuha is attested in sources from between the fourteenth and eighth centuries BCE. He was one of the main deities in the local pantheon of Carchemish, the other being Kubaba. Very few references to him have been identified in sources from other locations. Gianni Marchesi and Nicolò Marchetti assume that he was a Hurrian deity in origin, and that he entered the local pantheon when the city came under the control of the Mitanni Empire. Alfonso Archi argues that similarly to Kubaba he predated the period of Hurrian rule over Carchemish. However, due to lack of attestations predating the second half of the second millennium BCE it is not likely that he can be identified with Il-Karkamis ("the god of Carchemish"), a byname of an unknown deity who was associated with Carchemish in the Old Babylonian period. (Note: Marchesi and Marchetti suggest that at the time the tutelary god of the city was instead Mesopotamian Nergal.)

Karhuha is largely absent from Hittite texts, save for a number of possible references in damaged passages. These exceptions include two treaties between Hittite kings and rulers of Carchemish, Šuppiluliuma I and Šarri-Kušuḫ (CTH 50) and Šuppiluliuma II and Talmi-Teššup (CTH 122), both of which mention Karhuha as a deity worshiped in Carchemish. Further less certain possible examples are ritual texts reflecting Hurrian and Kizzuwatnean traditions (CTH 500, CTH 705) and an account of Šuppiluliuma I's conquest of Carchemish, in which a deity designated by the logogram ^{d}LAMMA, possibly to be identified with Karhuha, appears in association with the same city. The last of these texts states that the aforementioned king restored the temples of Karhuha and Kubaba.

A hieroglyphic Luwian inscription on a silver bowl from the collection of the Museum of Anatolian Civilizations in Ankara mentions a ruler bearing the Hurrian theophoric name Mazi-Karḫuḫa, but its dating is uncertain. It has been argued that it dates to the thirteenth century, and that Mazi-Karḫuḫa was a local ruler of Carchemish, though conclusive evidence is lacking. Alternatively, it has been dated to the eleventh century, with the labarna Tudḫaliya mentioned in the inscription possibly being a local ruler of Carchemish rather than one of the Hittite kings bearing this name.

The majority of other attestations of Karhuha are hieroglyphic Luwian texts postdating the eleventh century BCE. Most of them are brief royal inscriptions invoking him either in curse or legitimation formulas. An inscription of Katuwa (reigned c. 880 BCE) mentions a procession involving Karhuha and Kubaba. Another text from his reign mentions offerings made to both of these deities and Tarhunza. A curse formula invokes this group alongside the sun, the moon and Parakara, presumed to be a late form of Pinikir, possibly a divine representation of Venus in this context. A different curse formula invoking Karhuha, Kubaba and Santa has been identified on an unprovenanced bowl fragment.

Karhuha is mentioned alongside Kubaba among the foreign (ie. non-Mesopotamian) deities invoked in a section of the treaty between the Assyrian king Ashur-nirari V and Mati-El, the Aramean ruler of Arpad in Bit Agusi.

The last known reference to Karhuha has been identified in an inscription on a cylinder from Carchemish dated to the reign of Sargon II, which also mentions him alongside Kubaba.

== Mythology ==
Alfonso Archi suggests that the Hurrian myth Song of ^{d}LAMMA originated in Carchemish, possibly specifically during the period when the city was under Mitanni control, and involved Karhuha, though he presumed that in the known Hittite version of ^{d}LAMMA was read as Kurunta, similarly to how Tarḫunna served as a stand-in for Teshub. In this composition, a god designated by the logogram ^{d}LAMMA temporarily becomes the king of the gods after defeating Teshub and Shaushka, but eventually proves to be unsuitable for this position, and after ignoring Kubaba's suggestion he is deposed, and later ends up subjugated by the weather god he displaced earlier.
