= Kubaba (goddess) =

Hurro-Hittite goddess

- Tutelary goddess of Carchemish
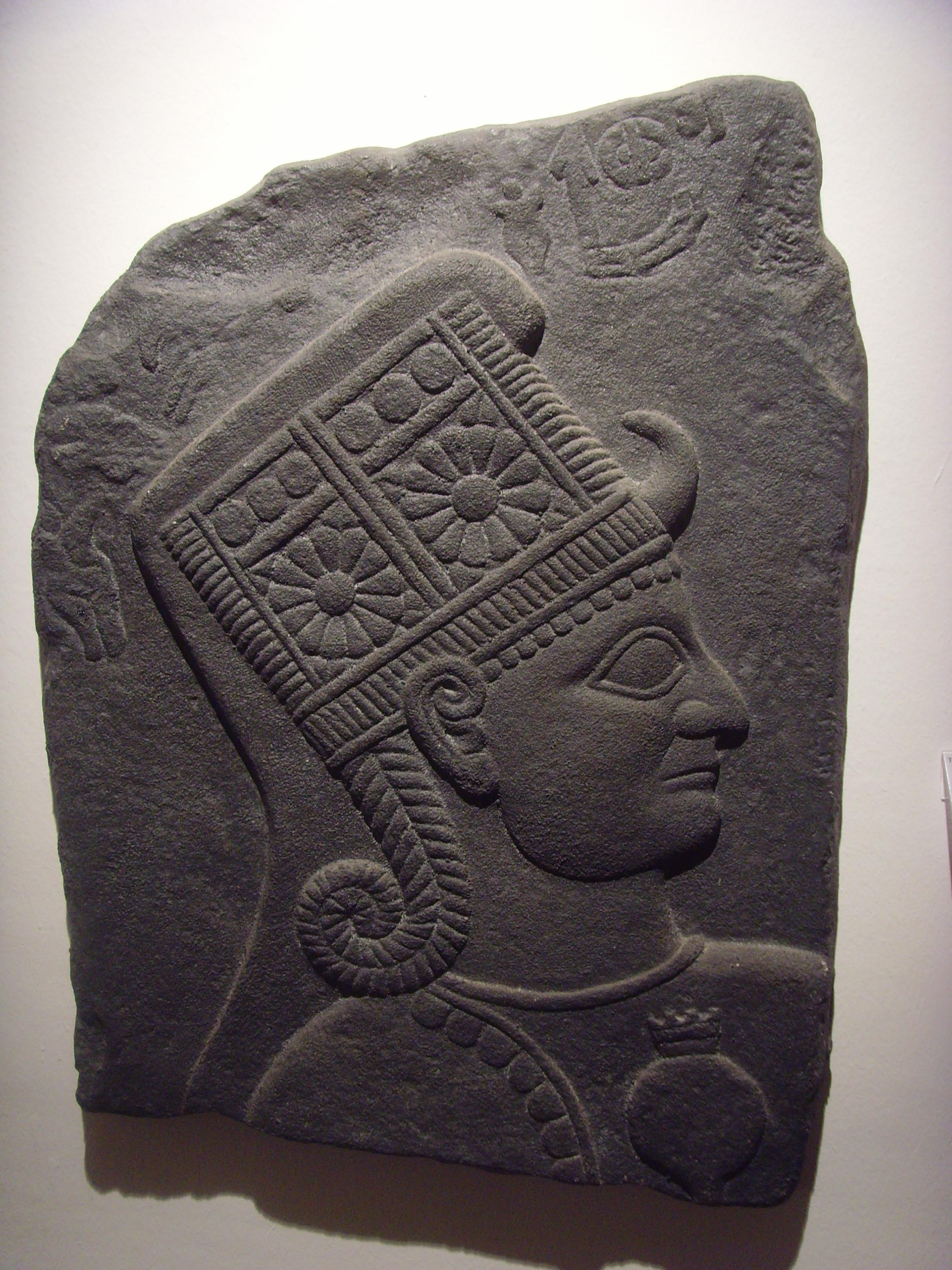
- Relief portrait of Kubaba
- Major cult center: Carchemish, Alalakh, Sam'al, Sardis
- Animals: bird, lion
- Symbols: mirror, pomegranate

Kubaba was a goddess of uncertain origin worshiped in ancient Syria. Despite the similarity of her name to these of legendary queen Kubaba of Kish and Phrygian Cybele, she is considered a distinct figure from them both. Her character is poorly known. Multiple local traditions associating her with other deities existed, and they cannot necessarily be harmonized with each other. She is first documented in texts from Kanesh and Alalakh, though her main cult center was Carchemish. She was among the deities worshiped in northern Syria who were incorporated into Hurrian religion, and in Hurrian context she occurs in some of the Ugaritic texts. She was also incorporated into Hittite religion through Hurrian intermediaties. In the first millennium BCE she was worshiped by Luwians, Arameans and Lydians, and references to her can be found in a number of Greek texts.

== Name ==
The theonym Kubaba was written in cuneiform as ^{d}ku-ba-ba or ^{d}ku-pa-pa, with the latter variant attested in Hittite texts. Kubabat, attested in Old Assyrian texts from Kanesh, is presumed to be another variant. It was written in cuneiform as ku-ba-ba-at. Volkert Haas suggested the morpheme t can be identified as a Semitic feminine suffix. In the Ugaritic alphabetic script, Kubaba's name was written as kbb (𐎋𐎁𐎁), in hieroglyphic Luwian as (DEUS)ku-AVIS, and in Aramaic as kbb.

The meaning of Kubaba's name is unknown. Alfonso Archi rules out origin in one of the Semitic languages. This view is also supported by Ilya Yakubovich. Gonzalo Rubio additionally states that Kubaba's name has no clear Sumerian etymology either, and due to this theonym's structure compares it to names such as Alala, Aruru, Belili or Zababa. As already argued by Volkert Haas in the 1970s, it might have originated in a substrate. More recently support for this view has been voiced by Piotr Taracha. Rubio states that attempts have been made to prove that Kubaba and other similarly structured theonyms originated in a single substrate language, sometimes referred to with the informal name "banana language", but this view found no universal support and there's no evidence that similar reduplicated names shared linguistic origin. Rostislav Oreshko instead ascribes Hurrian origin to Kubaba. He cites the use of the title ala-, a derivative of the Hurrian word "mistress", to refer to her in Luwian sources as possible evidence.

=== Kubaba and queen Kubaba ===
A legendary queen of Kish whose name can be romanized as Kubaba occurs in the Sumerian King List, but due to spatial and temporal differences a connection between her and the goddess Kubaba is not possible to establish. The name of the queen is theophoric, and can be translated from Sumerian as "radiant Baba". It invokes a Mesopotamian goddess worshiped in Lagash, whose name according to Gianni Marchesi was likely originally pronounced as Bau rather than Baba.

=== Kubaba and Gubaba ===
Whether Gubaba (^{d}gu-ba-ba) known from the Assyrian Tākultu ritual, as well as other ritual texts and the god list An = Anum, was the same deity as Kubaba is uncertain, and it has been alternatively proposed that this name refers to a masculine deity comparable to either Nergal or Amurru. Bel-Eresh, a ruler of Shadikanni who was a contemporary of Ashur-resh-ishi I, renovated the temple of Samnuha and a deity identified by Stephanie Dalley as Kubaba, ^{d}gu-ba-ba.

=== Kubaba and Cybele ===
Emmanuel Laroche proposed in 1960 that Kubaba and Cybele were one and the same. This assumption continued to be repeated in academic publications as recently as in the 2000s. For example, in an article published in 2008 Mark Munn voiced support for the equivalence between the two argued that the Phrygian name Cybele developed from Lydian adjective kuvavli, first changed into kubabli and then simplified into kuballi and finally kubelli. However, the aforementioned adjective is a purely speculative construction. Other authors generally consider Cybele and Kubaba to be two fully separate goddesses. Ian Rutherford notes they were only confused by Greek and Roman authors, despite the distinct origin of their names. The Phrygian forerunner to Cybele, Matar Kubeleya, occurs in two inscriptions dated to the sixth century BCE. It is now agreed that her name has Phrygian origin, as already proposed in the late 1970s and it might be linked either to a specific mountain near Pessinus known to Greeks as Kubela, or alternatively to a Phrygian phrase meaning "of the mountain". The title matar means "mother" and most likely was used to refer to different Phrygian deities, similarly to epithets such as potnia did in Mycenean Greece. Differences in character between the two goddesses have also been pointed out: Kubaba was never addressed as a mother, and her character was civic, with no attested link to nature (or specifically mountains), in contrast with Cybele.

Manfred Hutter notes both Cybele and Kubaba were worshiped in Lydia, and assumes that the spread of Phrygian influence combined with the burning down of the temple dedicated to the latter which existed in Sardis lead to the downfall of her cult and its gradual replacement by that of Cybele. Rutherford states that despite the distinct origin of the two goddesses, it cannot be ruled out that the familiarity with the form of Kubaba worshiped in Sardis among the Greeks also influenced the incorporation of Cybele into ancient Greek religion, and that Cybele's iconography was influenced by Kubaba's. The scope of such an association would be limited, and the validity of this proposal remains speculative.

== Character and iconography ==
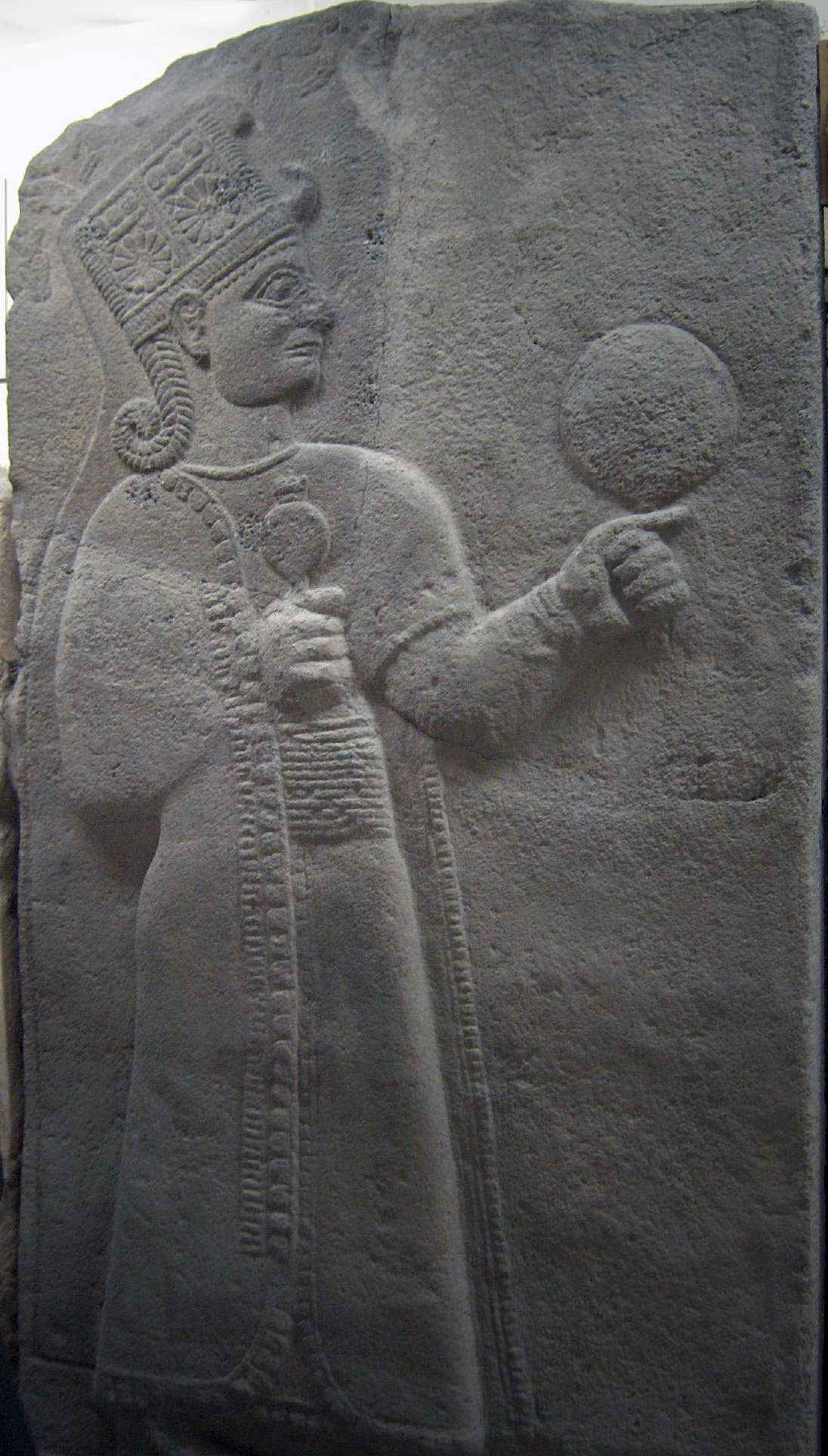
A relief of Kubaba. Museum of Anatolian Civilizations, Ankara, Turkey

Little is known about Kubaba's character. Hurro-Hittite ritual texts offer little information about her roles or the specifics of her cult. Luwian sources from Carchemish describe her as benevolent. Alfonso Archi characterizes her as a goddess associated with lawsuits. Ian Rutherford described her as a "civic deity".

As evidenced by art from Carchemish and Arslantepe, Kubaba was depicted seated on a throne, holding a mirror and a pomegranate, with a polos-like crown on her head and a veil placed either over it or on her shoulders. An orthostat belonging to the so-called "Long Wall of Sculpture" in Carchemish, dated to the reign of Suhi II (second half of the tenth century BCE) has been argued to depict Kubaba holding a branch and an object which might be a pomegranate, but as noted by Nicolò Marchetti and Hasan Peker the former would be an unusual attributes for her. However, they do accept that a fragmentary depiction of another goddess belonging to the same set of reliefs can be identified as her. It has been also argued that the relief of a seated goddess holding a mirror from Sam'al is a depiction of Kubaba, though this identification is not based on any inscriptions.

Based on the presence of the sign AVIS in the hieroglyphic Luwian writing of her name is it presumed Kubaba was associated with birds, per analogy with the animal symbol of Karhuha, the deer, being reflected in the use of the sign CERVUS is his name, but it not certain what qualities of the goddess were reflected by this symbol, and she was never depicted in the company of birds. No other specific animal associations are attested for her, as sporadic depiction in the company of lions most likely stems from her role as a city goddess, and an alleged connection to fish relies entirely on a dubious proposal that her name could be represented by the logogram ^{d}KU_{5}, "fish".

== Associations with other deities ==
Manfred Hutter states that multiple local traditions linking Kubaba to various deities existed, and it is not necessarily possible to harmonize them. In the Hurrian pantheon of Kizzuwatna, she formed a dyad with Adamma, a goddess already attested in the texts from Ebla. They are also paired in texts from Ugarit. The connection between them developed in the second millennium BCE, and earlier Adamma was instead considered the spouse of Resheph. In some cases, the dyad consisting of Kubaba and Adamma could be expanded into a triad with the inclusion of Hašuntarhi. These three deities are listed in sequence in the kaluti (Hurrian offering lists) of Ḫepat.

In Carchemish, Kubaba was closely associated with the local god Karhuha. She is also paired with him in an inscription from Malatya. Alfonso Archi argues that he was regarded as her husband.

The assumption that Kubaba was associated with the Mesopotamian goddess Ishtar present in a number of older publication is now considered mistaken, as it exclusively relied on an erroneous restoration of a single line in one of the succession treaties of Esarhaddon, which as established later mentions Karhuha and Kubaba.

Aramaic inscriptions from Castabala (Hierapolis) in Cilicia indicate that in the fifth century BCE Kubaba was locally identified with Artemis Perasia.

== Worship ==
=== Early attestations ===
It is presumed Kubaba originated in the north of modern Syria, though she is also attested in Old Assyrian texts already. Under the variant name Kubabat she appears in sources from Kanesh. Piotr Taracha notes that the presence of deities such as her, Nisaba and Išḫara in the local pantheon and the absence of Hattian ones shows that the religion of the city was influenced by traditions of southern Anatolia, northern Syria and Mesopotamia. References to priests of Kubabat (kumrum or GUDU_{4}) have been identified in texts from Kanesh.

Early attestations of Kubaba have also been identified in texts discovered during excavations of Alalakh, where theophoric names invoking her occur. A certain Ili-Kubaba is attested as a witness in legal text. A different theophoric name invoking Kubaba, Ini-Kubaba, has been identified in the impression of a seal inscription which identifies its owner as a servant of king Yarim-Lim I of Yamhad, who reigned from Aleppo and was a contemporary of Zimri-Lim of Mari. Manfred Hutter argues that the Amik Valley, corresponding to the ancient state of Mukish centered in Alalakh, was the area where Kubaba was originally worshiped and that she only spread to Carchemish and Anatolia from there. Rostislav Oreshko argues against this view, pointing out that Kubaba was never linked with a city other than Carchemish. He attributes the preservation of early theophoric names invoking her in texts from Alalakh to chance, rather than to particular importance there.

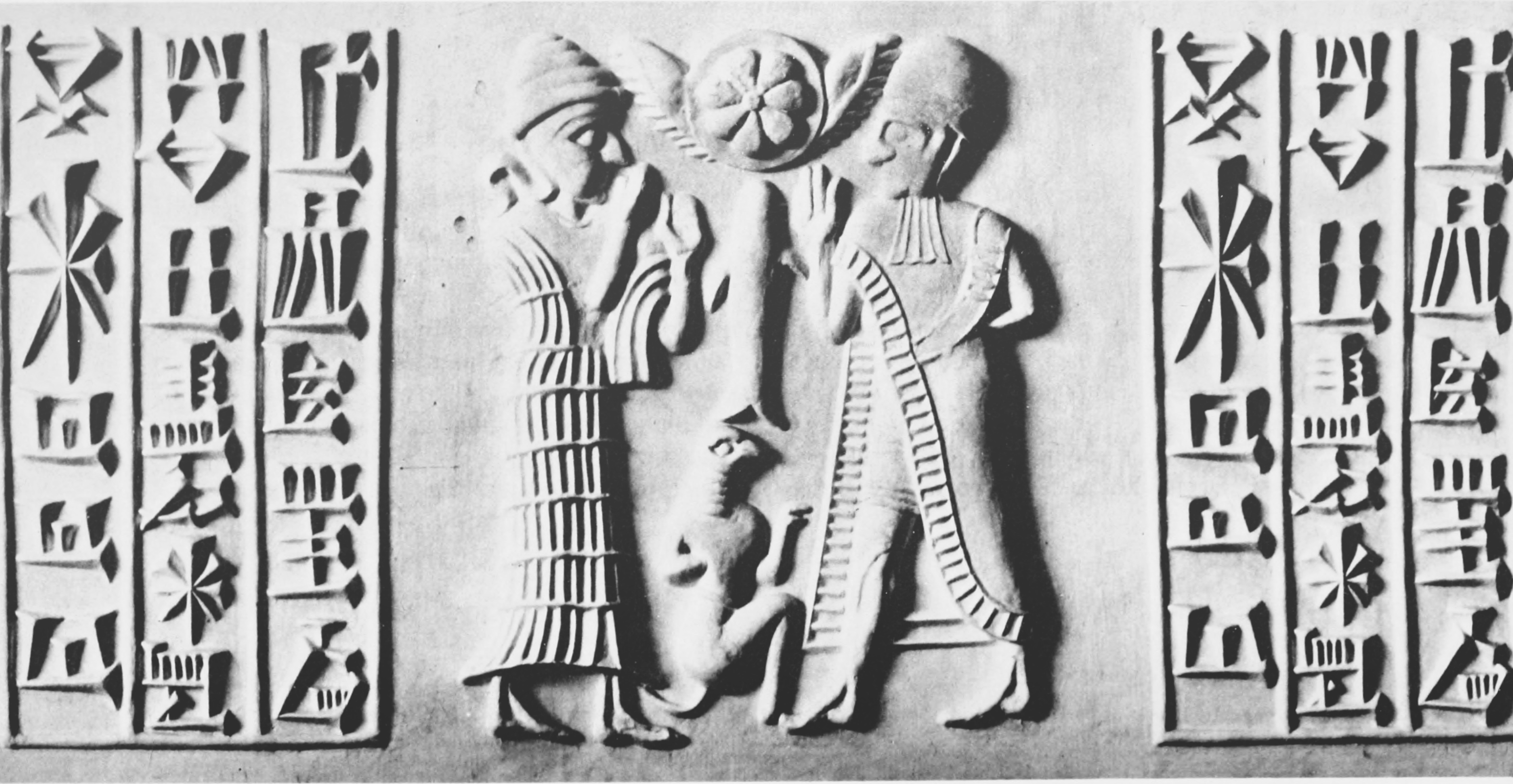
A seal from Carchemish, dedicated to goddess Kubaba by Matrunna, daughter of Aplahanda, 18th century BCE.

Kubaba is already attested as the tutelary goddess of Carchemish in the eighteenth century BCE. A cylinder seal of uncertain provenance dated to around 1770 BCE already links her with this city. It belonged to princess Matrunna, the daughter of the local king Aplahanda. Sources from the Middle Bronze Age indicate that Kubaba was one of the three principal deities of Carchemish, the other two being Nergal and Nubandag.

=== Hurrian and Hittite reception ===
Kubaba was also incorporated into Hurrian religion after the arrival of Hurrians in Syria, similarly to a number of other local deities, such as Aštabi, Adamma, Ḫepat, Išḫara and others. She was one of the Hurrian deities worshiped in Ugarit. In the ritual described on the tablet RS 24.261, which contains instructions in both Ugaritic and Hurrian and focuses on Ashtart and Šauška, Kubaba is listed among deities receiving offerings after Adamma. A letter written in standard syllabic cuneiform, RS 20.182c, mentions a festival held in her honor, but it is not known if it took place in Ugarit itself or elsewhere, and its time is unspecified. Two theophoric names invoking Kubaba have been identified in texts from Ugarit dated to the reign of the local king Arḫalba (1315-1313 BCE). While her role in the onomasticon was only marginal, the individuals bearing these names were nonetheless local inhabitants rather than foreigners temporarily staying in Ugarit.

References to Kubaba have also been identified in the text corpus from Emar. She occurs in theophoric names. A Hurrian text from this city mentions her alongside her cult center, Carchemish, in a passage which also lists Išḫara and Ebla and a deity whose name is not preserved, presumably Shuwala, and Mardaman.

Kubaba was among the deities of foreign origin who came to be worshiped by the Hittites in Hattusa. It has been argued that she is best documented in Hittite context, despite not being a Hittite deity in origin. Hittites adopted Hurrian traditions pertaining to her from northern Syria and Kizzuwatna. From the reign of Šuppiluliuma I onward, her cult center, Carchemish, served as the center of Hititte administration in northern Syria. However, she remained a minor deity in Hittite religion. In texts from the Bogazköy Archive she appears among the deities mentioned in kaluti (offering lists) of the Hurrian goddess Hebat, usually alongside Adamma, Hašuntarhi, or both of them.

=== First millennium BCE ===
==== Luwian attestations ====
From the Hurrian milieu of northern Syria, Kubaba was also incorporated into Luwian religion, though the transfer apparently occurred relatively late, in the early first millennium BCE. In the Iron Age, she nonetheless became the main goddess in the Luwian pantheon. Possibly in the aftermath of the fall of the Hittite Empire, Hurrian and Luwian traditions mixed, leading to the formation of the late form of the Luwian pantheon, which included her. She continued to be worshiped in Carchemish. She could be referred to as its "queen" (Luwian: karkamisizas hasusaras). Kings of this city often invoked her, and at least one of them used the epithet "beloved of Kubaba". Ura-Tarhunza credited her and Tarhunza with bestowing courage over him. A hieroglyphic Luwian inscription written between 1200 BCE and 1000 BCE, or later in a deliberately archaizing style, discovered in the proximity of the city might refer to a granary of Kubaba, with its anonymous author being appointed to the position of the "lord of the house" thanks to being the first person to ever fill it. Kubaba is also referenced in an inscription of Hamiyata, king of Masuwari (Tell Ahmar) among the deities supporting this ruler. Her cult additionally spread to Kommagene, Malatya, and other settlements. However, the Luwian form of it seemingly never reached further west or north than Tabal.

==== Aramean attestations ====
Arameans also integrated Kubaba into their pantheon in the first millennium BCE. She was the main deity in the kingdom of Sam'al. She is invoked alongside Rakkab'el in an inscription on the stele of Ördek-Burnu, in which she might be addressed as "Kubaba of Aram", possibly to be understood as northern Syria in this context, though the restoration of the passage is uncertain. Herbert Niehr suggests that she might have been syncretized with an unidentified Aramean goddess in this area. An inscription of Kuttamuwa, a servant of king Panamuwa of Sam'al, mentions the offering of a ram to Kubaba. Kubaba also appears in an Aramaic context alongside Resheph on a stele from Tell Sfir dated to the eighth century, which might reflect the adoption of her cult directly from Carchemish. She is listed among deities invoked in the oath formula in a treaty between the Aramean king Mati'el of Arpad and Ashur-nirari V.

==== Lydian and Greek attestations ====
Infrequent references to Kubaba occur in Lydian sources, and according to Manfred Hutter can be interpreted as an indication of transmission of Luwian traditions. However, it is not certain how and when Kubaba reached Lydia. According to Ian Rutherford, the Lydian form of Kubaba's name was Kuwawa. This form of the name was transcribed in Greek as Κυβήβη by Herodotus. Rostislav Oreshko notes that the correspondence between the Lydian goddess and Kubaba is generally accepted in scholarship, but expresses doubts about it himself due to lack of evidence for cultural contacts between Lydia and Luwian states where she was worshiped. Only two attestations occur in Lydian texts, one of them being an Achaemenid funerary inscription from the necropolis in Sardis which also invokes Šanta and the Marivdas, a group of deities analogous to earlier Luwian Marwainzi.

According to Herodotus, Kuwawa's temple in Lydia was burned by Greeks, seemingly accidentally, during the Ionian Revolt in 498 BCE. A further reference to the same deity occurs in a passage attributed to Hipponax, which mentions a goddess named Kubebe in passing. She is listed alongside Thracian Bendis and described as a daughter of Zeus. The reasons behind listing these two goddesses together is unknown. The name Kybebe also occurs in the lexicons of Photius and Hesychius, who both report that this name was used to refer to Aphrodite among Lydians and Phrygians, relying on the testimony of Charon, a historian who lived in northwestern Anatolia in the fifth century BCE. However, it is not certain whether these sources are reliable, and the absence of any cults of Aphrodite in Hellenistic Lydia might indicate that the local goddess was only superficially similar to Aphrodite, and later on the inhabitants of the region identified her with another Greek goddess instead. The references to a Phrygian tradition might indicate that Phrygians worshiped Aphrodite under a similarly sounding epithet, as it is unlikely Cybele is the deity meant due to her dissimilar character. Hesychius also asserts "some others" used this name to refer to Artemis, which might indicate the Lydian goddess simply had no direct correspondence in the Greek pantheon.

== Mythology ==
In the Hurrian Kumarbi cycle, known mostly from Hittite translations, she plays a minor role, appearing in the Song of LAMMA, an early section of the cycle dealing with the conflict between Teshub and an unspecified tutelary god whose name was represented by the sumerogram LAMMA. After LAMMA starts to neglect his duties as freshly appointed king of gods, she urges him to pay attention to senior deities like Kumarbi and the "former gods" inhabiting the underworld, but he seemingly does not follow her advice and eventually loses his position as a result. Alfonso Archi suggests that LAMMA should be understood as Karhuha.
