= Aštabi =

Eblaite and Hurrian god

- War God
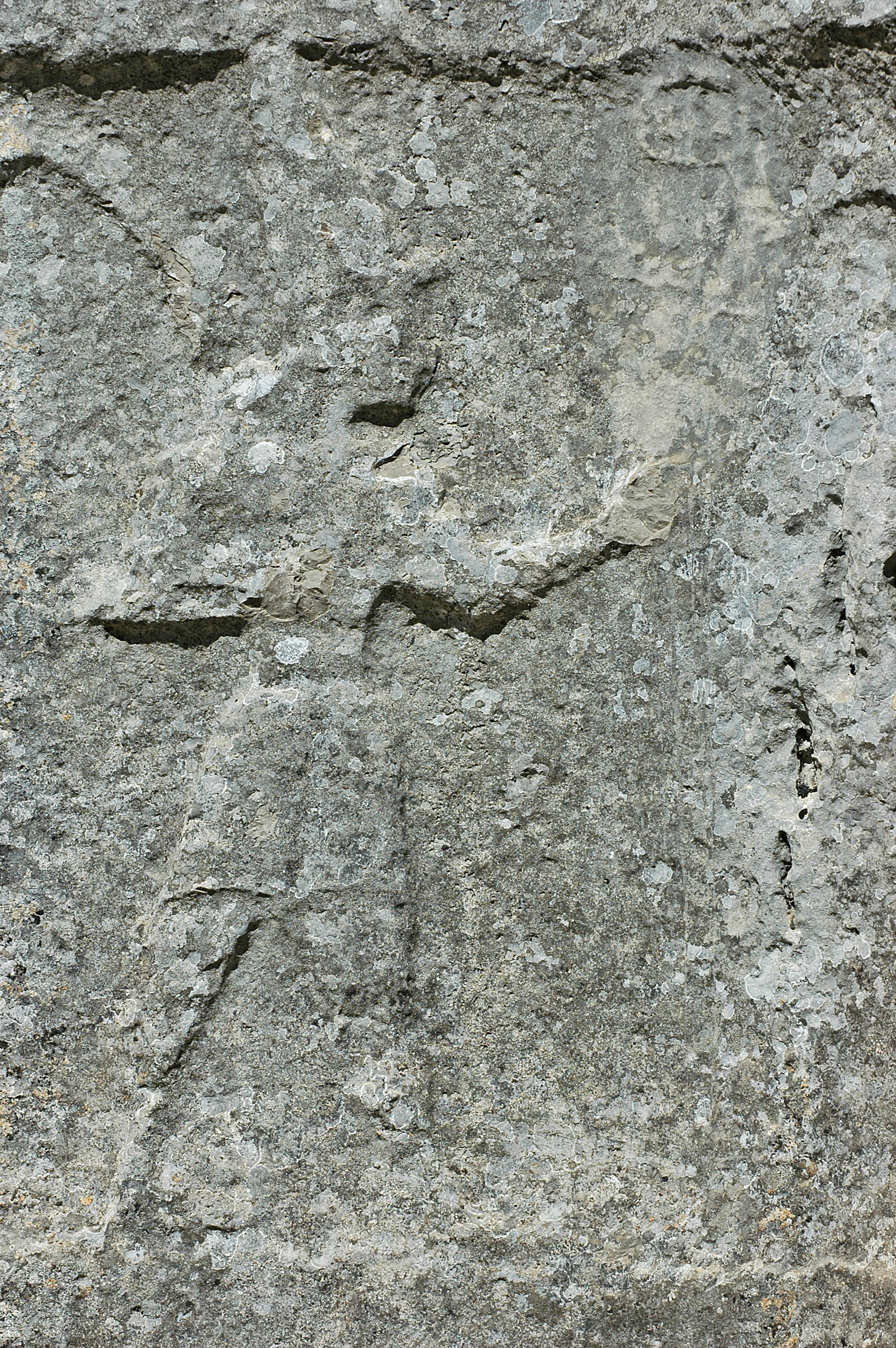
- A relief of Aštabi from Yazılıkaya
- Major cult center: Ebla
- Consort: Baradu-madu (in Ebla)

Equivalents
- Mesopotamian: Lugal-Marada, Ninurta or Zababa
- Ugaritic: Attar

Aštabi (Ugaritic: 𐎀𐎌𐎚𐎁, aštb), also known as Aštabil, was a god worshiped in the third millennium BCE in Ebla, later incorporated into Hurrian beliefs in locations such as Alalakh and Ugarit and as a result also into the religion of the Hittite Empire.

== Name and origin ==
The attested writings of the name are Aštabi (in Alalakh and Hattusa), Aštabil/Ašdabil (in Ebla and Mari), aštb and possibly `ṭtpl and `ṭtpr (alphabetic spellings from Ugarit).

Aštabi is regarded as one of the so-called "Syrian substrate deities" by researchers. While present in the Hurrian pantheon and in earlier documents from Ebla, names of members of this group are assumed to have pre-Hurrian and most likely pre-Semitic origin.

Initially Hurrian origin had been ascribed to Aštabi by researchers based on the similarity of his name to those of Kumarbi and Nabarbi, but this is no longer regarded as plausible due to the existence of earlier forms ending with -bil rather than -bi. While a Semitic origin of the name has also been proposed, with a reconstructed hypothetical original form Yaštabi-El ("El has satisfied himself"), it is regarded as implausible due to reliance on assigning presently unattested sign values to Eblaite spellings of the name.

== Functions ==
In the Hurrian (and by extension Hittite) pantheon Aštabi was a war god. This aspect of his character is also well attested in Ugaritic texts. However, despite a considerable number of mentions in known documents, his original role in the pantheon of Ebla cannot be presently determined. The available information does not point at the warlike character known from later sources, as unlike Adad he did not receive weapons as offerings, though Alfonso Archi does not consider it fully implausible that theoretically he could have been a war god in the third millennium BCE already.

== Worship ==
The worship of Aštabi is well attested in documents from Ebla, and it was widespread in the area under the control of the city, with the names of at least three cult centers of this god appearing in records: Ba-še^{ki}, Du-ub^{ki} (later Tuba), and Ìr-ku^{ki}. However, it is Ebla itself which was the primary site associated with him.

One Eblaite document mentions statues of Aštabi and Baradu-madu. Both of them are also involved in a purification ceremony meant to return the health of the prince Ir'aq-Damu.

According to Alfonso Archi, after the fall of Ebla Aštabi was among the gods who did not retain their former position in the religion of the Amorites, who became the dominant culture in Syria. He lists Adamma, Ammarik, Šanugaru and Halabatu as other similar examples. He assumes that they were reduced to the status of deities of at best local significance, and as a result were easily incorporated into the religion of the Hurrians when they arrived in the same area a few centuries later. In some cases, direct influence of earlier Eblaite tradition was nonetheless still present in later tradition, for example a "month of Aštabi" known from the Eblaite calendar is still attested in texts from Alalakh from the second millennium BCE.

In Yazilikaya he's represented as one of the gods following Teshub in procession (figure 33); in front of him stands Šimige and behind him Nupatik.

== Associations with other deities ==
In 3rd millennium BCE Ebla he was sometimes associated with ^{d}Ba-ra-du ma-du, possibly to be read /BarD-u(m)/, who was possibly his spouse. She is sparsely attested in known texts, but Alfonso Archi notes this stands true for spouses of other gods as well, Barama associated with Kura and Halabadu (Hebat) associated with Adad. While her character is uncertain, it is possible she was a divine representation of a river flowing near the city of Ebla, possibly Queiq.

In Hurrian sources he sometimes formed a triad with Ugur (who in this context appears under the epithet "Šaumatar") and Nupatik, according to Volkert Haas based on their shared association with warfare. The character of Nupatik is generally regarded as uncertain, though Haas is not the only author to ascribe the role of a warrior god to him, and especially the fact he received items related to archery as offerings is considered to be possible evidence supporting this theory.

In god lists Aštabi was equated with a variety of other deities of similar characters. An Ugaritic "polyglot" list equated him with the local god Attar and Mesopotamian Lugal-Marada (a war god whose cult center was Marad, analogous in part to both Nergal and Ninurta), while a Babylonian god list equated "Aštabinu" with the war god Zababa. In Yazilikaya he's identified by the logogram "NIN.URTA."

According to Meindert Dijkstra, in Hittite sources he was sometimes equated with Tašmišu, older brother and sukkal of Teshub. However, both appear in the procession of deities in Yazilikaya.

Alfonso Archi considers it possible that Nergal's name, found in early Hurrian inscriptions from Urkesh, could be an ideographic stand-in for Aštabi's (similar to how Shaushka's name was ideographically represent as ^{d}IŠTAR and Teshub's as ^{d}IŠKUR), though he notes that it's also been proposed that the god represented by it might be Kumarbi, and that it cannot be ruled out the Mesopotamian god might not merely be a logogram, as his sukkal Ugur is well attested in the Hurrian pantheon, making it plausible he was himself worshiped by the Hurrians.

A number of ritual texts from Ugarit feature both Attar and a god bearing the name 'ṭtpl or 'ṭtpr, commonly identified as Aštabi by researchers. It has been proposed that their origin is not necessarily Hurrian, but rather Semitic, and that they are responsible for the equation of these two deities in god lists.

== Mythology ==
Aštabi appears in only one Hurro-Hittite myth, the Song of Ullikummi, part of the cycle of myths centered on the struggle between Teshub and Kumarbi. After the initial defeat of Teshub in combat with the eponymous stone monster, the other gods provide Aštabi with chariots. Alongside his 70 unnamed allies he confronts the monster, but fails and as a result falls into the sea, while his adversary continues to grow until he reaches the city of the storm god, Kummiya. Eventually Teshub, rather than the war god, vanquishes Ullikummi. The reference to "seventy gods" is unique in the light of known Hurrian and Hittite sources, and according to Noga Ayali-Darshan most likely represents a borrowing from western Semiticliterature, as similar terms are known from Ugarit ("seventy sons of Athirat") and Emar ("seventy gods of Emar").
