= Walther Sallaberger =

Austrian assyriologist

- Born: 3 April 1963; Innsbruck
- Alma mater: LMU Munich
- Occupation: Assyriologist, writer, editing staff, editor
- Employer: LMU Munich

Walther Sallaberger (born 3 April 1963 in Innsbruck) is an Austrian Assyriologist.

== Life ==
From 1982 to 1988, Walther Sallaberger studied languages and cultures of the ancient Near East as well as classical archeology at the University of Innsbruck. He learned Hittite, Old Persian, Turkish and Hebrew in addition to the common languages of the disciplines. From 1982 to 1989, he took part in prehistoric excavations in Austria, in Eski Mosul and Borsippa in Iraq, in Velia in Italy and in Pergamon in Turkey.

Sallaberger has been a professor of assyriology at LMU Munich since September 1999. From 2005 to 2007, he was director of the Department of Cultural Studies and Classical Studies at LMU Munich, from 2007 to 2009 Dean of the Faculty of Cultural Studies.

Guest lectureships have taken him to the University of Bern (1992/93), Ca' Foscari University of Venice (2001), the University of Oxford (2002), the Venice International University (2004) and the University of Verona (2007). In 2012, the Bavarian Academy of Sciences and Humanities chose him as a full member.

== Some works ==
- Walther Sallaberger (1992). Der kultische Kalender der Ur III-Zeit. Untersuchungen zur Assyriologie und vorderasiatischen Archäologie. Vol. 7. Walter de Gruyter. ISBN 9783110889253.
- Walther Sallaberger (1999). "Wenn Du mein Bruder bist, ...". Interaktion und Textgestaltung in altbabylonischen Alltagsbriefen. Cuneiform monographs. Vol. 16. Styx, Groningen. ISBN 90-5693-029-X. OCLC 248651573.
- Das Gilgamesch-Epos. Mythos, Werk und Tradition. Beck, München. 2008. ISBN 978-3-406-56243-3.
