= Išḫara =

Tutelary goddess of Ebla

- Tutelary deity of Ebla, goddess of love, oaths and divination
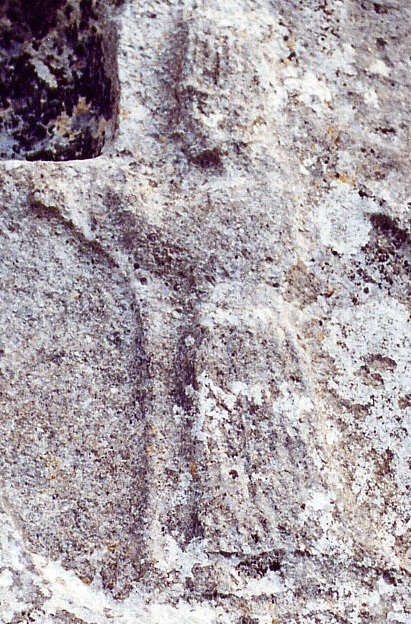
- A possible depiction of Išḫara from Yazılıkaya.
- Major cult center: Ebla, Mane, Alalakh, Emar, Išur, Artanya, Tauriša, Neriša
- Symbols: bašmu, later scorpion
- Festivals: kissu, zukru, ḫišuwa

Genealogy
- Parents: Enlil and Apantu
- Spouse: usually none, rarely Saggar (in An = Anum)

Equivalents
- Mesopotamian: Ishtar

Išḫara was a goddess originally worshipped in Ebla and other nearby settlements in the north of modern Syria in the third millennium BCE. The origin of her name is disputed, and due to lack of evidence supporting Hurrian or Semitic etymologies it is sometimes assumed it might have originated in a linguistic substrate. In Ebla, she was considered the tutelary goddess of the royal family. An association between her and the city is preserved in a number of later sources from other sites as well. She was also associated with love, and in that role is attested further east in Mesopotamia as well. Multiple sources consider her the goddess of the institution of marriage, though she could be connected to erotic love as well, as evidenced by incantations. She was also linked to oaths and divination. She was associated with reptiles, especially mythical bašmu and ḫulmiẓẓu, and later on with scorpions as well, though it is not certain how this connection initially developed. In Mesopotamian art from the Kassite and Middle Babylonian periods she was only ever represented through her scorpion symbol rather than in anthropomorphic form. She was usually considered to be an unmarried and childless goddess, and she was associated with various deities in different time periods and locations. In Ebla, the middle Euphrates area and Mesopotamia she was closely connected with Ishtar due to their similar character, though they were not necessarily regarded as identical. In the Ur III period, Mesopotamians associated her with Dagan due to both of them being imported to Ur from the west. She was also linked to Ninkarrak. In Hurrian tradition she developed an association with Allani.

The worship of Išḫara is well documented in Eblaite texts. Next to Resheph, she has the most attested hypostases of all Eblaite deities, and she was venerated in many settlements in the area controlled by it. Royal devotion to her is well documented. She could receive offerings in the temple of the city god Kura, though she had her own house of worship as well. She retained a connection to Eblaite kingship at least until the seventeenth century BCE, despite many other Eblaite deities ceasing to be worshiped after the initial destruction of the city in the twenty fourth century BCE. She was also worshiped in Nabada in the third millennium BCE already. In Emar she is well documented in texts from the fourteenth and thirteenth centuries BCE, such as accounts of the kissu and zukru festivals, though it has been suggested she was already worshiped there earlier. She is also attested in theophoric names from Mari, Tuttul, Terqa and Ekalte. She was also transferred further east where she came to be incorporated into the Mesopotamian pantheon. She is already attested in Old Akkadian sources from Kish and the Diyala area. She was once again introduced from the west in the Ur III period, and was worshiped by members of the ruling house of the Ur state. Transfer to the north, to Assyria and its karum Kanesh, is also documented. She is also attested in many Babylonian cities in the Old Babylonian period, though in some cases only in theophoric names. She continued to be worshiped through the Kassite and Middle Babylonian periods, and through the first millennium BCE, with late evidence available from Babylon and Uruk. Due to her importance in Syria she was also incorporated into Hurrian religion, and in Hurrian context was worshiped in Alalakh and various cities in Kizzuwatna. She is also attested in Hurrian texts from Ugarit, though she was incorporated into the non-Hurrian pantheon of this city as well. She is also documented in Hittite sources, with individual traditions focused on her introduced to the Hittite Empire from the sixteenth century BCE onward from Syria and Kizzuwatna.

Both Mesopotamian and Hurrian myths involving Išḫara are known. As a goddess of marriage, she is referenced in the Epic of Gilgamesh and Atrahasis. In the Hurrian Song of Release she is portrayed as the goddess of Ebla and attempts to save the city from destruction. In the Song of Kumarbi, she is among the deities the narrator invokes to listen to the tale.

== Name ==
Multiple writings of Išḫara's name are attested in cuneiform texts. A bilingual lexical list from Ebla contains the entry ŠARA_{8} (BARA_{10} = GÁ×SIG_{7})-ra = iš-ḫa-ra. Another spelling attested in texts from this city ^{d}ŠÁR-iš. Name of a month and personal names from Ebla including the sign AMA were proposed to refer to Išḫara in publications from the 1980s, but this possibility is not regarded as plausible anymore. Another possible partially logograpic writing, ^{d}LAGABxIGI-gunû, has been identified on a fragment of a vase found in Tell Agrab; the name was formerly read as Shara, but as pointed out by Giovanni Marchesi and Nicolo Marchetti, it would be unusual for this Mesopotamian god to be worshiped in this area. The syllabic spelling ^{d}aš_{2}-ḫa-ra occurs in a treaty between Naram-Sin of Akkad and an Elamite ruler and reflects the form Ašḫara. A legal text from Old Babylonian Sippar preserves the variant eš-ḫar-ra. In the Ugaritic alphabetic script, Išḫara's name was usually rendered as ušḫry, though a single instance of išḫr has been identified in the text RS 24.261, written in Hurrian. Volkert Haas suggested the Ugaritic form of the name can be romanized as Ušḫara and compared it with a variant attested in a single Hittite text, KUB 27.19, where the name is written as ^{d}uš-ḫa-ra. Dennis Pardee vocalizes the Ugaritic form of her name as Ušḫaraya. The logogram ^{d}IŠTAR could sometimes be employed to represent Išḫara's name in Hurrian sources. Examples are known from Alalakh. In some cases it is uncertain whether it designated her, Ishtar or Šauška in personal names from that city. The variant ^{d}IŠTAR-ra used the sign -ra as a phonetic indicator, clarifying the name of the goddess meant. Another logographic writing, ^{d}ÍB.DU_{6}.KÙ.GA, a synonym of GÍR.TAB, "scorpion", is known from the Mesopotamian god list An = Anum. The Egyptian version of a treaty with the Hittite Empire from the twenty first year of Ramesses II's reign (1259 BCE) preserves the spelling isḫr. Her name is prefaced in this text by the cobra determinative, also used to designate names of Egyptian goddesses in other sources.

The etymology of Išḫara's name has been a subject of Assyriological inquiries since the early twentieth century. Attempts to prove that it originated in an Indo-European language are limited to scholarship from the first decades of the twentieth century, and have since been conclusively rejected due to lack of evidence that any languages belonging to this family were spoken in the ancient Near East in the third millennium BCE. Hurrian origin had been ascribed to her early on as well, similarly as in the case of other Eblaite deities (Adamma, Aštabi and Ḫepat), but further excavations in Ebla have shown that all of these deities are already present in documents predating the Hurrian migrations to Syria. Furthermore, as noted by Doris Prechel, a is atypical as a final vowel in etymologically Hurrian theonyms. Origin of the name in one of the Semitic languages has also been proposed. Wilfred G. Lambert considered it possible that Išḫara's name was connected to the root *šhr ("dawn"), going as far as proposing this as explanation for her well attested association with Ishtar. However, doubts about the validity of this proposal have been expressed by Volkert Haas, who considered an origin in a linguistic substrate more likely. Thorkild Jacobsen's attempt to demonstrate that Išḫara's name was derived from the West Semitic root *šʿār, "barley", is also regarded as implausible as no sources treat her as an agricultural goddess, and none of her epithets connect her with grain. Lluís Feliu in a more recent study notes that all of the proposed Semitic etymologies for the name of Išḫara "do not fit (...) [her] profile very well". Alfonso Archi states that the name most likely originated in a substrate which was neither Semitic nor Hurrian, and ascribes similar origin to a number of other Eblaite deities, such as Aštabi, Adamma, Kura and NI-da-KUL (Hadabal). The view that Išḫara was one of Syrian deities incorporated into the Hurrian pantheon whose names were derived from a linguistic substrate is also supported by Piotr Taracha. Archi identifies the area Išḫara was first worshiped in as located east of the city of Ebla itself, but still within its sphere of influence. This proposal is also supported by Irene Sibbing-Plantholt.

== Character ==
The oldest attestations of Išḫara from Ebla, such as these in documents from the reign of Irkab-Damu, indicate she was a tutelary goddess of the royal house. Her role differed from that of Kura and Barama, who were also connected to the royal family, but seemingly functioned as a divine reflection of the reigning monarch and his spouse, rather than as dynastic tutelary deities. According to Joan Goodnick Westenholz, after being transmitted eastwards to Mesopotamia in the third millennium BCE, Išḫara lost this aspect of her character. However, various later sources still recognize her as the tutelary goddess of this city. A Hurrian text discovered in Emar refers to her as eb-la-be, "of Ebla". It is also possible that the goddess Iblaītu known from the Tākultu rituals was analogous to her, though she has been alternatively interpreted as an epithet of Ishtar. Alfonso Archi proposes that she originated as a hypostasis of Išḫara associated with Ebla who reached Assyria in the Middle Assyrian period through Hurrian intermediaries.

Išḫara was associated with love in the texts from Ebla, and Piotr Taracha speculates this was the oldest aspect of her character. She was represented in this role in Mesopotamia as well, in part possibly due to her association with Ishtar, though Frans Wiggermann regards the two of them as independent from each as goddesses of love. She could be referred to as the "lady of love", bēlet râme. She was specifically connected to the institution of marriage, as documented in a number of Akkadian šuillakku prayers, which were typically focused on requests of an individual person. However, as noted by Gioele Zisa incantations associate her with erotic love as well.

As evidenced by the epithet bēlet bīrim, "lady of divination", which is known from Syrian sources and the god list An = Anum, and references to "Išḫara of the prophetesses" in texts from Emar, Išḫara was strongly associated with divination and prophecy. It is presumed that this role first developed in Babylonia in the first half of the second millennium BCE. According to the Old Babylonian Bird Omen Compendium, finding a red spot (sūmum) below the right armpit of the carcass of a sacrificed bird was an omen meant to be interpreted as "position of Išḫara and Ḫišamītum". Such formulas indicate that the location of ominous spots on the carcass was seen as an allusion to the position (manzāz) of astral bodies associated with specific deities in the night sky. The same compendium states that a red spot located on the head of the bird was regarded as an omen indicating Išḫara requests new clothes.

Išḫara was also invoked as a guardian of oaths. In this context, she could be referred to as šarrat māmīti, "queen of the oath(s)". Alfonso Archi has suggested that the sparsely attested theonym Memešarti known from Hurro-Hittite sources was a derivative of this title, with the order of the two components reversed. However, Gernot Wilhelm instead assumes that Memešarti might have been a group of deities, with the name being a collective noun with the Hurrian element -arde. In Hurrian context, as a deity of oaths Išḫara was referred to as elmiweni or elamiweni. Hurro-Hittite sources indicate she was believed to punish oath-breakers, usually by inflicting them with a disease. The Hittite verb išḫarišḫ- referred to being inflicted by an "Išḫara illness". It is not known what disease was referred to with this term. It is also uncertain if the term "hand of Išḫara" known from compendiums of omens from Mesopotamia and Emar referred to the same phenomenon. However, it was also believed that if placated with offerings, Išḫara could serve as a healing goddess.

In Hurrian context, Išḫara developed an association with the underworld. However, according to Wilfred G. Lambert it is also documented for her in Mesopotamia.

Alfonso Archi notes that in Ebla Išḫara sometimes received weapons as offering, much like Hadad, Resheph and Hadabal, which according to him might indicate she had a warlike aspect as well, which he considers comparable to a similar characteristic of Ishtar. He proposes that as a warrior goddess she was possibly associated with axes.

A further epithet applied to Išḫara in Mesopotamia, bēlet dadmē, "lady of the dwellings", is interpreted as an indication of an "urban" or "civic" role, and has been compared to analogous titles of Ishtar, Nanaya, Marduk and Dagan (the last attested in Emar), similarly designating them as the deities linked to the "inhabited regions" and civic life.

Dennis Pardee states that in Ugaritic context in addition to fulfilling her primary roles as a goddess of oaths and divination, Išḫara was also linked to justice.

Išḫara could also be associated with cannabis. This plant, known in Akkadian as qunnubu, is explained as the "herb of Išḫara" in a Neo-Assyrian text, BM 103295. However, said passage finds no parallel elsewhere.

== Iconography ==
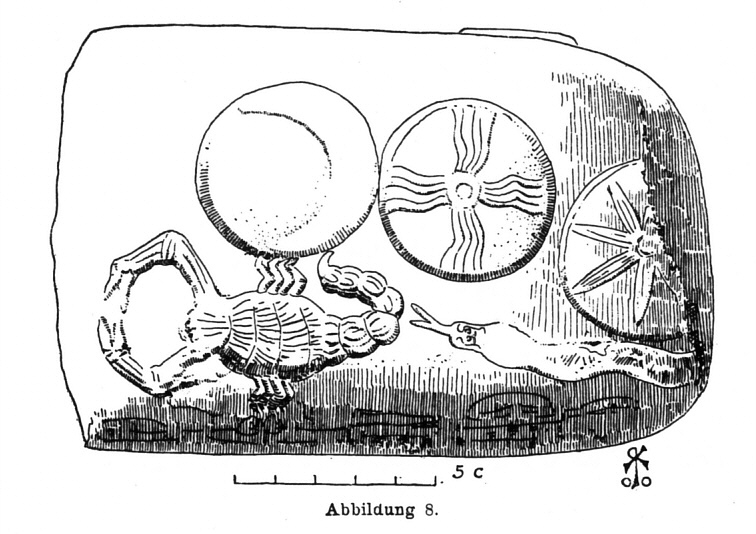
A scorpion, the symbolic representation of Išḫara, on a kudurru.

Išḫara was portrayed as a youthful goddess. She could be referred to with the Hurrian epithet šiduri, "young woman".

In Mesopotamia Išḫara's symbol was initially the bašmu, a mythical snake elsewhere associated with underworld gods, such as Tishpak or Ninazu. In her case, it was connected to oath taking, as attested in sources from the Old Babylonian period. It has been argued that Išḫara's position in the Old Babylonian Nippur god list where she occurs side by side with the snake god Niraḫ also reflects her association with snakes. However, this view is not universally accepted, and it has been alternatively proposed that the sequence Geshtinanna-Niraḫ-Išḫara attested in it does not reflect any theological connections. A link between Išḫara and reptiles is also attested in texts from Ugarit. KTU 1.115 (RS 24.260) refers to her as ḫlmẓ. This term is vocalized as ḫulmiẓẓi or ḫulmiẓẓu and is a cognate of Akkadian ḫulmiṭṭu, as well as Hebrew khómet (חֹמֶט), which refers to a type of reptile in Leviticus 11:30, and Syriac ḥulmōtō, "chameleon". While it has been translated simply as "snake" or "lizard", Aisha Rahmouni proposes that it designates a mythical creature analogous to bašmu, rather than a real animal. She relies on descriptions of the appearance of the Akkadian ḫulmiṭṭu in lexical texts, which clarify that the term designates a mythical snake with legs. Dennis Pardee assumes this epithet designated a "reptilian form" of Išḫara.

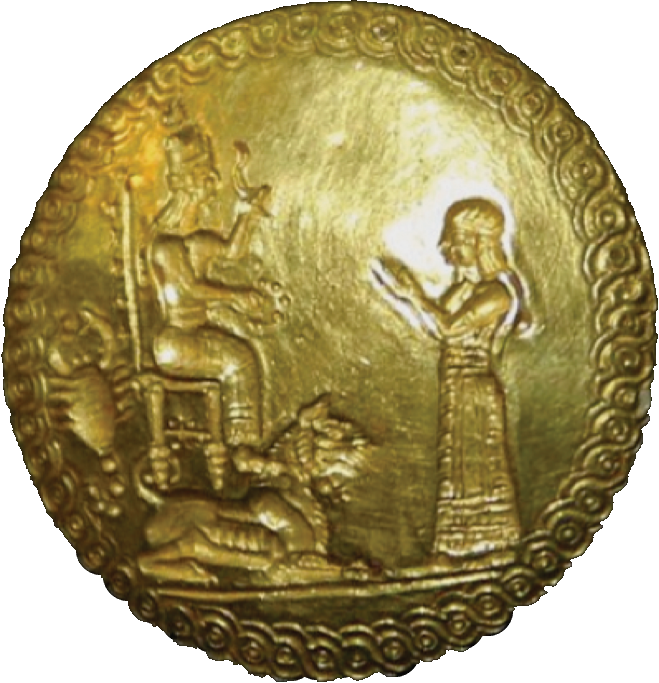
The seal of the Assyrian queen Hamâ with a scorpion symbol possibly representing Išḫara.

In later periods in Mesopotamian art, for example on decorated boundary stones (kudurru), Išḫara was instead associated with scorpions. While scorpions are present in Mesopotamian art from the Early Dynastic period already, Doris Prechel stresses that even if they served as symbols of a deity, it cannot be assumed that it necessarily was Išḫara. Neither the reason behind the change in her symbolic animal nor the reasons behind the attribution of either of them are known. No depictions of her from the Kassite and Middle Babylonian periods are anthropomorphic, and she came to only be represented in art by her symbol. Incised images of scorpions presumably reflecting this animal's connection with Išḫara have been identified on two late Babylonian legal documents signed by prebendaries linked to her. It has been suggested that scorpions depicted on items which belonged to Assyrian queens might also be connected to the iconography of Išḫara, one example being the seal of Hamâ, the wife of Shalmaneser IV, with a goddess accompanied by a scorpion and either a lion or a dog, though the validity of this assumption is not universally accepted. In Mesopotamian astronomy, Išḫara was associated with ^{mul}gir-tab (literally "scorpion star"). A description of this constellation, which corresponds to Scorpius, is preserved in the compendium MUL.APIN:

The Scorpion, Išḫara, goddess of all inhabited regions. The breast of Scorpius: Lisi, Nabû. The two stars which stand in the sting of Scorpius: Šarur and Šargaz.

== Associations with other deities ==
=== Family and court ===
No texts focused on establishing Išḫara's genealogy have been identified, and the only reference to other deities being regarded as her parents occurs in a single source from Hattusa. It documents a Hurrian tradition according to which she was viewed as a daughter of Enlil. Gary Beckman restores the names of her parents in the relevant passage of this text, which he refers to as the Song of Going Forth, as "Enlil and Apantu" (though in a later passage Enlil occurs with Ninlil instead). Alfonso Archi in his translation of the same passage chooses to leave the names blank.

According to Volkert Haas Išḫara was regarded as both unmarried and childless. Archi states that she was one of the three most commonly worshiped Hurrian goddesses who had no spouses, the other two being Allani and Šauška. Lluís Felieu notes that while Išḫara was associated with various male deities in different time periods and locations, most evidence does not indicate that she was believed to have a permanent spouse in other traditions either. In a number of Mesopotamian love incantations, she is paired with almanu, a common noun of uncertain meaning whose proposed translations include "widower", "man without family obligations", or simply "lover". In one case the term is written with a divine determinative, as if it were the proper name of a deity. Išḫara and almanu can occur in parallel with Ishtar and Dumuzi and Nanaya and an unnamed lover. Ryan D. Winters argues that almanu is likely to be a title of a deity regarded as Ishara's spouse reflecting a hitherto unknown myth. A single Mesopotamian text commenting on magical formulas meant to protect a house from supernatural invaders refers to the Sebitti as her sons, but Frans Wiggermann in his study of this group of gods assumes that this should be considered a result of confusion between Išḫara and similarly named underworld god Enmesharra, whose children the Sebitti were frequently identified as.

In the Mesopotamian Weidner god list, Išḫara appears among deities associated with Adad, after this god himself, his wife Shala and their son Mīšaru, and before ^{d}MAŠ-da-ad (reading of the first sign after the determinative is uncertain) and Geshtinanna. In An = Anum she is placed in the section dedicated to Enlil and his entourage. Doris Prechel notes it offers a parallel to their connection in Hurrian tradition. She is also present in the section focused on Ishtar, and in a further passage which according to Prechel deals with the circles of Adad, Shamash and Ea. In the last case she is equated with Nisaba, but the reasons behind this connection remain uncertain, and it might depend only on the use of the theonym ME.ME as a logogram to represent both of these names. Winters argues that this connection might reflect their shared association with wisdom, relying on the characterization of Ishara in Hurrian Song of Release. An = Anum also states that Išḫara had an attendant (^{munus}SUKKAL) named Tašme-zikru (Akkadian: "She answered my word" or "She answered the word"), a minor goddess also attested in the Isin god list. A further Mesopotamian deity associated with her was Ningirima, a goddess associated with incantations, who shared her connection with snakes and with the "scorpion star".

In Kizzuwatna, Ḫalma and Tuḫḫitra belonged to the entourage of Išḫara. Another deity associated with her in the same sources was Saggar, assumed to be analogous to the Eblaite Sanugaru, who was worshiped with her in Mane in the third millennium BCE already. He was likely a moon god. The compilers of An = Anum labeled him as the spouse of Išḫara. According to Volkert Haas, a connection between them is also attested in sources from Emar and the Khabur area. Doris Prechel instead states that while both Saggar and Ḫalma are attested in texts from Emar, neither of them shows an apparent connection to Išḫara in this context. Other moon gods were associated with Išḫara in Hurro-Hittite oath formulas. In this context she was frequently linked with the Hurrian moon god, Kušuḫ (Umbu) and his spouse Nikkal due to their shared role as protectors of oaths.

In Emar, Išḫara could also be paired with the city god designated by the sumerogram ^{d}NIN.URTA, possibly to be identified with Il Imari, "the god of Emar", attested in sources from the same site. Prechel additionally notes that in Babylon her temple was located close to that dedicated to Ninurta.

=== Išḫara and Ishtar ===
Ishtar (written logographically as ^{d}INANNA or syllabically as ^{d}aš-dar) already appears alongside Išḫara in Eblaite texts, including a ritual performed by the royal couple which involved statues of both of them, in which she is referred to as Labutu, a cognate of her well attested Akkadian epithet lābatu ("lioness"). A theophoric name, Išḫara-ki-Ištar, "Išḫara is like Ishtar", indicates they were also seen as similar in popular religion in the upper Euphrates area. The association between both of them and the western Ashtart is well attested in god lists from Ugarit. Alfonso Archi proposes that the perception of Ishtar and Išḫara as similar figures might have originally developed due to the former being superimposed over the latter's original position in Ebla.

In Mesopotamia Išḫara and Ishtar were associated with each other as goddesses of love, as already attested in Old Akkadian love incantations. In later periods they were invoked in them alongside Nanaya, Kanisurra and Gazbaba as well. Some of these texts use formulas such as "at the command of Kanisurra and Išḫara, patron goddess of love" or "at the command of Kanisurra and Išḫara, patroness of sex". In the incantation series Šurpu, Išḫara is listed alongside multiple goddesses who could be regarded as hypostases of Ishtar, including Bēlet-ayyaki (Ishtar of Uruk), Annunitum and Šiduri. However, as pointed out by Joan Goodnick Westenholz, a passage from Atrahasis commonly used in modern literature to argue the two were one and the same in Mesopotamian perception does not actually state that Ishtar was identical with Išḫara, as the noun ištar is not preceded by the dingir sign, so-called "divine determinative," in it, and as such should be translated as the generic term "goddess" rather than as the theonym Ishtar. The use of ištar or ištarum or as a common noun which could refer to any goddess, a synonym of iltum, the feminine form of ilu ("god"), goes back to the Old Babylonian period. To differentiate it from the name Ishtar, it was consistently written without the divine determinative.

=== Išḫara and Dagan ===
Oldest evidence for a connection between Išḫara and Dagan comes from the Ur III period, specifically from the reign of Shu-Sin, and they continued to appear together in texts from the reigns of his successors Amar-Sin and Ibbi-Sin as well. However, the connection between them was limited to Mesopotamian sources, with no attestations from other areas, and was most likely rooted only in their shared western origin and the resulting foreign status they shared in the eyes of Mesopotamian theologians. A secondary factor might have been a shared connection to divination. Western sources from modern Syria do not link them with each other. In the god list An = Anum both Išḫara and Dagan are placed in the section dedicated to Enlil, but no relation between them is indicated.

While Wilfred G. Lambert proposed in 1980 that Išḫara was sometimes regarded as the wife of Dagan, and this theory is repeated as fact in older reference works such as Jeremy Black's and Anthony Green's Gods, Demons and Symbols of Ancient Mesopotamia, in a more recent study Lluís Feliu arrived at the opposite conclusions. He points out the relation between Išḫara and Dagan is effectively restricted to the royal ceremonies of the Third Dynasty of Ur, and does not recur in other periods, and concludes Išḫara effectively had no husband, though she could be associated with various male deities in specific locations and time periods. Feliu additionally points out that Lambert relying on this assumption also wrongly concluded Išḫara was one and the same as Ḫabūrītum, a goddess who represented the river Khabur who is also attested in association with Dagan in Mesopotamia. He notes that Ḫabūrītum and Išḫara at times appear in the same documents, and cannot be the same deity. This view is also supported by Alfonso Archi. He considers it more likely that Haburitum was analogous to Belet Nagar. Like Feliu, he assumes it is not plausible that Išḫara was ever regarded as Dagan's wife, at least partially because of her Ishtar-like characteristics.

=== Išḫara and Ninkarrak ===
A number of sources attest the existence of a connection between Išḫara and the medicine goddess Ninkarrak, including an Old Assyrian treaty, a curse formula from Emar, and a god list from Mari. Additionally both appear, though not next to each other, in Naram-Sin's treaty with Elam. In An = Anum, the name Meme is applied both to Išḫara and to Ninkarrak.

Joan Goodnick Westenholz assumed that the association between Išḫara and Ninkarrak might have developed due to shared origin in Syria. Irene Sibbing-Plantholt more broadly connects it with both of them being worshiped on the peripheries of Mesopotamia, both in the west and in the east. She also notes that since Ninkarrak was typically associated with dogs, and Išḫara with snakes and scorpions, their functions might have been viewed as complementary.

=== Išḫara and Allani ===
In Hurrian context, as an underworld deity, Išḫara was closely associated with Allani, the queen of the dead. The connection between them is already present in documents from the Ur III period. It might have been in part influenced by an association between Išḫara and the Hurrian primeval deities, which in turn developed due to her own underworld aspect. Veneration of Išḫara and Allani as a pair was an example of a broader phenomenon frequently attested in Hurrian sources, the worship of pairs of deities with similar spheres of influence as dyads, as also attested in the cases of Šauška's attendants Ninatta and Kulitta, the fate goddesses Hutena and Hutellura, Ḫepat and her son Šarruma, or the astral deities Pinikir and DINGIR.GE_{6}, so-called Goddess of the Night.

Volkert Haas suggested that the placement of Išḫara after Arsay in an Ugaritic offering list was a reflection of her association with Allani, as these two goddesses were seemingly regarded as analogous.

== Worship ==
=== Ebla ===
The worship of Išḫara is well attested in sources from various sites from ancient Syria, starting with the texts from Ebla from the third millennium BCE. It represented a tradition deeply rooted in the Eblaite territory, which encompassed the area located between the modern border between Syria and Turkey in the north up to Emesa (Homs) and Qatna in the south, and from Jebel Ansariyah in the west to Emar and the Euphrates in the east. Numerous settlements where Išḫara was worshiped are mentioned in the Eblaite text corpus. She is one of the two deities with the largest number of local hypostases, the other being Resheph, with ten attested for each of them in texts known as of 2020. These included Išḫaras of Aḫadamu, Arugadu, Banaium, Guwalu, Mane, Uguaš, wa-NE-du^{ki}, Zidara, Zitilu and Zuramu. However, only Mane was a city considered significant from the administrative point of view, as it functioned as Ebla's harbor on the Euphrates. While most of these settlements were not a destination of royal pilgrimages, some of them were visited by queens. Such evidence exists for Zuramu, Uguaš and Mane. A journey to these sanctuaries of Išḫara was undertaken by the queen mother Dusigu at one point. All three were under the control of Ebla at the time. Offerings to Išḫara of Zidara made by the queen and various princesses are also attested, though they took place in Ebla itself. A number of references to Išḫara being worshiped in the three cult centers of Hadabal, Arugadu, Hamadu and Luban, have been identified as well. According to Alfonso Archi, in the first of these cities she was venerated in association with Eblaite rulers, as it served as their secondary residence.

"Išḫara of the king", a hypostasis meant to serve as a protector of the reigning Eblaite monarch, was worshiped in the temple of the city god Kura. A statue of the royal hypostasis of Išḫara was placed inside, and she could receive offerings in this building. However, a separate temple dedicated to her existed in Ebla too. Administrative texts indicate that multiple members of the Eblaite royal family and court were devotees of Išḫara. Personal devotion to the royal aspect of Išḫara is best documented among women belonging to the royal house, such as Dusigu, the wife of Irkab-Damu and Kešdutu, a princess who was eventually sent to marry the king of Kish. As an extension of her role in the royal cult, Išḫara was worshiped during rituals connected to weddings of kings. During preparations for it, the future Eblaite queen was expected to make offerings to Išḫara and Kura. The king instead made offerings to her after the return from the ceremony, which took place outside the city. In Darib near Ebla, possibly to be identified with modern Atarib, Išḫara was invoked in connection with the funerary cult of deceased Eblaite kings, alongside a god associated with this locality whose name is not preserved and the divine pairs of Hadabal and his nameless spouse, Resheph and Adamma and Agu and Guladu. A form of Išḫara linked to king Kun-damu was worshiped by his successors. She is still attested as late as thirty years after his death. In addition to such hypostases linked to the royal family, specifically to individual kings and queens mothers, one linked to the vizier Arrukum is also attested. Further hypostases, a pair consisting of "major" (MAḪ) and "minor" (TUR) Išḫaras, are attested in an inventory of weapons.

Both male and female servants (pa_{4}-šeš) of Išḫara are attested in the Eblaite texts.

A single Eblaite document attests that Išḫara was asked to purify the royal garden, though this location was more commonly associated with the local form of the god Ea, Ḥayya. She is also attested in an Eblaite incantation (ARET V 16), which is dedicated to the Balikh River, here treated as a deity and addressed in the plural, the earth (ki), and other local deities, namely Hadda, Ammarik, Adarwan and Kamiš.

With a single exception, Iti-Išḫara (I-ti-^{d}ŠARA_{8}), the name of a messenger (U_{5}) from Irpeš, a city located near the border with the kingdom of Emar, no theophoric names invoking Išḫara are known from the Ebla text corpus. Alfonso Archi considers this to be an example of a broader phenomenon, as with the exception of Kura the deities worshiped in this city who might have originated in a substrate are largely absent from the onomasticon, which might indicate that the name giving patterns in Ebla reflected not the popular religion in the documented period, but rather a more archaic tradition.

Ebla was completely destroyed in the second half of the twenty fourth century BCE, which resulted in the dissolution of the original form of the Eblaite pantheon. However, in contrast with other Eblaite deities Išḫara continued to be worshiped due to being incorporated into various other pantheons across Syria, Mesopotamia and eastern Anatolia. The association between her and Eblaite kingship persisted at least until the seventeenth century BCE. A later king of Ebla, Indilimma, referred to himself as a servant of Išḫara on his personal seal.

=== Other early Syrian sites ===
Išḫara is attested in sources from Nabada, a settlement in the Khabur Triangle which in the period documented in the Eblaite archive was under the control of Nagar. While a month in the local calendar was named after Išḫara, other major deities from the pantheon of Ebla like Kura or Hadabal are entirely absent.

Išḫara was also worshiped in Emar. Alfonso Archi presumes she was already worshiped there in early periods, much like in Ebla, and the evidence from the Emar text corpus, which has been dated to fourteenth and thirteenth centuries BCE, deals with the continuation of her already well established cult. Next to Dagan and ^{d}NIN.URTA she was one of the principal deities of this city. This position has been described as typical for her in the tradition of northern Syria. She was one of the five deities celebrated during the kissu festivals described in texts from Emar, which might have taken place in Šatappi, a settlement located further south. The nature of these celebrations remain uncertain. The kissu was not a part of the religious calendar of the city, and presumably only happened rarely. She was celebrated in it alongside the city god ^{d}NIN.URTA. She is also present in descriptions of the analogous festival dedicated to Dagan, alongside deities such as Shuwala and Ugur. For unknown reasons, Išḫara's status in the local pantheon is seemingly not acknowledged in the instructions for another local festival, zukru, where three of her hypostases – "mistress of the city" (GAŠAN URU.KI), "of the king" (ša LUGAL) and "of the prophetesses" (ša ^{f.meš}mu_{x}-nab-bi-ti) – occur separately from other major deities of the city, among these considered to be of secondary importance. It is known that a shrine dedicated to the first of these forms existed. Išḫara also appears in curses in administrative texts meant to prevent breaking oaths. Curse formulas pair her with deities such as the city god, the weather god, Dagan or Ninkarrak. A text listing various objects tied to the worship of Išḫara and regarded as her property is also known. Multiple theophoric names invoking her have been identified in texts from Emar as well.

Išḫara is one of the deities invoked in a curse formula in an Old Babylonian inscription found in the citadel of Aleppo alongside Dagan, Sin, Nergal and Shamash, but the section focused on her is not preserved.

Numerous theophoric names invoking Išḫara are mentioned in the Mari text corpus, with a total of 34 identified as of 2020. Many of them belonged to women. Overall in feminine names she is the third most frequently occurring goddess. However, in cases where the place of origin of their bearers is specified, usually they are not from the city itself. Examples include Iddin-Išḫara from Barḫān near Saggāratum, Ḫabdu-Išḫara from Dēr (modern Abu Kamal), Tupki-Išḫara from Emar, Išḫara-asīya from Ḫišamta (a city near Terqa), Zū-Išḫara (or possibly Warad-Išḫara) from Tuttul, Išḫara-zamrati from Ya'il, a village located on the border between the districts of Terqa and Saggāratum whose inhabitants are well represented in the textual record, and Išḫara-pilaḫ from Zurubbān, located on the bank of the Euphrates near Terqa and later Dura Europos. Additionally, seven names of deportees from the Upper Khabur area between Sinjar Mountains and Mount Abdulaziz invoke Išḫara, including those of three men, Ḫabdu-Išḫara, Išḫara-malakī and Pandi-Išḫara, and four women, Išḫara-damqa, Išḫara-naḫmī, Išḫara-nērī and Išḫara-ummī. A text from the Asqudum archive from Mari mentions the offering of an ewe to Išḫara.

A selection of similar theophoric names as these known from Mari have been identified in texts from Terqa, Tuttul and Ekalte, though they were less frequent in these cases. Examples from Tuttul include Abdu-Išḫara ("servant of Išḫara"), La-Išḫara ("one belonging to Išḫara") and Zu-Išḫara ("the one of Išḫara").

=== Mesopotamian reception ===
==== Early attestations ====
In the third millennium BCE Išḫara reached Mesopotamia, most likely with Mari serving as the intermediary. She is already mentioned in sources from the Old Akkadian period, though these early attestations are not numerous. She is one of the five Mesopotamian deities mentioned in a treaty between Naram-Sin of Akkad and an Elamite monarch, the other four being Ilaba, Manzat, Ninkarrak and Ninurta. A further early attestation is a love incantation from Tell Ingharra, an archeological site located near Kish.

It is also known that Išḫara was worshiped in the Diyala area. She is already mentioned in an administrative text from the Old Akkadian period dealing with the provisions of oil for her cult in Išur, a city located near Tutub which was under the control of Eshnunna, and in a single theophoric name from Tutub itself, ME-Išḫara. Išḫara of Išur is also referenced in a later treaty between Ibal-pi-El I of Eshnunna, Sîn-kāšid of Uruk and Sin-Iddinam of Larsa, known from an unprovenanced copy, in which an oath formula of the first of these three kings invokes her, Sin, Tishpak and Adad. She was also worshiped in Eshnunna itself and in Tell Ishchali. Old Babylonian texts from the latter site mention a settlement named Dūr-Išḫara, whose location is presently unknown. Išḫara was also likely venerated in Tell Agrab. She is additionally attested in personal names from the Chogha Gavaneh site in western Iran, which in the early second millennium BCE was a predominantly Akkadian settlement possibly connected to the kingdom of Eshnunna.

==== Ur III period ====
Further south in Babylonia Išḫara does not occur before the Ur III period. However, she is well attested in the Puzrish-Dagan archives from the reign of Shulgi onward, and in contemporary texts from Umma. This situation has been described as a case of "reimporting" a foreign goddess already known in Mesopotamia before. Multiple deities introduced to southern Mesopotamia at the time were associated with specific western lands: Išḫara with the area surrounding Ebla, Dagan (and his spouse Shalash) with the middle Euphrates, and Belet Nagar, the goddess of Nagar (Tell Brak), with Khabur. A temple dedicated jointly to Dagan and Išḫara is documented in texts from this period, and while they do not specify its location, other evidence, such as theophoric names of associated officials, indicate it might have been located in Nippur. Another house of worship, which Išḫara shared with Belet Nagar, existed in Ur.

For uncertain reasons, the veneration of Išḫara by the royal family of the Ur III state is particularly well attested. The earliest example is a text from Puzrish-Dagan mentioning offerings made to her, Allatum, Annunitum, Ulmašītum and the pair Belet-Šuḫnir and Belet-Terraban by Shulgi-simti, a wife of Shulgi. She is well documented in the personal archive of this queen. Offerings made to her on behalf of Abī-simtī alongside these aimed at Dagan, Ḫabūrītum or Inanna are also attested. During the reign of Shu-Sin, she received offerings at the royal court in Ur. In the same period, she was worshiped during the erabbatum ceremony, possibly representation occasions when a deity was believed to enter the corresponding temple after a period spent outside it, for example during rituals held in the king's palace. She also seemingly received offerings in Nippur, though the text documenting them is considered atypical due to lack of parallels to the list of deities mentioned in it. All of these documents come from Puzrish-Dagan, which at the time served as a center of distribution of sacrificial animals.

There is no evidence that the worship of Išḫara was widespread in Mesopotamia in the Ur III period. Theophoric names invoking her are uncommon in relevant sources, with the attested examples including NÌ-Išḫara (reading of the first sign is uncertain) identified in a text from Puzrish-Dagan from the reign of Shulgi and a number of separate individuals named Šū-Išḫara, "he of Išḫara". One of them was a representative of Mari who visited the royal court in Ur alongside Ili-Dagan of Ebla during the sixth year of Amar-Sin's reign. Another Šū-Išḫara hailed from Babaz, an otherwise unknown location.

==== Old Assyrian period ====
Transmission of the cult of Išḫara to the north is also attested. She was worshiped by Old Assyrian merchants in Kanesh, though in this context she should be understood as a Mesopotamian, rather than Anatolian, deity. A temple dedicated to her existed in the city. She received regular offerings in it. One text mentions that two figures of wild bulls were sent to Kanesh for Išḫara and Ishtar. However, references to her are not common in the texts from the karum. It has been noted that no evidence had been found for her functioning as the family deity of any of its inhabitants. Some of the texts from Kanesh mention a priestess bearing the theophoric name Ummī-Išhara, who was a daughter of one of the traders, though she resided in Assur rather than in the karum.

In a treaty between Assyria and a king of Apum, Till-abnu (reigned in the middle of the eighteenth century BCE) from Tell Leilan (Shubat-Enlil), Išḫara appears as one of the divine witnesses. It is not certain with which of these two states she is linked in this context. She was also worshiped in Chagar Bazar (Ašnakkum) while this site was under Assyrian control, as attested in texts from the reign of Shamshi-Adad I. Three names invoking her have been identified in sources from this site: Ḫazip-Išḫara, Ibbi-Išḫara and Išḫara-šemēt. According to Volkert Haas Tell al-Rimah was seemingly the northeastern limit of the extent of her cult in Mesopotamia, as evidenced by sources from this site which mention "Išḫara of Artanya". This hypostasis is attested in a text describing offerings made to her, Ishtar of Ninêt and Ishtar of Qattara by a certain Iltani. Neither this hypostasis of Išḫara not the associated settlement are known from any other sources.

==== Old Babylonian period ====
Išḫara also continued to be worshiped in Babylonia after the fall of the Ur III state, through the Old Babylonian period. One of the earliest pieces of evidence is an offering list from Nippur from the reign of Warad-Sin of Larsa. A temple of Išḫara is mentioned in a text from Larsa dated to the reign of Hammurabi, but its location is unspecified. She was also worshiped in Kish and near it, possibly in Ilip or Harbidum, as attested by references to a temple and a number of theophoric names. Another temple dedicated to her existed in Sippar. Offering lists from this city mention her too. A legal text refers to an oath sworn by the snake (ba-aš-mu-um) of Išḫara. The formula "servant of Išḫara" occurs in an inscription on a seal of a certain Illuratum. Multiple theophoric names invoking her have been identified in texts from Sippar, for example Abdu-Išḫara ("servant of Išḫara"), Malik-Išḫara ("Išḫara is an advisor") or Nūr-Išḫara ("light of Išḫara"). Theophoric names invoking her are also attested in Old Babylonian texts from Dilbat, but they are uncommon in this corpus. Evidence from Ur is similarly limited to theophoric names. At some point, possibly also in the Old Babylonian period, Išḫara was also presumably worshiped in Kisurra, as an incantation known from a Neo-Assyrian copy refers to her as the queen of this city (šar-rat ki-sur-ri-e^{ki}).

==== Late attestations ====
The number of theophoric names invoking Išḫara declined after the Old Babylonian period. She appears in three in the text corpus from Nippur from the Kassite period. Two of them, Rabâ-(epšētu-)ša-Išḫara, "great are (the deeds) of Išḫara" and Išḫara-šarrat, "Išḫara is queen", occur in texts dated to the reign of Nazi-Maruttash. She is also referenced in a number of inscriptions on kudurru, inscribed boundary stones, as first attested during the reign of Meli-Shipak. One such object from the reign of Nazi-Maruttash mentions her in an explanation of symbols used to decorate the stones. Another kudurru inscription invoking her has been dated to the reign of Marduk-nādin-aḫḫē, but its provenance is unknown. An inscription of Adad-nirari I mentions the rebuilding of a chapel of Išḫara inside E-me-Inanna, "house of the me of Inanna", the temple of Ishtar-Aššuritu in Assur. Its own ceremonial name is unknown.

In the first millennium BCE, Mesopotamia was the only area where Išḫara continued to be worshiped, with attestations available from both Assyria and Babylonia. The so-called Götteradressbuch, a late Assyrian text, indicates that in Assur she was venerated in the temple of Ea. The sources pertaining to the tākultu ritual place her among the deities associated with the temple of Adad and Anu in Assur. A šuillakku prayer to Išḫara belonged to a series dedicated to "great of sublime goddesses" (ištarāte rabâte u ṣīrāte), a part of which has been discovered in the temple of Nabu in Nimrud, though a reference to her only occurs in a catchline in the end of the recovered tablet briefly describing the contents of the presently lost next part. She was also worshiped in the city of Babylon, though this constituted a late development. She nonetheless had her own temple there. It bore the ceremonial name Ešasurra, "house of the womb", and according to Andrew R. George can be identified with the building designated as "temple Z" during excavations. It is only known from topographical texts and a single administrative tablet. A street named after Išḫara might have existed in the same city. A cultic calendar indicates that she continued to be worshiped in Babylon in the Hellenistic period.

Išḫara is also attested in Seleucid sources from Uruk, though she is absent from earlier Neo-Babylonian texts from the same location. It has been pointed out that she is mentioned in a description of the customs of Uruk in the Old Babylonian version of the Epic of Gilgamesh, but her role in the contemporary religious life of the city is uncertain. In the Seleucid period she was seemingly worshiped in the temple of Bēlet-īli. According to Julia Krul she was presumably introduced to the local pantheon in the late first millennium BCE due to her well attested connection with Ishtar documented in god lists, similarly to Ninsianna.

=== Hurrian reception ===
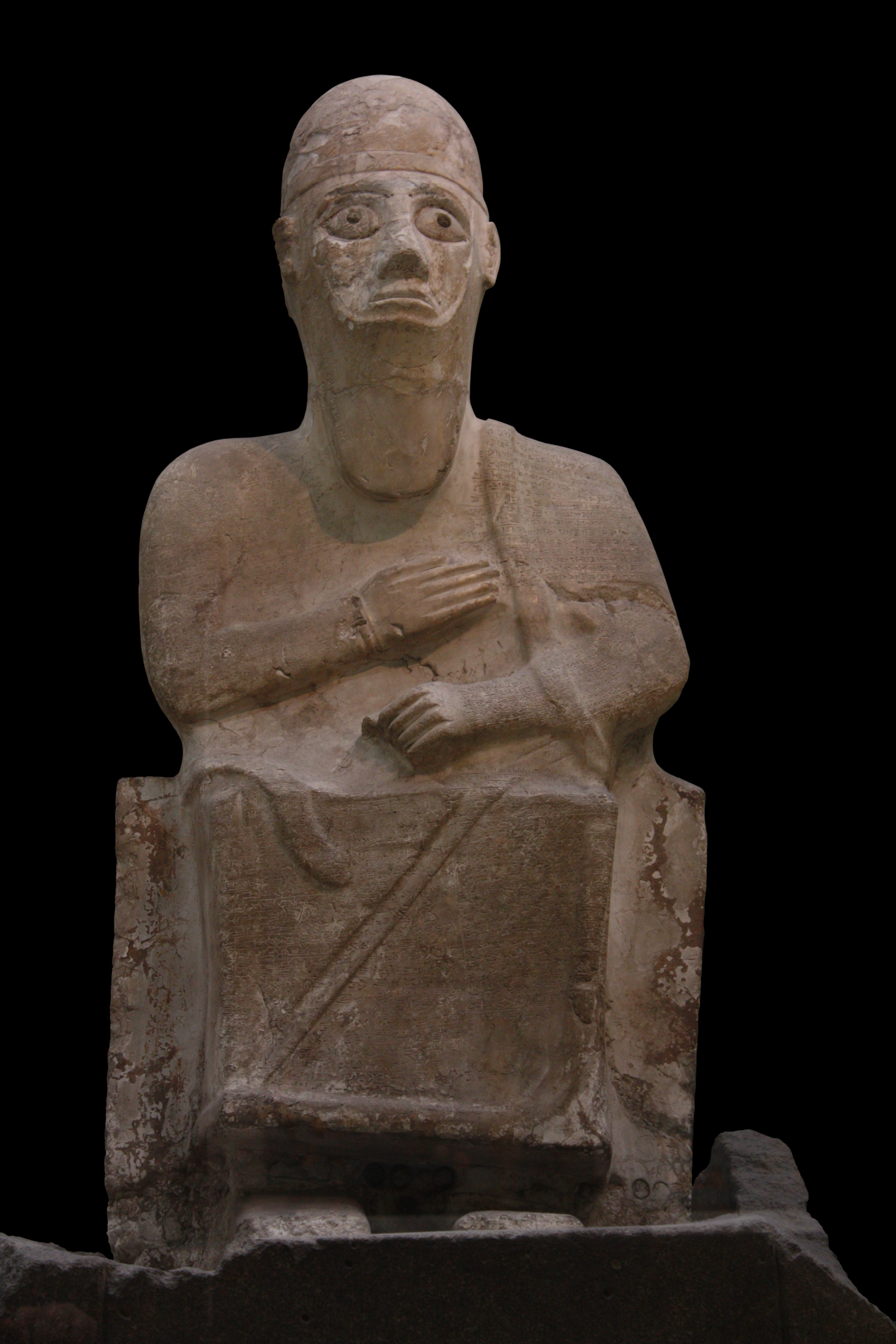
Statue of king Idrimi of Alalakh, whose inscriptions designate Išḫara as the "lady" of his city.

Due to being worshiped in many locations in Syria in the third and second millennia BCE, Išḫara was also incorporated into the Hurrian pantheon. She appears in standard offering lists (kaluti) of Ḫepat, between Hutena-Hutellura and Allani. She is listed among Hurrian deities worshiped in the Mitanni Empire in the Šattiwaza treaty, where she is placed after Damkina. She was also venerated in Mardaman, east of the Tigris. A further location where she is attested in Hurrian context is Alalakh, a Hurrianized city in western Syria. She was called the "Lady of Alalakh", as indicated by an inscription of king Idrimi. According to Piotr Taracha, she was the third most important deity in the pantheon of that city, after the storm god (Teshub) and the sun god (Šimige). However, the oldest evidence for the veneration of Išḫara in this city, dated from the Old Babylonian period, is limited to theophoric names. Most of them are Hurrian, for example Eḫli-Išḫara ("Išḫara saves"), Ewri-Išḫara ("Išḫara is king"), Taki-Išḫara ("Išḫara is beautiful") and Wanti-Išḫara (meaning unknown), though Ummī-Išḫara ("my mother is Išḫara") is an exception. A reference to a SANGA priest in her service, a certain Tulpiya, is also known.

==== Kizzuwatna ====
The Hurrian traditions pertaining to the worship of Išḫara were part of the religion of the kingdom of Kizzuwatna. According to Volkert Haas she was its most important goddess. She is best attested in association with the areas surrounding Tarša (Tarsus) and Neriša. A mountain named after Išḫara existed in the proximity of the latter city, and a temple dedicated to her was located on it. She was also venerated in Kummanni. A local king, Talzu, contributed to the spread of the cult of her hypostasis linked to the city of Neriša, and additionally assigned fields in various villages to her clergy, which was a privilege later reaffirmed by his successor Šunaššura and then by Hittite kings when Kizzuwatna became a part of the Hittite Empire.

Buildings referred to as ḫamri were associated with Išḫara, and she could accordingly be described as ḫamrawann(i)-, "inhabitant of ḫamri". Hittite texts also preserve the form Ḫamrišḫara, which does not follow usual rules of Hittite inflection and as such is likely to be a loan from Akkadian, to be understood as "ḫamri of Išḫara". The etymology of the term ḫamri is uncertain, and while both Hurrian and Amorite origin has been proposed for it, it might have instead originated in a linguistic substrate at some point spoken in Upper Mesopotamia. Buildings designated by this term are mentioned in Anatolian texts written in Hurrian, Luwian and Hittite, but their earliest attestations go back to Upper Mesopotamia and northern Babylonia in the early second millennium BCE. They functioned as an institution connected to swearing oaths, rather than as temples of specific deities. Different deities were linked to them in different areas, with various weather gods, Ashur and possibly Shamash attested in addition to Išḫara.

The worship of Išḫara in Kizzuwatna involved priestesses designated by the akkadogram ĒNTU. It was read in this context as katra or katri, and the women designated by it were otherwise only involved in the worship of the so-called "Goddess of the Night", a Hurrian deity whose name was always written logographically and as such remains uncertain. Another class of clergy of Išḫara were the išḫaralli priestesses, who were not associated with any other deities. They were involved in funerary rituals.

Išḫara was also one of the three main goddesses venerated during the ḫišuwa festival, the other two being Lelluri and Maliya. During this celebration, which was meant to guarantee good fortune for the royal couple, she received offerings alongside "Teshub Manuzi," Lelluri, Allani, two hypostases of Nupatik (pibithi – "of Pibid(a)" and zalmathi – "of Zalman(a)/Zalmat") and Maliya. Instructions for this celebration prescribe covering the statue of Išḫara with a red draped garment, while that of Allani with an identical blue one. Another Kizzuwatnean festival, dedicated specifically to Išḫara, took place in autumn.

==== Ugarit ====
Išḫara was one of the Hurrian deities worshiped in Ugarit. An incantation from this site written in Hurrian but using the local alphabetic script (RS 24.285 = KTU^{3} 1.131) is focused on her and invokes her to

guard the land (as far as) poplar-filled Emar to Ṣiyurašše, Mudkin to Nirabe, Yabla to Alliše, Naštarbi to Šidurašše, Tunanab to Šaydar, (and) Ugarit to Zulude!

All of the toponyms listed appear to be pairs consisting of a city located on the Euphrates and another close to the Mediterranean coast, and on this basis Jacob Lauinger proposes that the intent might be to delineate the borders of the former kingdom of Yamhad. The only exceptions are Ugarit and Zulude, both of which were located in the west. Piotr Taracha presumes Išḫara was worshiped in all of the listed settlements. A further Ugaritic text mentioning her is RS 24.261, which focuses on local Ashtart and her Hurrian counterpart Šauška and combines Ugaritic and Hurrian elements. It prescribes making an offering to Išḫara between these meant for Hutellura and Allani.

In addition to appearing in Hurrian sources from Ugarit, Išḫara was also firmly integrated into the strictly local pantheon. In the standard Ugaritic list of deities, known from multiple copies both in the local script and in standard syllabic cuneiform, presumed to record the prescribed order of sacrifices, she appears in the twenty fourth position, after Arsay and before Ashtart. Another similar text places her before Gaṯaru and after a deity whose name is not preserved. In RS 24.643, an account of rituals which seemingly took place in the two months following the winter solstice, enumerates various deities who should receive a sacrificial ram each during them, among them Išḫara. RS 1.001, a ritual taking place over the course of a day and the following night which was the first text discovered during the excavations at the site of Ugarit (Ras Shamra), prescribes the offering of a cow to her at night, after a similar sacrifice made to Ilu-Bêti, the "god of the house", who also precedes her in the list RS 24.246, the first fourteen lines of which appear to match the order of deities mentioned in RS 1.001. Dennis Pardee argues that Ilu-Bêti was the tutelary deity of the royal palace and the royal family, and suggests identifying him with Hadad.

=== Hittite reception ===
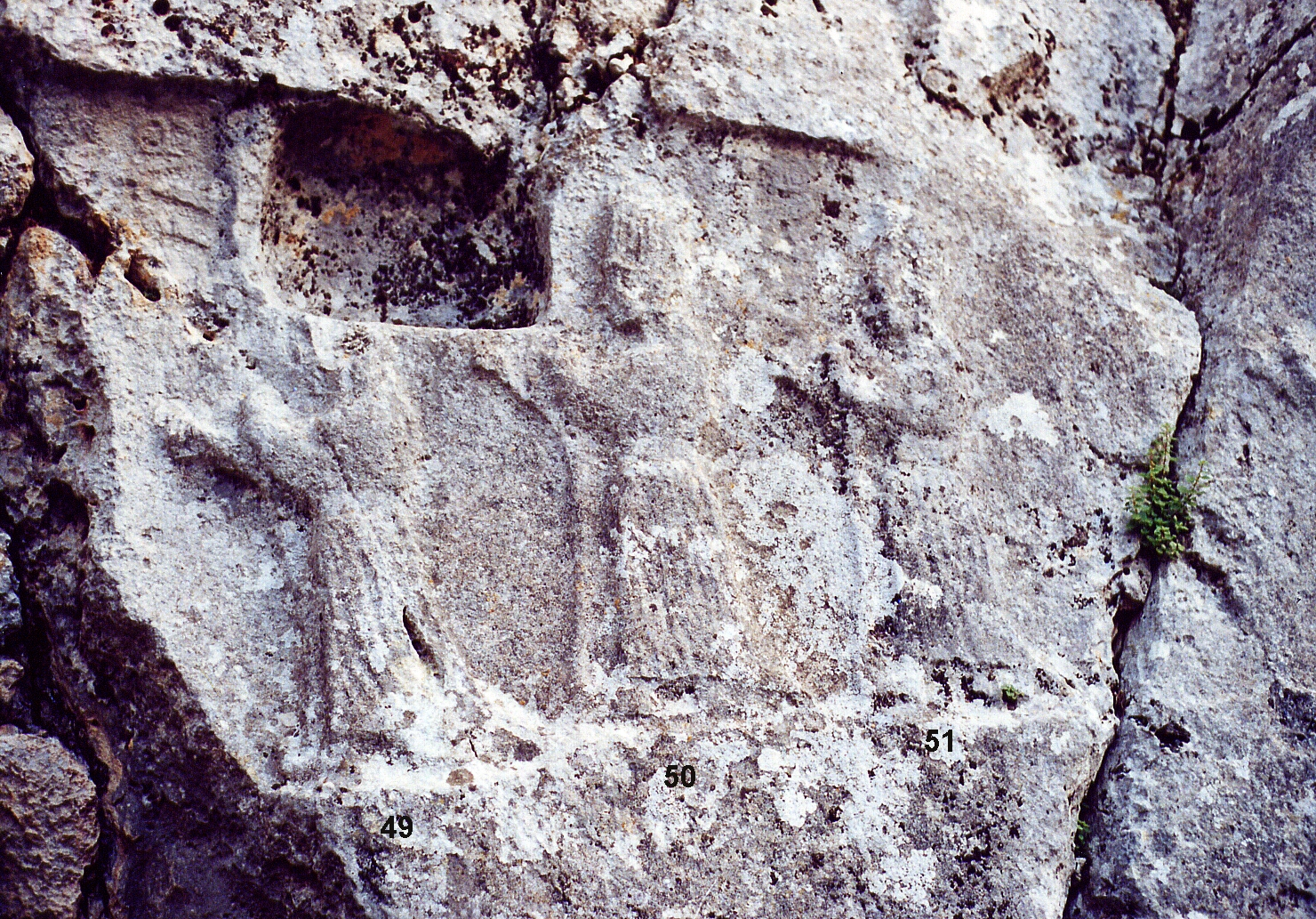
Išḫara on the Yazılıkaya reliefs, depicted between Allani and Nabarbi.

Išḫara was also incorporated into Hittite religion. Individual traditions pertaining to her were received from Kizzuwatna, Mukiš (Alalakh and its surroundings) and Aštata (Emar and territory controlled by it). For example, a festival was received from Surun, a city located to the north of Ekalte in Aštata. The oldest evidence dates to the sixteenth century BCE, and there is no indication that Išḫara was worshiped in Anatolia earlier by communities other than the Old Assyrian traders in Kanesh.

As a guardian of oaths, Išḫara appears in a standard enumeration of deities in Hittite treaties. Military oaths were particularly closely associated with her.

Išḫara is likely among the deities depicted in the Yazılıkaya sanctuary, where she appears between Allani and Nabarbi in a procession of goddesses following Ḫepat whose order mirrors the Hurrian kaluti of this goddess.

== Mythology ==
=== Mesopotamian myths ===
The Epic of Gilgamesh and Atrahasis both mention Išḫara in passing as a goddess of marriage. She is mentioned in a fragment of an Old Babylonian version of the former, the so-called "Pennsylvania Tablet", which reportedly has been discovered in Larsa. The reference is also present in the later Standard Babylonian version (tablet II, line 109). Thorkild Jacobsen argued that it describes Gilgamesh's attempt to marry her, which he considered a reflection of a hieros gamos custom. However, this interpretation has been criticized by Andrew R. George, who concludes the "bed of Išḫara" mentioned in it was presumably a literary term referring to a bed in which a marriage was consummated, and should not be treated as a reference to a sacred marriage rite, especially since the role of Išḫara in the pantheon of Uruk is uncertain. In Atrahasis, she is invoked during preparations for a wedding.

=== Hurrian myths ===
Išḫara appears in a myth known from an original Hurrian version and a Hittite translation, known as the Epic of Freeing or Song of Release, discovered in Hattusa in 1983, with further fragments recovered in 1985. While the Hittite version shows grammatical features typical for the fifteenth and fourteenth centuries BCE, the Middle Hittite period, the Hurrian original is more archaic and it is presumed the composition was inspired by events which originally took place in the seventeenth century, after the kingdom of Yamhad was weakened due to the growth of Hurrian and Hittite influence in the region. Išḫara is introduced in the proemium alongside Allani, with both of them being referred to as "young woman" (Hurrian: šiduri). Išḫara is also addressed as "wordmaker, famous for her wisdom". However, she only appears in one more passage. While the text is bilingual, this section, which describes a meeting between her and Teshub, is only preserved in the Hurrian version, with its Hittite translation now lost. Teshub apparently threatens to destroy Ebla because the Eblaites refuse to free the inhabitants of the city Igingalliš. He discusses this matter with Išḫara because she was understood as the main goddess of Ebla. It is presumed she tries to protect it. The narrative as a whole is most likely an etiological explanation of the historical destruction of Ebla.

Išḫara also appears in the proemium of the Song of Kumarbi, part of a Hurrian cycle of myths about the eponymous god, as one of the deities invited to listen to narrator's tale.
