= Goddess of the Night (Hurrian) =

Hurrian goddess from Kizzuwatna

DINGIR.GE_{6}
- "Goddess of the Night"
- Major cult center: Kizzuwatna, Šamuḫa, Laḫḫurama

Goddess of the Night (Sumerian: 𒀭𒈪, DINGIR.GE_{6}) was a deity worshiped in the Hurrian kingdom of Kizzuwatna, and later also in Šamuḫa in the Hittite Empire. Only the logographic writing of her name is known, and multiple attempts at identifying her have been made. Most researchers assume that she was at least partially similar to goddesses such as Ishtar, Šauška and Išḫara. She most likely represented the night sky, and was also associated with dreaming.

Known texts indicate that the Goddess of the Night was closely associated with Pinikir, an astral goddess of Elamite origin also worshiped by the Hurrians. They appear together in the same rituals, including a well-preserved text dealing with the preparations of a new temple of the Goddess of the Night.

== Name ==
The name of the Goddess of the Night (alternatively the Deity of the Night) is conjectural, as only the logographic writing is known. The most common writing, DINGIR.GE_{6}, uses exclusively Sumerian signs, but variants with Akkadian complementation, DINGIR-LUM GE_{6}-ŠI and DINGIR-LIM GE_{6}, as well as a mixed Sumero-Akkadian writing, DINGIR-LIM MU-ŠI, are also known. No phonetic writings are attested. The gender of the deity designated by this name was only possible to establish due to the fact she is described wearing typically feminine headwear and a single instance where a distinct feminine form of an Akkadian verb is used to address her.

Early researchers, starting with Hans Ehelolf in 1936, assumed that the deity represented by the logogram DINGIR.GE_{6} should be understood as a "black god" or "black goddess." This view was still accepted as late as in 1989. It led to a number of now discarded proposals regarding the nature of DINGIR.GE_{6}, including an attempt at relating her to an epithet of Aphrodite Urania from Cyprus, melania, "the black," attested in Roman sources from the time of Sulla.

The correct reading was first established by Onofrio Carruba in 1968, though it was not instantly adopted by other authors. It was subsequently confirmed by the discovery of alternate spellings clarifying that GE_{6} represents the word "night," rather than any other readings of the same cuneiform sign, leading to the modern consensus.

== Proposed identification ==
The origin and identity of the Goddess of the Night are a matter of scholarly debate. Piotr Taracha considers her a deity of Hurrian origin. Gary Beckman suggests that it is possible ritual texts related to her, as well as these dealing with Kumarbi and the so-called "Former Gods," have their origin in "Sumero-Hurrian" culture of northern Syria and the "transtigridian" area of the late third and early second millennium BCE. Jared L. Miller presumes that she originated in Kizzuwatna. He argues that no other deity representing the night is known from Syria or Mesopotamia, with the exception of the poetic phrase "gods of the night" (ilū mušīti or ilānī mušīti) which referred to stars and planets. However, a deity named Mušītu (written in cuneiform as ^{d}mu-šī-tu_{4} or ^{d}mu-šī-ti), "night," was worshiped in Emar in association with Saggar. Since she appears in a Hurrian ritual, Alfonso Archi considers it possible her name was a mistaken writing of an unrelated theonym, Mušuni, "order." According to Frans Wiggermann, in Mesopotamian texts night (Akkadian: mušītu) could be sporadically personified and was described as a "veiled bride," but the word even in this context was not accompanied by the dingir sign denoting divinity. Daniel Schwemer nonetheless argues that she should be considered a deity. In one case the personified night occurs alongside deities such as Ea and the Sebitti in a ritual for dream incubation. She is also mentioned in Maqlû, and an ancient commentary on this work identifies her with Gula. A further fragment might suggest the identification between the Mesopotamian personified night and Ishtar, but the restoration is uncertain.

René Lebrun proposed in 1976 proposed that the Goddess of the Night is to be identified with the ^{d}IŠTAR of Šamuḫa (sometimes referred to as "Šauška of Šamuḫa"). This view was subsequently also adopted by Gary Beckman, who points out that calling the Goddess of the Night the "^{d}IŠTAR of Šamuḫa " would be similar to referring to the well attested phenomenon of calling Šauška the "^{d}IŠTAR of Nineveh." According to Jared R. Miller this view is commonly accepted by other modern researchers. However, he does not consider this theory convincing himself. He remarks that it is not impossible there was already an Ishtar hypostasis ( Ishtar of Tamininga) in Šamuḫa before Goddess of the Night was brought to that city from Kizzuwatna by either Tudhaliya I or Tudhaliya II.) He argues it is not impossible that it was this goddess who came to known as the Ishtar of Šamuḫa, and that the Goddess of the Night and Ishtar of Šamuḫa were worshiped separately from each other instead of being two interchangeable names of one goddess. Beate Pongratz-Leisten also considers Goddess of the Night and the deity of Šamuḫa to be separate. A proposal that the Goddess of the Night was the astral aspect of the Mesopotamian Ishtar, or the planet Venus, gained some traction in scholarship, but no direct evidence is available in favor of this view, and it remains uncertain if Ishtar, her hypostases and related deities were actually understood as astral deities in Bronze Age Anatolia. Piotr Taracha similarly identifies Goddess of the Night with Pinikir. However, this view is not supported by other researchers. In offering lists, they can appear side by side as separate deities.

In the 1970s it has been suggested that the Hittite deities Išpanzašepa or Išpanza known from other documents might correspond to the Goddess of the Night. Išpanzasepa, whose name means "genius of the night," was worshiped by the Hittites during the KI.LAM festival and formed a pair with a moon deity, most likely Arma, in it, while Išpant, "night," was among the deities associated with Kanesh in Hittite texts. Piotr Taracha considers these two figures to be related. However, the view that either of them was the same as the Goddess of the Night is doubted, chiefly because the position of the latter in the pantheon of Kizzuwatna was relatively high, while the former belonged to the category of minor deities.

In the Late Hittite period in some cases the same logographic writing, DINGIR.GE_{6}, could represent the Luwian moon god Arma, for example in the writing of a number of theophoric names, in which ^{d}30 (Arma) might alternate with DINGIR.GE_{6}. While the assumption that it means these two deities are identical is present in some older publications, it is unlikely that the Goddess of the Night was confused with him or shared his lunar character, as no known hypostasis of Ishtar (or similar goddesses) was associated with the moon.

While Ahmet Ünan concluded that Goddess of the Night (who he refers to as the "Goddess of Darkness" instead) was a form of Lamashtu, and describes her as possessing "thoroughly demonic traits," this view found no acceptance among other researchers. Richard H. Beal criticizes it as rooted in an incorrect interpretation of a fragmentary text (KUB 55.24), which deals with a nightmare merely experienced in a temple of the Goddess of the Night, which is unlikely to describe the goddess herself on the account of her character as a "respectable deity." Jared R. Miller agrees with this position as well, and points out that Beal's assumption would match what is known about other similar texts describing dream omens.

== Character and iconography ==
Goddess of the Night was most likely understood as a divine representation of the night sky. She was also associated with dreaming. It is also possible she was regarded as a chthonic deity, as she was sometimes invoked through ritual pits (abi).

According to ritual texts, the Goddess of the Night was believed to wear a white or red kureššar, a type of shawl commonly worn as head-wear by Hittite women. Together with the use of Akkadian signs representing a second person feminine form of the verb "to love" (tarâmī) in a passage referring to her sympathy for specific locations this fact is regarded as proof that she was a goddess rather than a god. However, while addressed as female, in the same text she receives both feminine and masculine sets of clothing, which according to Jared L. Miller might point to a partially ambiguous identity. Richard H. Beal suggests that they indicate the goddess was presumed to crossdress. Gary Beckman notes that "ambiguous gender identification" was sometimes a characteristic of the category of Ishtar-like goddesses, to which according to him the Goddess of the Night belonged.

In addition to the aforementioned articles of clothing, a text dealing with creation of a new temple for Goddess of the Night enumerates a variety of objects a new statue of her had to be equipped with: multiple brooches made out of silver and iron (at the time regarded as a precious metal), ivory combs, musical instruments, a bronze basin used to "bathe" her, stools, tables, and woolen tapestries in five colors meant to provide the statue with privacy when necessary. The statue itself had to be made out of gold encrusted with a variety of precious and semi-precious stones such as carnelian, lapis, alabaster and "Babylon stone" (cast glass). The statue's navel and a pair of purka (an unidentified body part) were apparently separate, also golden, objects. She was also to be accompanied by a golden disk representing Pinikir. Gary Beckman notes that it is likely many cult images were much less complex than this depiction of Goddess of the Night must have been.

== Associations with other deities ==
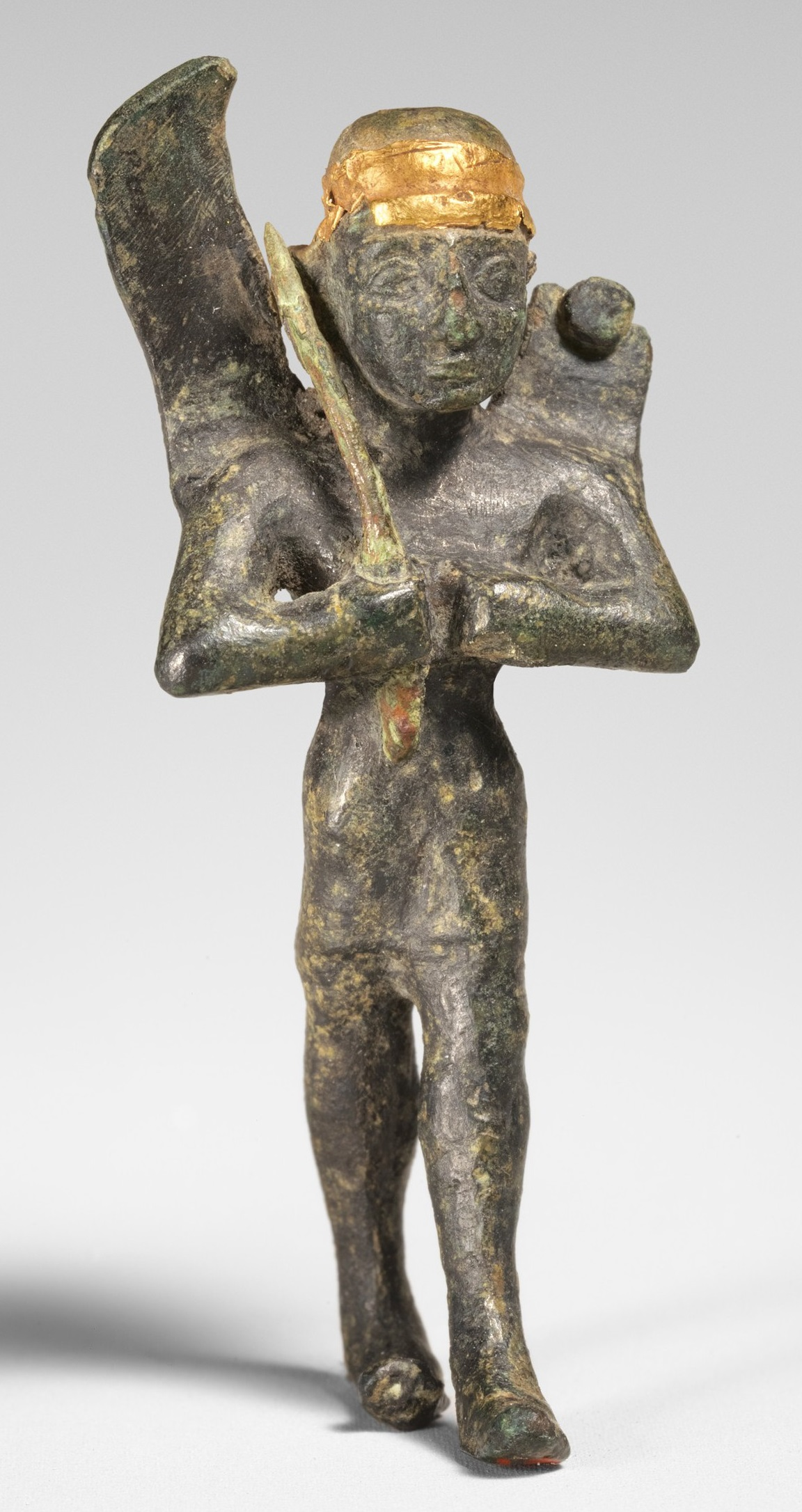
A figurine of Pinikir, a deity closely associated with the Goddess of the Night.

Much of the available evidence indicates that Goddess of the Night was associated in some way with Ishtar. For example, a Hittite oracular text lists two hypostases of Goddess of the Night among various hypostases of Ishtar, and contains a question asking if "any Ishtars" are angry. An invocation from a ritual text focused on the Goddess of the Night list cult centers of Ishtar (Agade, Babylon and Hursagkalama, an alternate name of Kish). It has been pointed out that the list of cities preserved in this ritual, as well as the information about the worship of Pinikir contained in it, most likely indicates that the scholarly tradition of Kizzuwatna involved the transfer of Mesopotamian knowledge. Possibly the compilers had access to an earlier document similar to the Canonical Temple List from the Kassite period. However, it cannot necessarily be assumed that all of the traits of the Goddess of the Night were identical with these of Ishtar.

In addition to Ishtar, the Goddess of the Night has also been compared to Hurrian Šauška. However, a notable difference between them in known ritual texts is the fact that the former was never associated with Nineveh. A number of similarities between the Goddess of the Night and Išḫara have been pointed out too, chiefly their shared association with the underworld and with Ishtar.

=== Goddess of the Night and Pinikir ===
Goddess of the Night was particularly closely associated with Pinikir, an Elamite goddess who was also worshiped by Hurrians. She was viewed as a personification of Venus, and as such was associated with Ishtar. A god list from Emar equates her with Ninsianna. Goddess of the Night and Pinikir seemingly functioned as a dyad. The worship of duos of deities with similar domains (for example Allani and Išḫara or Ninatta and Kulitta) as if they were one was a common feature of Hurrian religion. In a ritual preceding her transfer to a new temple, Goddess of the Night is summoned from cities associated with Ishtar, but also from locations where Pinikir was worshiped (Susa, Elam). A golden disk attached to the back of a statue of Goddess of the Night in the same ritual likely represented Pinikir. The statue and the gold disc together can be interpreted as a "rendering of night sky with its luminaries." According to the same text, Pinikir received a keldi (so-called "goodwill offering") identical to that dedicated to the Goddess of the Night, though located on the roof rather than on the temple. In another text, which deals with ritual purification, the same rites were performed for them both.

== Worship ==
The Goddess of the Night was worshiped in Kizzuwatna. Various members of clergy dedicated to her are attested in known texts, including SANGA priests, two of whom, Ilī-ma-abī and Ulippi are known by name. Additionally, the term katra or katri denoted a class of clergy involved in the worship of both of this goddess (as well as Išḫara). One katra known by name was Arazakiti. She apparently was a co-author of one of the ritual texts pertaining to the Goddess of the Night.

During the reign of either Tudḫaliya I or Tudḫaliya II, the Goddess of the Night was also introduced to Hittite lands, where the city of Šamuḫa, most likely located near modern Sivas, became her new cult center. She was also worshiped in Laḫḫurama.

A well-known text, the Expansion of the Goddess of the Night, describes in detail the transfer of this deity to a new temple. It is considered to be one of the best preserved Hittite rituals. The procedure began with the construction of a new temple and the fashioning of a new statue and its paraphernalia. After they were finished, purification water from the original temple had to be brought to the new one and was kept on its roof for a day. The goddess herself was summoned from various locations, and a string representing the path she had to take to reach her new dwelling had to be tied to the statue after the completion of this part of the preparations. In addition to the Goddess of the Night, the closely associated Pinikir also had to receive offerings during them.
