= Lelluri =

Hurrian mountain goddess

- Mountain goddess
- Major cult center: Haššuwa

Genealogy
- Spouse: Manuzi

Equivalents
- Mesopotamian: Ninmena

Lelluri (also spelled Lilluri, Liluri) was a Hurrian goddess worshiped in southeastern Anatolia and northern Syria. She was associated with mountains, and in known sources appears in connection with the god Manuzi.

== Character ==
Lelluri most likely originated in the Nur Mountains, and her name ends with the Hurrian suffix -luri, known also from the theonyms Upelluri (a primordial giant from the Kumarbi Cycle), and Impaluri (sukkal of the sea god), as well as a number of Hurrian mountain and stone names. Assyriologist Beate Pongratz-Leisten regards her as a deity "associated with Hurrian identity." Volkert Haas describes Lelluri as "lady of the mountains" ("die Herrin der Gebirge").

She was closely linked with Manuzi, a god associated with both the weather and mountains. She was likely his partner, and that they shared a temple in Kummani.

A lexical text from Emar indicates that she was understood as analogous to the Mesopotamian goddess Ninmena.

== Worship ==
According to Volkert Haas, Lelluri was worshiped chiefly in the proximity of Nur Mountains and Orontes River in the west and as far east as the middle of the Euphrates. In Kizzuwatna she was celebrated during the hišuwa festival, whose purpose was to guarantee the wellbeing of the king and his family. Among the other deities present in texts pertaining to it are "Teshub Manuzi" (weather god of [Mt.] Manuzi) Ishara, Allani, Maliya and two hyposthases of Nupatik. During the festival, the formula "Lelluri has achieved her heart's desire" had to be recited aloud after pouring an offering for her into a rhyton. A so-called ambašši offering to her consisted out of a lamb, a goose, a sheep and a loaf of bread.

Like the so-called "Syrian substrate" deities (Ishara, Kubaba, Aštabi, Adamma), Hebat and Šarruma Lelluri was also incorporated into Hittite religion. King Ḫattušili I mentions her (alongside Allatum, the storm god of Aleppo, and the mountain gods Adalur and Amaruk) among the deities whose statues he brought to Hatti as war booty. However, the exact location of the city of Haššuwa from which she was brought remains unknown.
