= Allani =

Hurrian goddess of the underworld

- Queen of the underworld
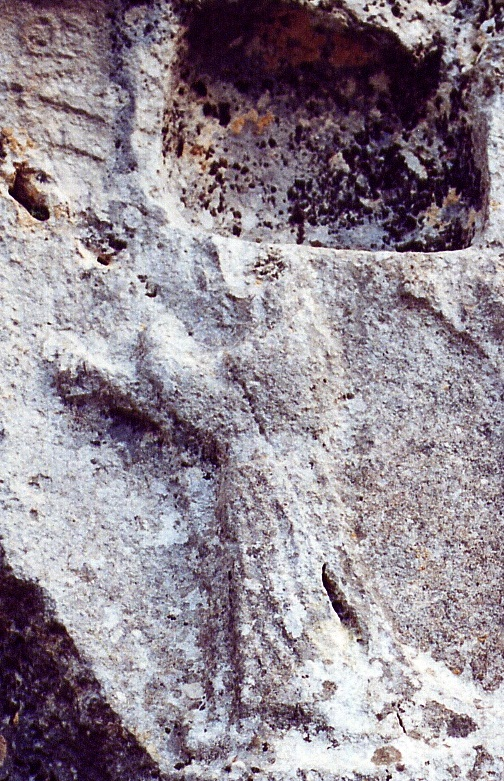
- A relief of Allani ("Allatum") from Yazılıkaya.
- Other names: Allatu, Allatum, Allanitum
- Major cult center: possibly Ḫaššum or Zimudar
- Abode: a palace in the "Dark Earth" (Hurrian underworld)

Equivalents
- Mesopotamian: Ereshkigal
- Hittite/Luwian: Sun goddess of the Earth
- Hattian: Lelwani
- Ugaritic: Arsay

Allani, also known under the Akkadian name Allatu (or Allatum), was the Hurrian goddess of the underworld. She was also associated with the determination of fate. She was closely linked with Išḫara, and they could be invoked or receive offerings together. She also developed connection with other underworld deities from neighboring cultures, such as Mesopotamian Ereshkigal (who eventually came to be equated with her), Anatolian Sun goddess of the Earth and Lelwani, and possibly Ugaritic Arsay. It is presumed she was chiefly worshiped in western areas inhabited by the Hurrians, though the location of her main cult center is uncertain. She is attested in texts from sites such as Tigunani, Tuttul and Ugarit. She was also incorporated into the Mesopotamian pantheon, and was venerated in Ur, Nippur and Sippar. Hittite sources mentioning her are known too.

== Name ==
The theonym Allani has Hurrian origin and consists of the word allai, lady, and the article -ni. It has been noted that simple epithet-like theonyms were common in Hurrian tradition, another well attested example being Šauška, "the great". In texts written in the Ugaritic alphabetic script, Allani's name was rendered as aln. The Akkadian form is Allatum. In 1980 Wilfred G. Lambert proposed that Allatum, who he understood as the same deity as Ereshkigal in origin, was the feminine counterpart, and possibly wife, of a minor Mesopotamian god associated with the underworld, Alla. (Note: Alla was worshiped in Esagi, a settlement whose location remains unknown, and he is also attested as the sukkal (attendant deity) of Ningishzida.) However, Gernot Wilhelm already stated in 1989 that no convincing Akkadian etymology has been proposed for the name Allatum, and it is now agreed that it was a derivative of Allani. Alfonso Archi suggests this form of the name originally developed in Syria, and from there reached Mesopotamia. In Emar, an ancient city in Syria, both forms were used. A further variant, Allantum, is attested in texts from Tigunani. It differs from the usual variant Allatum, but also represents a combination of the base Hurrian name with the Akkadian feminine suffix.

== Character ==
Allani was regarded as the queen of the underworld in Hurrian religion. According to Hurrian texts, she resided in a palace at the gate of the "Dark Earth" (Hurrian: timri eže), the land of the dead. As an extension of this role she was also one of the deities who took part in the determining of fates of mortals. She could be referred to with the title "the bolt of the earth", negri ešeniwe. (Note: It has been noted the term negri could also designate a border or a riverbank.) This epithet reflected her association with the underworld, with the word "earth" functioning as a euphemism. Another title applied to her was šiduri, "young woman". She was accordingly imagined to have had a youthful appearance. As indicated by texts pertaining to the ḫišuwa festival, she was believed to wear a blue garment, with the color presumably being associated with death.

== Association with other deities ==
Like two other of the most commonly worshiped Hurrian goddesses, Išḫara and Shaushka, Allani was regarded as unmarried. A single text mentions a "daughter of Allatum", which according to Volkert Haas constitutes the only reference to this goddess having children. Piotr Taracha identifies the daughter in mention as Ḫepat, but according to Lluis Feliu, it is possible Shalash was considered her mother.

An association between Allani and Hurrian primeval deities is also attested. This group was believed to dwell in the underworld.

=== Allani and other Hurrian goddesses ===
Allani was often invoked alongside Išḫara, who also was associated with the underworld in Hurrian religion. The connection between these two goddesses is already present in documents from the Ur III period. In the ritual of Allaituraḫi, Allani is invoked alongside Išḫara to protect a household from demonic forces. Instructions for the ḫišuwa festival mention the clothing of statues representing Allani and Išḫara, with the former receiving a blue garment and the latter an identical red one. Veneration of them as a pair was an example of a broader phenomenon frequently attested in Hurrian sources, the worship of pairs of deities with similar purposes as if they constituted an unirty, with other examples including Šauška's attendants Ninatta and Kulitta, the fate goddesses Hutena and Hutellura, Ḫepat and her son Šarruma, and the astral deities Pinikir and DINGIR.GE_{6}, so-called Goddess of the Night. In some cases Allani and Išḫara could receive a single offering jointly.

Another Hurrian goddess connected to the underworld who sometimes appears in the proximity of Allani was Shuwala, though she was more commonly associated with Nabarbi. Edward Lipiński argues that Shuwala was the same deity as Allani, but they appear together as two distinct deities in texts from Ur and Hattusa.

Presumably due to her own role as a deity associated with fate, Allani was associated with Hutena and Hutellura.

=== Allani and Ereshkigal ===
Allani's character was in part influenced by the Mesopotamian goddess Ereshkigal, who similarly was associated with the underworld. The sumerogram ^{d}EREŠ.KI.GAL could be used to represent Allani's name in Hittite sources. However, it is not clear if the two goddesses were already considered analogous in the Ur III period. Jeremiah Peterson notes that they occur apart from each other in a non-standard Old Babylonian god list from Nippur. According to Doris Prechel, the oldest evidence for a connection between them is the Old Babylonian forerunner to the god list An = Anum, in which they appear in sequence. Another text belonging to this genre from the same period identifies Allatum both with Ereshkigal and with the term Irkalla, in this context prefaced by the so-called "divine determinative" and thus treated as a theonym rather than as a place name. This word is best attested as a name of the underworld in literary texts, and might represent an Akkadian rendering of Sumerian urugal (variant: erigal), "great city", similarly designating the land of the dead. A direct equation between Allatum and Ereshkigal is also attested in the An = Anum (tablet V, line 213). According to Nathan Wasserman, the name Allatum also designates Ereshkigal in an incantation dedicated to the medicine goddess Gula. It credits the latter with helping a child patient whose skull sutures were loosened by Allatum and had to be sealed again. The short narrative included in this text also mentions Sin, but it is not clear how the three deities involved were connected with each other. In the so-called Underworld Vision of an Assyrian Prince, the invocation of Allatum by the protagonist, prince Kummâ, is presumed to be a case of the name being used as a synonym of Ereshkigal as well. In a later section of the narrative Ereshkigal appears under her primary name.

=== Allani and Anatolian underworld deities ===
In Kizzuwatna Allani came to be identified with a local underworld deity, the so-called "Sun goddess of the Earth". The connection between them is first documented in the middle of the second millennium BCE. Gernot Wilhelm suggests the Anatolian goddess might have been a chthonic aspect of the Hattian sun goddess in origin. Piotr Taracha instead classifies her as a Luwian deity and notes that despite her connection to the underworld her character might have been comparable to that of the Ugaritic goddess Shapash prior to being reshaped by the development of an association with Allani under Hurrian cultural influence. Despite the development of this connection, Allani herself did not acquire the characteristics of a solar deity. In Kizzuwatna, where the two goddesses were regarded as identical, they presided over ritual purification and were believed to keep evil and impurity sealed in her kingdom. It has been suggested that the Gulšeš, who belonged to the entourage of the Sun goddess of the Earth, were modeled on Hutena and Hutellura, who were associated with Allani.

Under her Mesopotamian name Allatum Allani came to be linked with Lelwani, originally a male god from the Hattian pantheon, who started to be viewed as a goddess due to this equation, as already attested in sources dated to the reign of Hittite king Ḫattušili III. Piotr Taracha argues that Lelwani's name was effectively reassigned to Allatum, who he assumes was venerated as a separate figure from Allani in Anatolia. Alfonso Archi notes that ^{d}ALLATUM, Lelwani, and ^{d}EREŠ.KI.GAL, Allani, may occur in the same texts separately from each other, which indicates that the two were not directly regarded as the same after Lelwani was reinterpreted as a female deity.

=== Allani and Arsay ===
It is possible that in Ugarit Arsay, one of the daughters of the local weather god Baal, was viewed as the equivalent of Allani (Allatum), and like her she might have been a deity linked to the underworld. Volkert Haas suggested that this connection is reflected by the placement of Arsay and Išḫara in sequence in one of the Ugaritic offering lists. However, Steve A. Wiggins stresses that it is important to maintain caution when attempting to define the roles of poorly attested Ugaritic deities, such as Baal's daughters, entirely based on the character of their presumed equivalents.

== Worship ==
According to Gernot Wilhelm, based on available sources it can be assumed Allani was worshiped chiefly in the western Hurrian areas. Alfonso Archi describes her as one of the primary Hurrian goddesses next to Išḫara and Šauška. She appears in offering lists (kaluti) focused on Ḫepat, in which she is typically placed after Išḫara and before the pair Umbu-Nikkal. A similar enumeration of deities with Allani also placed after Išḫara is attested in the ritual of Ammiḫatna from Kizzuwatna.

It is uncertain which city was considered Allani's main cult center, as documents from the Ur III period seemingly connect her with Zimudar located in the Diyala area, but in Hittite sources she is instead associated with Ḫaššum, possibly to be identified with Ḫašuanu from the Ebla texts. She is also attested in the text corpus from Tigunani from the reign of Tunip-Teshub (Old Babylonian period, c. 1630 BCE). She occurs in an omen apodosis. Theophoric names invoking her were common chiefly in the Tur Abdin area located in the southeast of modern Turkey. A single example is also known from the text corpus from Tuttul, Arip-Allani, "Allani gave (a child)".

Allani was also among the Hurrian deities worshiped in Ugarit. Hurrian offering lists from this city reflect the customs from the thirteenth century BCE and show occasional incorporation of Ugaritic deities like El and Anat into Hurrian ceremonies. In the text RS 24.261, which contains instructions for a ritual focused on Ashtart and Šauška, written in both Ugaritic and Hurrian, she is mentioned in a list of deities who received offerings during it, after Išḫara and before Nikkal. In RS 24.291, a ritual taking place over the course of three days focused on Pidray, she is listed as the recipient of a sacrificial cow on the second day and two rams on the third. Offering lists in which she appears between Išḫara and Hutena-Hutellura are known too.

=== Mesopotamian reception ===
Under the Akkadian form of her name, Allani was also worshiped in Mesopotamia. She was one of the foreign deities worshiped in Ur in the Ur III period. (Note: Other examples include Belet Dalatim, Belet-Šuḫnir, Belet-Terraban, Ḫabūrītum, Šauška, Dagan, Išḫara and Shuwala.) She might have been introduced there from the areas in the proximity of the upper section of the river Khabur. Offerings made to her are well documented in the archive of queen Shulgi-simti alongside these to goddesses such as Išḫara, Belet Nagar, Belet-Šuḫnir and Belet-Terraban. Administrative documents from Puzrish-Dagan (Drehem) detailing the amount of sacrifices made to various deities mention Allatum alongside both foreign and Mesopotamian deities. The sacrifice of a piglet to her is documented in the text YBC 16473, but unlike other livestock these animals were not distributed by the royal administration from Puzrish-Dagan. At least one temple dedicated to Allatum, most likely located in Ur, is attested. Two texts mention the staff of temples of Allatum, Annunitum and Shuwala. There is also evidence that she received offerings during rites held in honor of deceased kings in this city.

In Nippur, Allatum was venerated alongside a different group of deities than in Ur: Enlil and Ninlil, Alla-gula and Ningagia. (Note: Nigagia, "mistress of the cloister", was a local goddess from this city.) During the seventh day of the festival of Inanna which took place annually during the sixth month in the local calendar she also received offerings alongside Idlurugu, a god who represented river ordeal. She continued to be worshiped in this city in the Old Babylonian period.

A single reference to a temple of Allatum has been identified in the corpus of texts from Old Babylonian Sippar. It occurs in a lawsuit dated to the reign of Sabium, and the goddess is otherwise not attested in any sources from this city, which indicates her cult had a small scope and might have not been maintained in later periods.

The Old Babylonian Bird Omen Compendium, a divination manual explaining how to interpret the signs on the carcass of a sacrificial bird, identifies one possible location of an ominous red spot as a portent of Allatum. It has been noted that the section in which she appears seems to focus on deities chiefly worshiped in western areas, such as Adad and Išḫara, and their respective circles.

=== Hittite reception ===
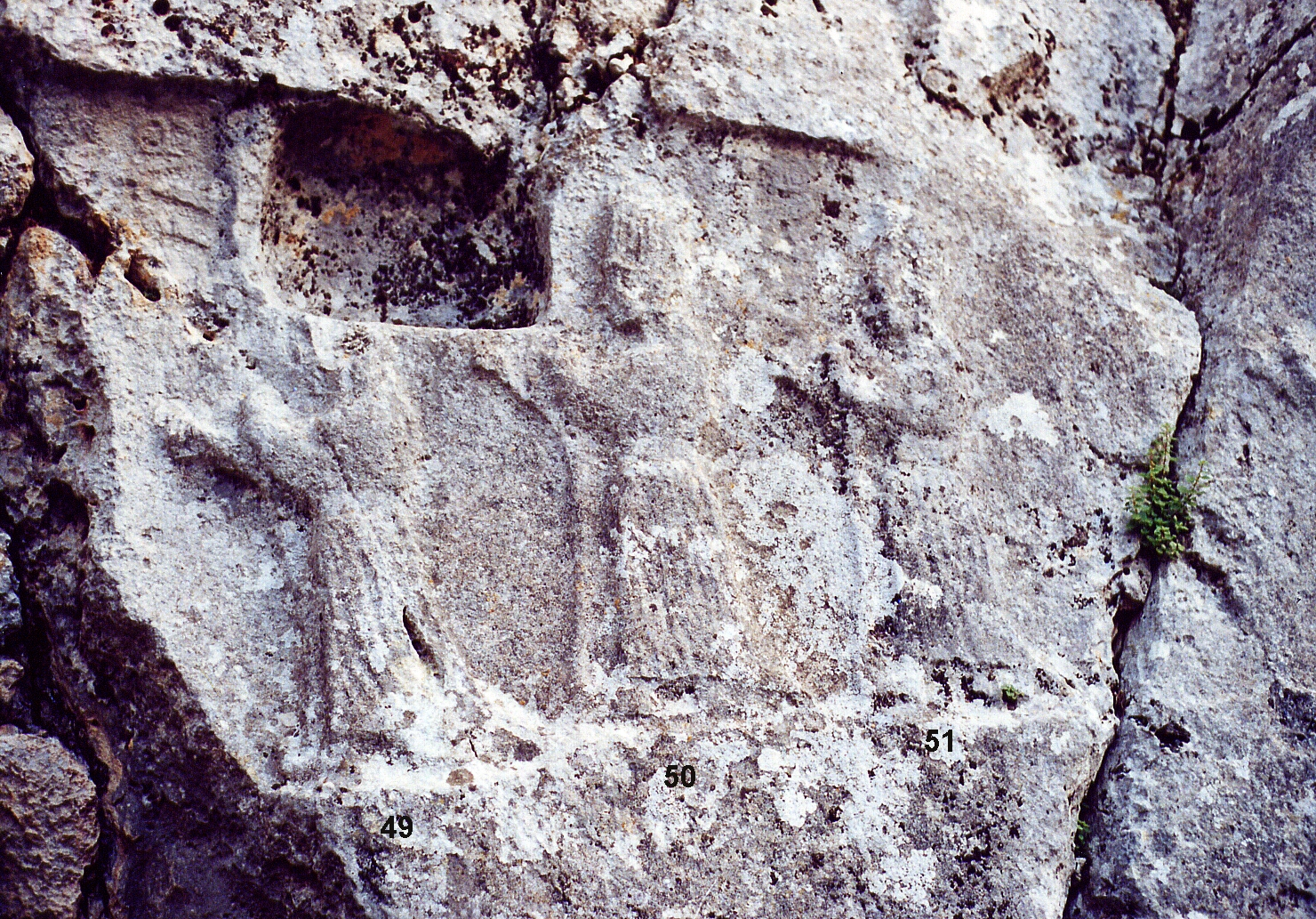
Allani, Išḫara and Nabarbi on the Yazılıkaya reliefs.

The Hittite king Ḫattušili I listed Allani (under the name Allatum) as one of the deities whose statues he brought to Hatti as war booty, alongside the storm god of Aleppo, Lelluri, and the mountain gods Adalur and Amaruk. She came to be worshiped by the Hittites as one of the deities belonging to the state pantheon in the Middle Hittite period.

During the ḫišuwa festival, which was introduced from Kizzuwatna by queen Puduḫepa and was meant to guarantee good fortune for the royal couple Allani appears alongside "Teshub Manuzi," Lelluri, Išḫara, two hypostases of Nupatik (pibitḫi - "of Pibid(a)" and zalmatḫi - "of Zalman(a)/Zalmat") and Maliya. Texts describing it mention a temple dedicated to her, in which she was venerated alongside Hutena-Hutellura, Kurra, (Note: A possible late form of the Eblaite god Kura, who is otherwise not attested after the fall of Ebla.) Zimazalla and a further deity whose name is not preserved. It is designated as a location where the king was supposed to make an offering (keldi) to her.

In Yazılıkaya, a sanctuary located close to Hattusa and tied to the Hurrian-influenced religious practice of the royal family, Allani (Allatum) is depicted in a procession of goddesses reflecting the order of the kaluti of Ḫepat, with the two following figures being Išḫara and Nabarbi.

Texts from Emar which reflect Hittite traditions also mention Allani.

== Mythology ==
Allani is one of the three deities playing main roles in the Song of Release, the other two being Teshub and Išḫara. The former at one point descends to the underworld and partakes in a banquet held by Allani alongside his enemies, the "former gods" whose defeat is described in the cycle of Kumarbi, but much of the rest of the narrative is missing and both its conclusion and purpose are uncertain. Volkert Haas suggests that the underworld banquet should be understood as an episode comparable to the Mesopotamian myth of Inanna's descent to the netherworld, with Teshub temporarily imprisoned in the land of the dead. This interpretation has been critically evaluated by Ewa von Dassow, who points out that Haas did not depend on the text itself, as no reference to the weather god being imprisoned in it, and in his publications instead offered indirect evidence from unrelated compositions such as the aforementioned Mesopotamian myth or Ovid's Metamorphoses. She instead suggests that the meeting is focused on discussing the destruction of Ebla, around which much of the plot of the composition revolves, as it would inevitably lead to an influx of new inhabitants into Allani's realm. Gernot Wilhelm proposes that Teshub's descent to the underworld was meant to ease his anger with the treatment of his human followers by the elders of Ebla, described in other fragments of the same text, though he also considers it possible that the myth reflected rituals in which a deceased person was supposed to enter the underworld and meet their ancestors in the underworld. Mary R. Bachvarova assumes that the meeting with Allani is related to the fact that the humans Teshub is concerned with in other sections of the myth are meant to care for funerary rites. Walter Burkert and Erich Neu suggested that Allani presided over reconciliation between Teshub and his enemies.
