= Manuzi =

Mountain god from Kizzuwatna

Manuzi (also spelled Manuzzi) was a mountain god worshiped in Kizzuwatna. He shared his name with the mountain he represented and with a village. He is best attested from sources pertaining to the hišuwa festival, which indicate he was the husband of the goddess Lelluri. He could be identified as a form of the Hurrian weather god Teshub as well, and as such was referred to as Teshub Manuzi.

== Character ==
Manuzi was a mountain god, but he could also be identified as a form of Teshub, and as such could be referred to as "Teshub Manuzi." He was associated with a mountain and a settlement which both shared his name. According to Volkert Haas, the latter was not historically notable. It was located in the proximity of the Gulf of Alexandretta.

Documentation pertaining to the hišuwa festival mentions an eagle who sat on the shoulder of Manuzi, Eribuški, whose name has Hurrian origin. A separate ritual involved washing a golden statue of him. Eagles were also a symbol of other mountain gods in ancient Syria and Anatolia, for example a Hittite text describing the appearance of various deities mentions that the cult statue of the mountain god Kuwarri was accompanied by an iron eagle, while an eagle made out of ivory was an attribute of Iškiša. Volkert Haas notes the association of deified mountains with eagles is already attested in the case of the Eblaite Adarwan in the third millennium BCE. An Eblaite incantation (ARET 5.16) refers to ^{d}A-dar-wa-an BE ti_{8}^{MUŠEN}.ti_{8}^{MUŠEN}, "Adarwan, lord of the eagles."

Manuzi was not the only mountain god from southern Anatolia and northern Syria who could be labeled as a weather deity – Hittite documents refer to a weather god labeled as "Lord of Amaruk," apparently a derivative of the mountain god Ammarik known from texts from Ebla. The corresponding landmark was located somewhere in the land of Mukish.

Manuzi's spouse was the Hurrian goddess Lelluri.

== Worship ==
Manuzi was worshiped in Kummanni in Kizzuwatna. A temple dedicated to him existed in that city. He was worshiped during nine day hišuwa festival, known from a set of tablets with instructions pertaining to it prepared for queen Puduḫepa. Other deities mentioned alongside him include Lelluri, Allani, Išḫara, two manifestations of Nupatik and the Luwian goddess Maliya.

Hittite documents attest the existence of a ritual dedicated to Manuzi which took place in the main temple of the storm god of Hatti.
