= Tell Agrab =

Archaeological site in Iraq

- Location within Iraq
- 33°20′20″N 44°52′28″E
- Type: settlement
- Periods: Bronze Age
- Cultures: Jemdet Nasr, Early Dynastic, Akkadian, Larsa
- Location: Diyala Governorate, Iraq

History
- Built: 3rd millennium BC

Site notes
- Excavation dates: 1936-1937
- Archaeologists: Seton Lloyd
- Condition: Ruined
- Owner: Public
- Public access: Yes

Tell Agrab (or Aqrab) is a tell or settlement mound 12.6 miles (20.3 km) southeast of Eshnunna in the Diyala region of Iraq. It is about 15 miles southeast of Tell Asmar, ancient Eshnunna. It has been suggested that the ancient name of the site was PA.GAR.

== History ==
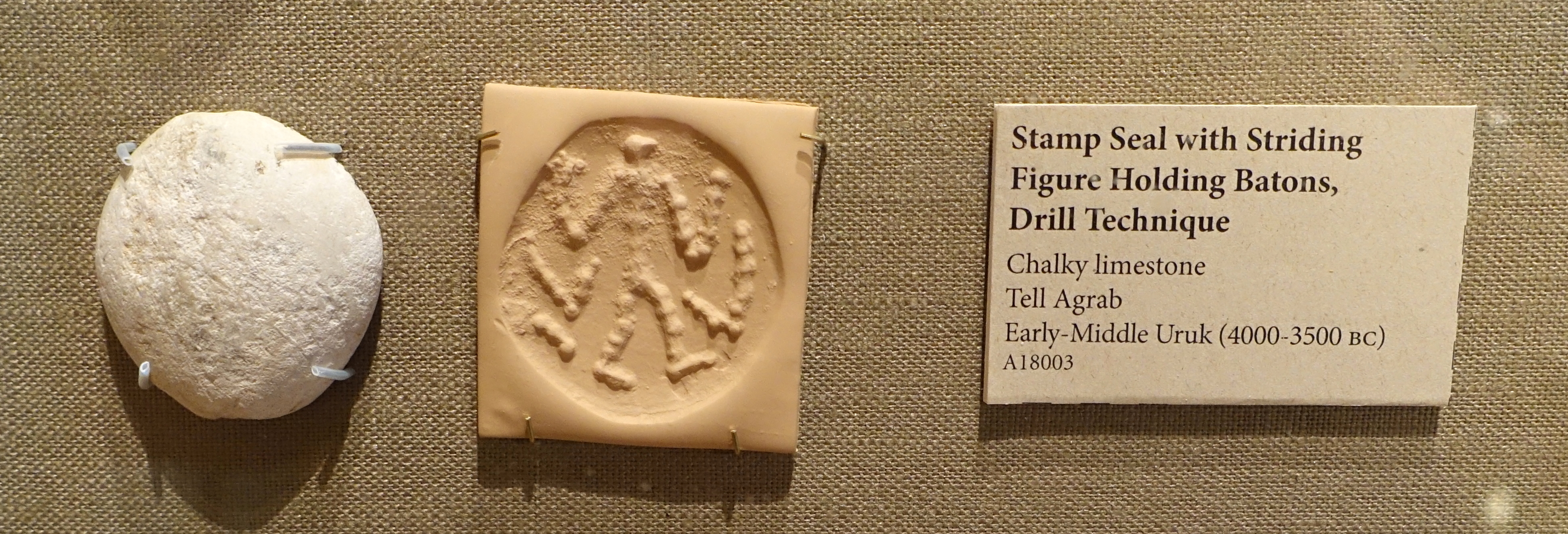
Stamp seal with Striding Figure Holding Batons, Drill Technique, Tell Agrab. Oriental Institute Museum, University of Chicago

Tell Agrab was occupied during the Jemdet Nasr and Early Dynastic periods through the Akkadian and Larsa periods. It was during the Early Dynastic period that monumental building occurred, including the Shara Temple. There is no evidence that it was occupied after the end of the third millennium BC.

== Archaeology ==
Tell Agrab is located south east of ancient Eshnunna

The site of Tell Agrab is encompassed by a 500 by 600 metres (1,600 by 2,000 ft) rectangle with a height of around 12 metres (39 ft). It was surrounded by a fortification wall made of plano-convex bricks and with defensive towers every 19 meters. Though it had been subject to illegal digging earlier with materials from there appearing with Baghdad antiquities dealers, the site was officially excavated between 1935 and 1937 by a team from the Oriental Institute of Chicago which was also working at Eshnunna, Khafajah and Tell Ishchali during that time. The dig was led by Seton Lloyd.

The primary excavation effort was on the large Early Dynastic temple consisting of a main sanctuary with altar and offering table and two smaller subsidiary sanctuaries on the same plan The temple was believed by the excavators to be dedicated to Shara based on a stone bowl fragment inscription "To Shara has Anunu, foreman of (yeo)men, presented (this) as a gift.". However, subsequent research suggests that it may have belonged to a local deity, Iluma'tim, while the name ^{d}LAGABxIGI-gunû from the bowl fragment, formerly read as Shara, might instead be Išḫara, which according to Gianni Marchesi and Nicolo Marchetti is more plausible in the light of the distribution of cult centers of these two deities. Only the western end of the temple was studied, the rest being badly eroded. The temple was about 60 metres (200 ft) square and was surrounded by a wall 6 metres (20 ft) wide with large supporting buttresses. The presence of sling stones and a sappers tunnel indicated an attack in the Early Dynastic era. Aside from a number of treasure caches, cylinder seals, and a sculptured mace-head of gypsum ornamented with lions' head found, the most notable find was a copper chariot pulled by four onagers, one of the earliest examples known. Three cuneiform tablets in Old Akkadian were also found as well as "two small bronze statuettes of men and one of a woman (all with inlaid eyes of mother of pearl)" as well as tools and weapons made of bronze and the remains of a copper statue that would have originally been 4/5 life size. A metal hoard consisting of "silver wires, rings/coils, ornaments, beads and an enigmatic ‘gold weight'" was found in a long corridor and dated to Early Dynastic II. A single neolithic clay token was also found. A notable find was a green steatite vase, elaborately engraved.

== Gallery ==
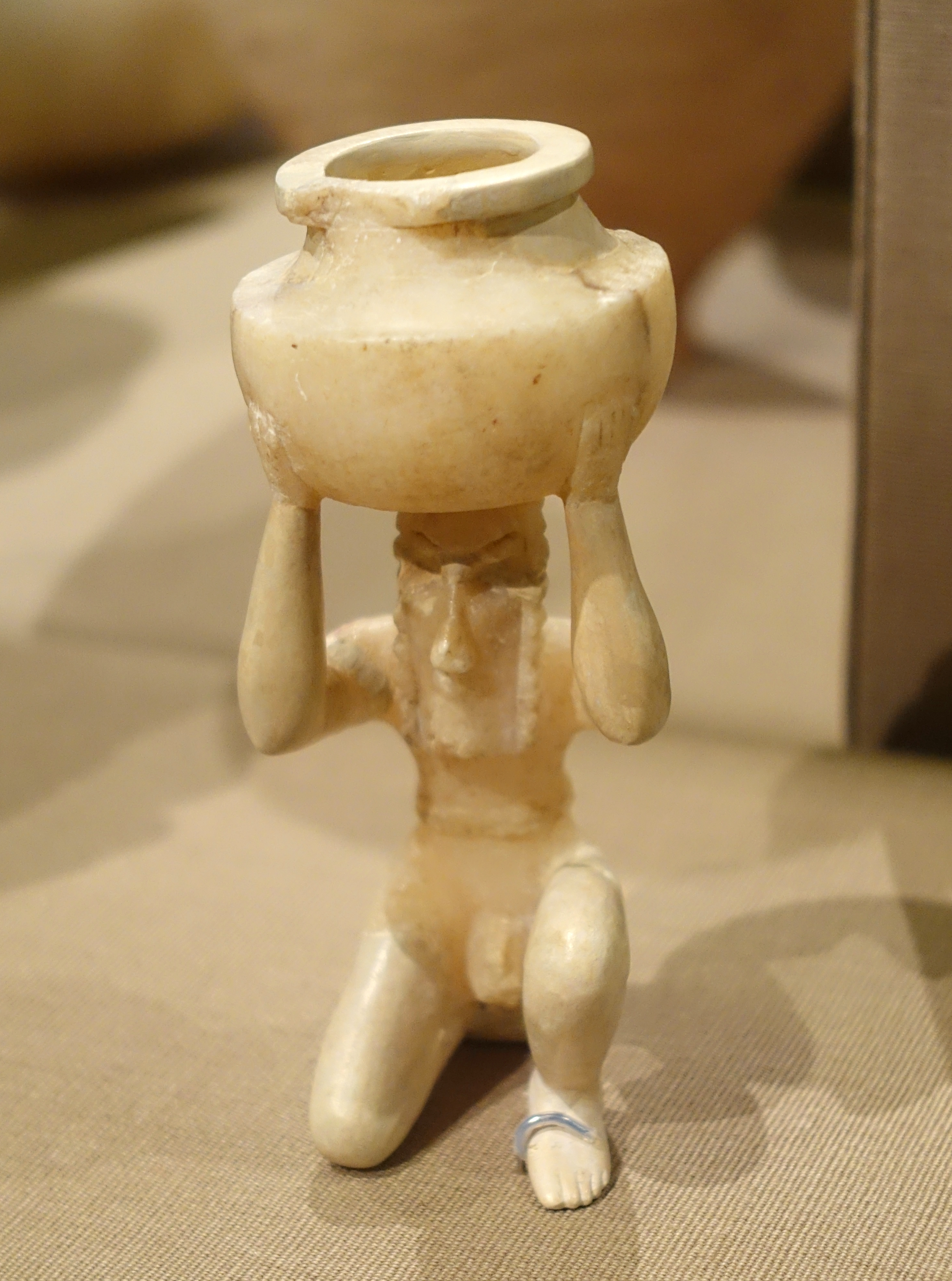
Kneeling Nude Male Holding Vase on Head, Tell Agrab, Shara Temple, Early Dynastic period, 2900-2700 BC, calcite - Oriental Institute Museum, University of Chicago - DSC07462

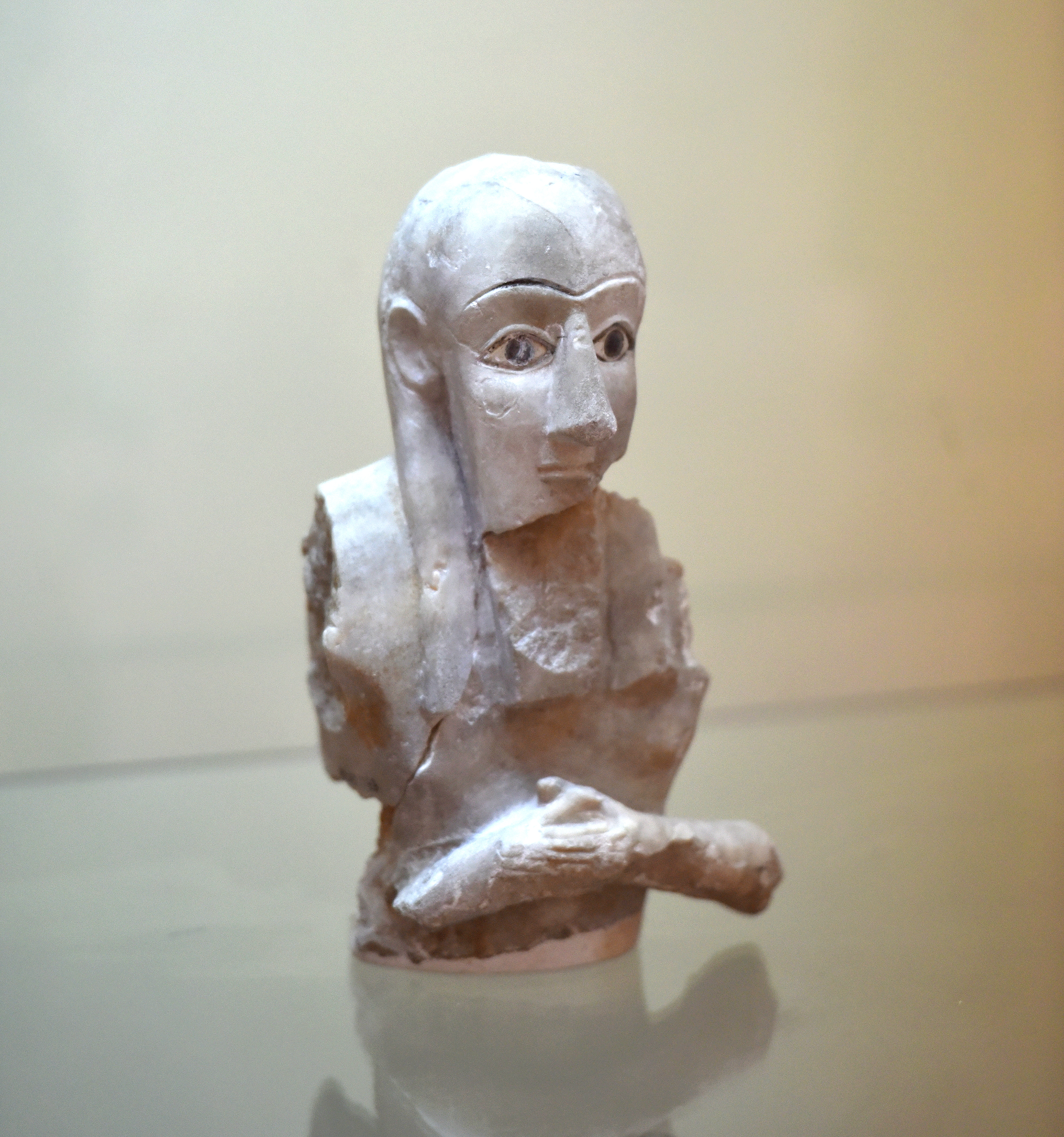
Fragment of a Sumerian male statue from the Shara Temple at Tell Agrab, Iraq Museum

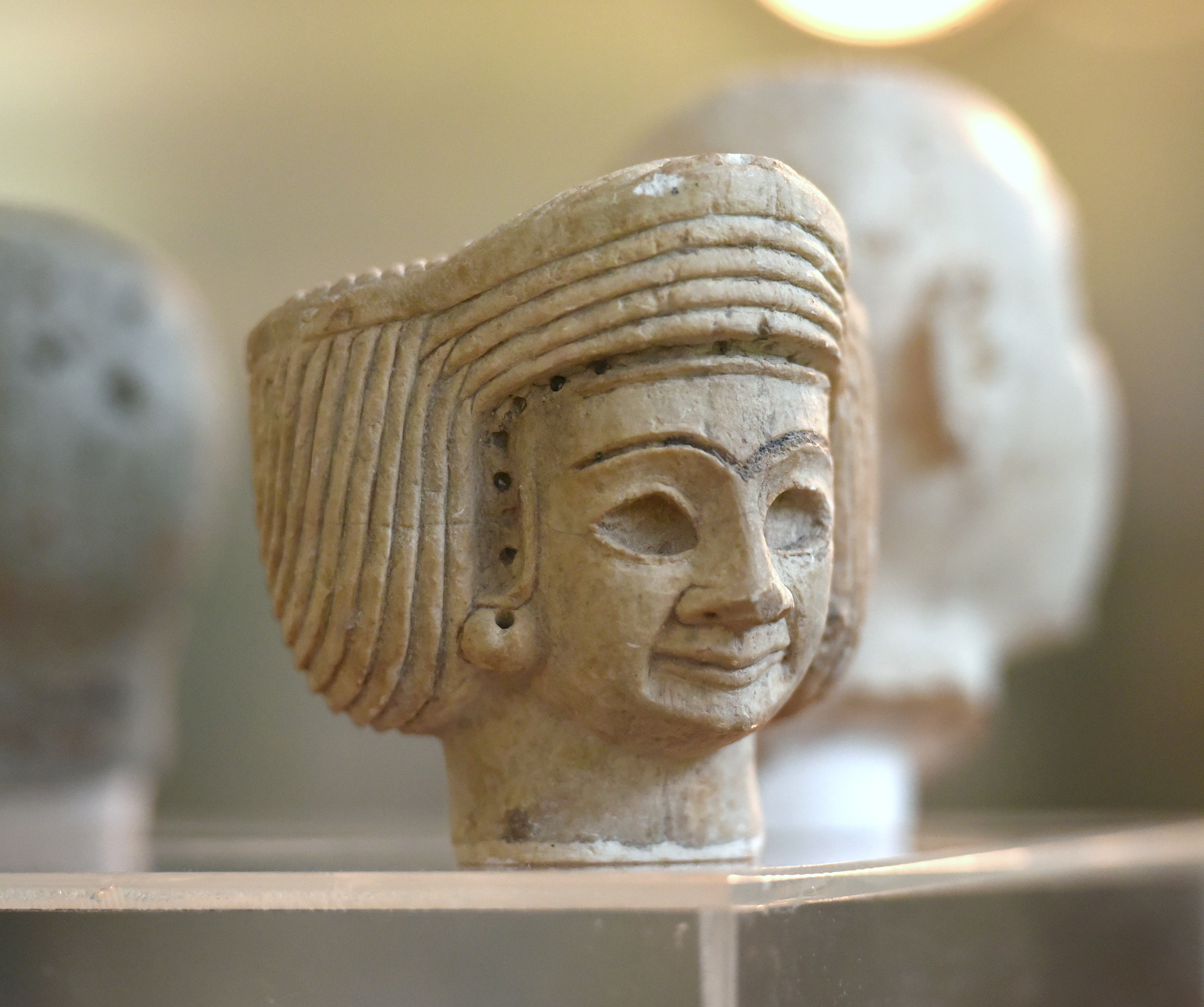
Head of a Sumerian woman from the Shara Temple at Tell Agrab, Iraq Museum

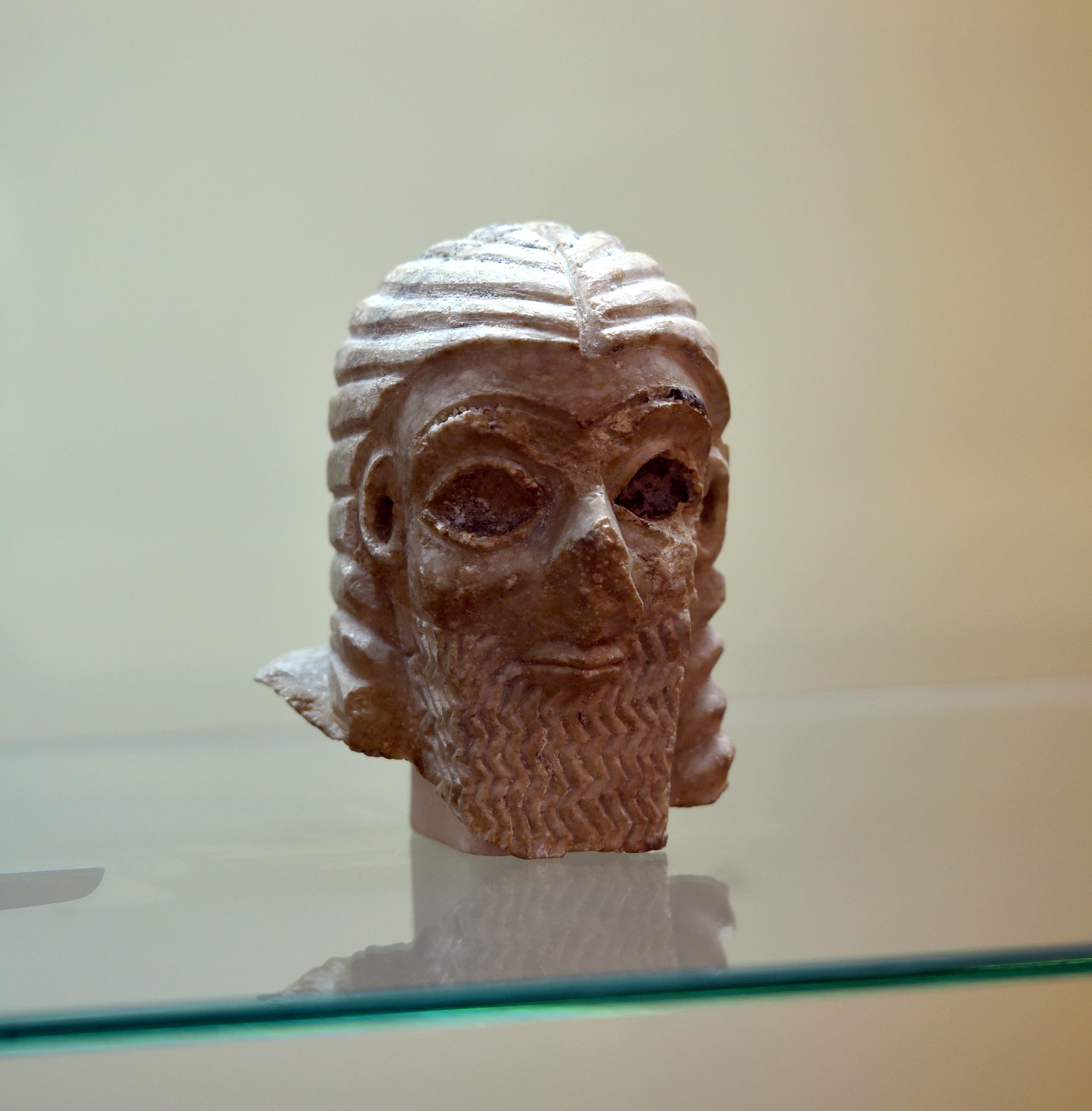
Male head from Shara Temple, Tell Agrab, Iraq Museum

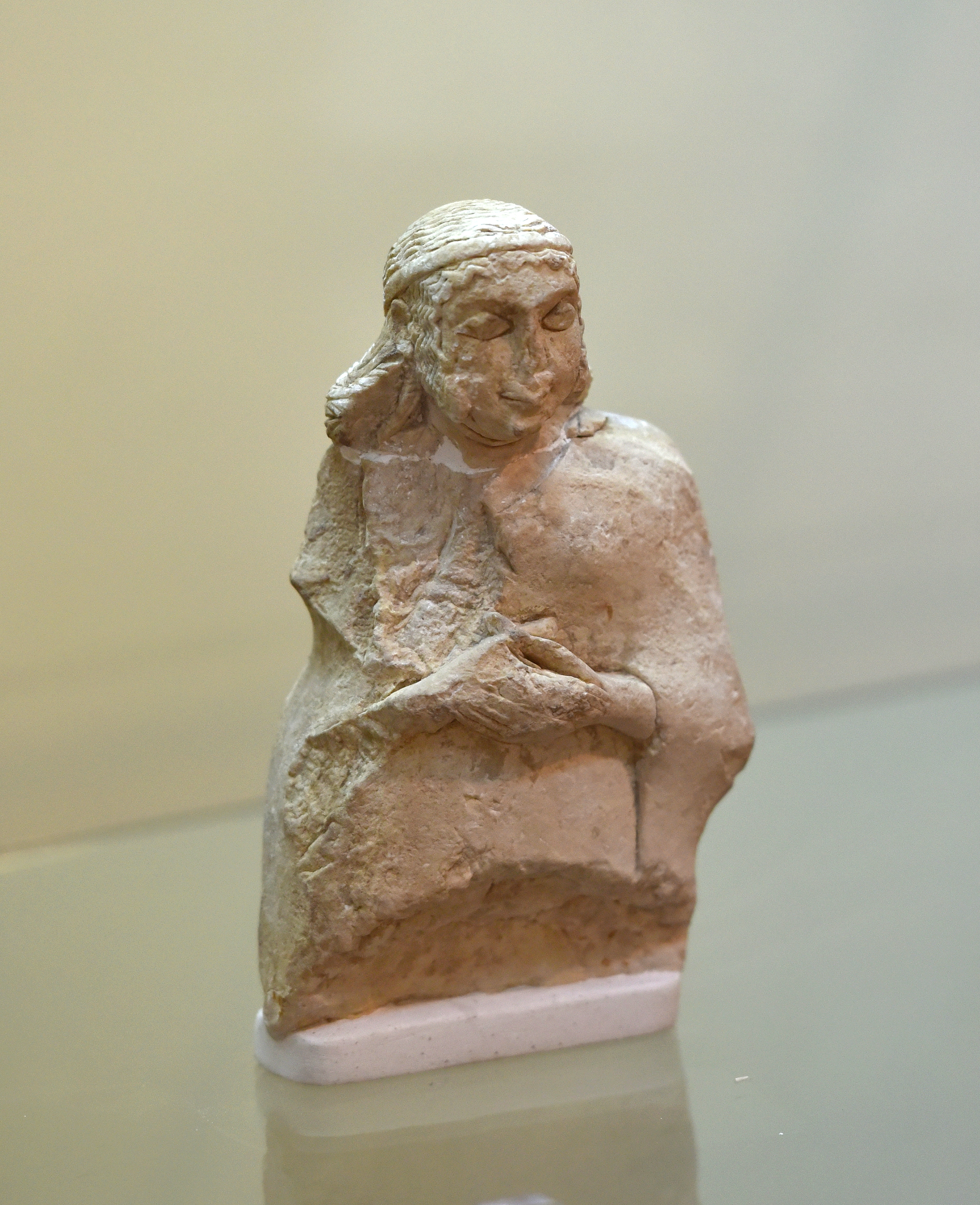
Female statuette from Tell Agrab, Iraq Museum

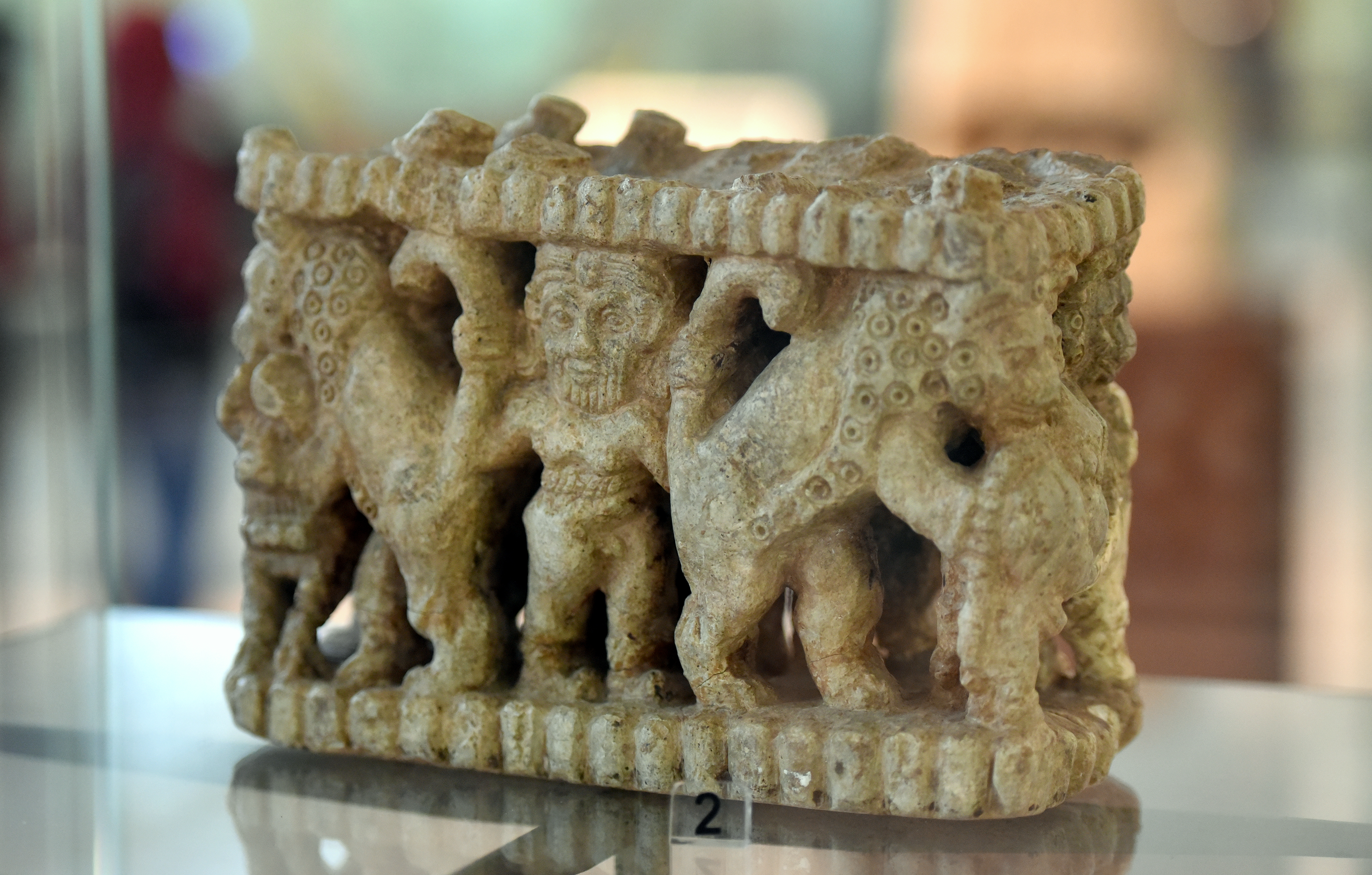
Gilgamesh wrestling two bulls, from Shara Temple, Tell Agrab, Iraq Museum

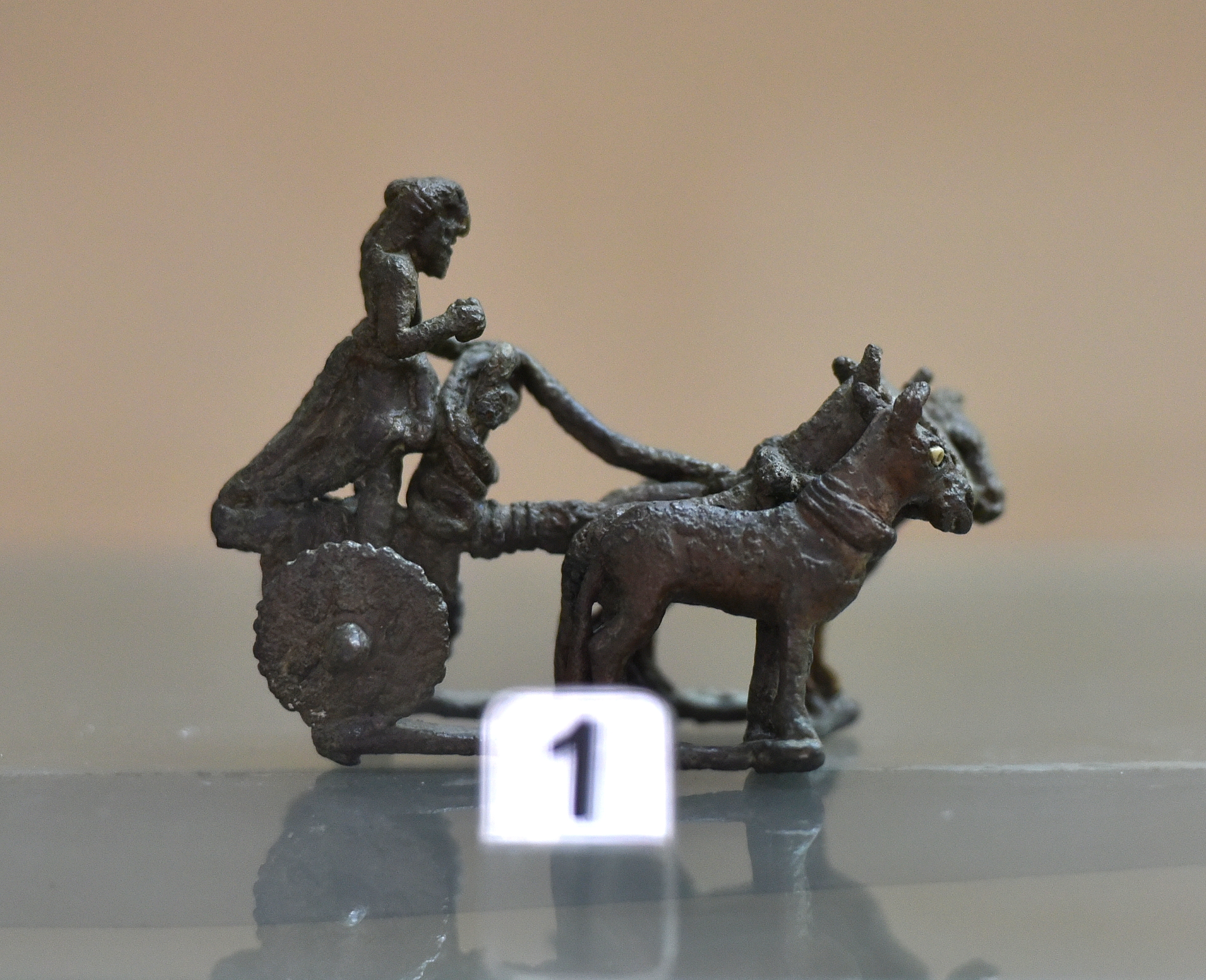
Quadriga consists of a chariot and a charioteer with four onagers. From Tell Agrab, Iraq. Early Dynastic period, 2600-2370 BCE. Iraq Museum

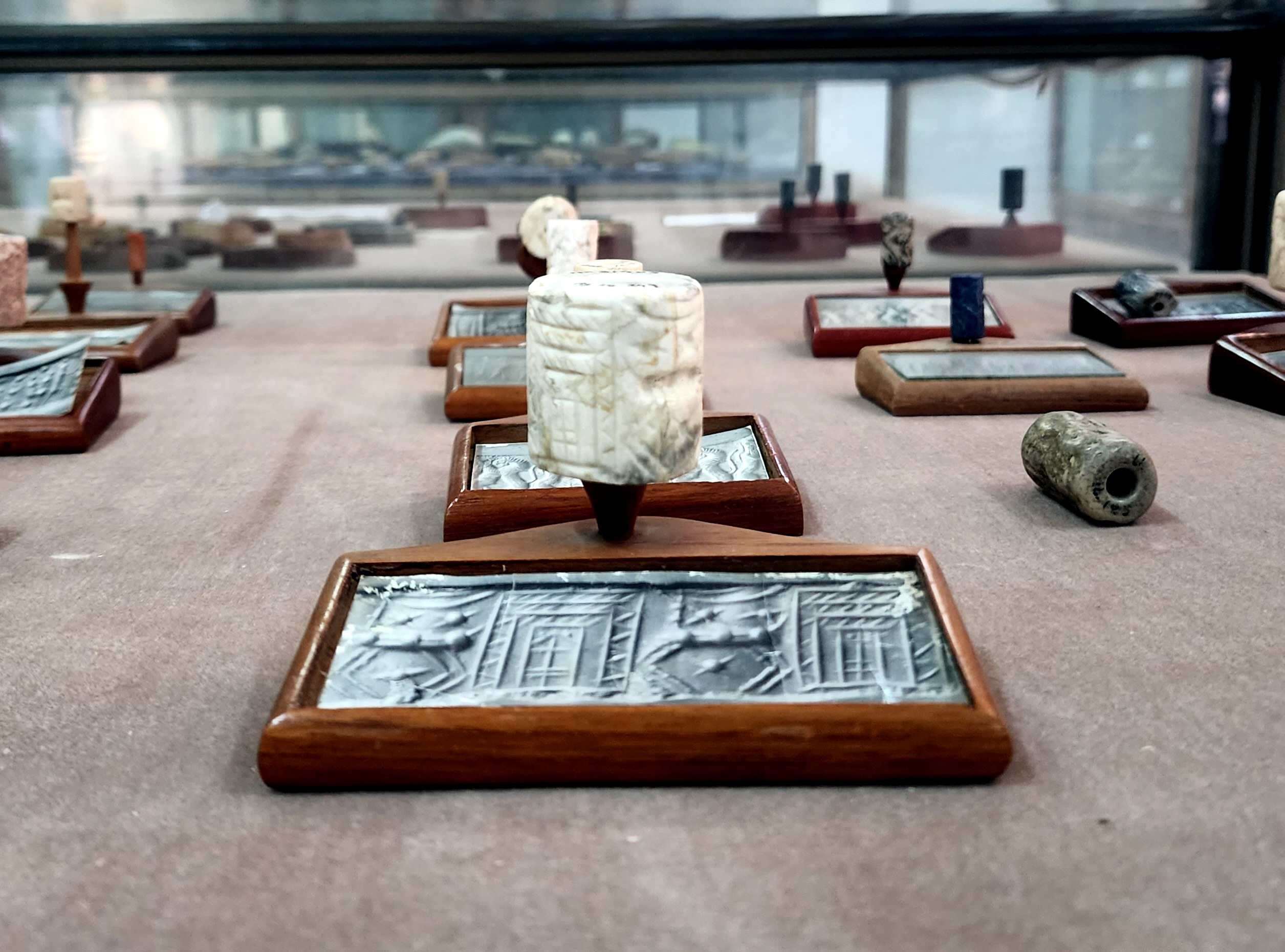
Cylinder seal, white marble. Two goats, two shrines, and stars. Jemdet Nasr period, 3100-2900 BCE. From Tell Agrab, Iraq. Sulaymaniyah Museum, Iraq

== See also ==
- Cities of the ancient Near East
