= Harbidum =

City in Sumer

Harbidum is the name of a minor city of Sumer, located near Kish, at the Irnina canal (connecting it with Kutha). The city contained a temple dedicated to Išḫara. Harbidum is one of a cluster of settlements of which Kish was the most prominent, and which also included Garnanum and Lulhani.
