= Indilimma =

King of Ebla (fl. c. 1600 BC)

King of Ebla
- Reign: c. 1600 BC
- Issue: Maratewari
- Father: Sir-Damu

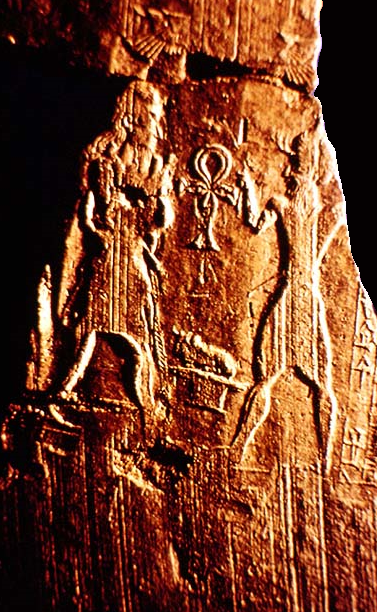
Indilimma's son Maratewari (left) receiving an ankh from a Yamhadite god

Indilimma, previously read Indilimgur (fl. c. 1600 BC), was likely the last king of Ebla.

== Reign ==
Indilimma was the son of Sir-Damu according to a seal of his discovered in Cilicia. He is also known from several jars bearing the impression of a cylinder seal of his son, the crown prince Maratewari. The seal impressions are of high quality and show inspirations from the art of the kingdom of Yamhad. On the seals, Indilimma's son is depicted while receiving life (in the form of an ancient Egyptian ankh symbol) by the Yamhadite deities Hadad and Hebat.
The fact that these jars were found within the archaeological context of the final destruction of Ebla, which occurred around 1600 BC by the hands of the Hittite king Mursili I, suggested to Paolo Matthiae that Maratewari had no time to become king and that his father Indilimma was indeed the last ruler of palaeosyrian Ebla. Alfonso Archi argued that Maratewari (whose name reading is not certain and Archi gives it as Memal...arri) was the last king and noted that Maratewari was not mentioned as king on his seal but neither was Indilimma on his seal from Cilicia. For Archi, the lack of the royal title does not mean that both father and son were not kings, but it is just a sign of subordination to Yamhad, the hegemonic kingdom of Northern Syria during the 17th century BC. Indilimma's name also appears on a legal document found in the western palace at Ebla.
