= Saggar (god) =

Syrian god

- God of the Sinjar Mountains and the moon
- Other names: Sanugaru, Šaggar, Šanugaru
- Major cult center: Mane, Kurda, Emar
- Symbols: possibly the lunar crescent
- Consort: usually none, rarely Išḫara (in Mesopotamia)

Saggar (also Šaggar, Sanugaru, Šanugaru) was a god worshiped in ancient Syria, especially in the proximity of Ebla and Emar, later incorporated into the Hurrian and Hittite pantheons. His name was also the ancient name of the Sinjar Mountains. It is assumed that he was at least in part a lunar deity.

== Character ==
Information about the character and development of Saggar is incomplete and difficult to interpret. The name itself is not spelled consistently, especially in sources from the second millennium BCE, and in particular the first consonant often varies between s and š. The meaning of the name is unknown, and it has been proposed that it comes from a linguistic substrate unrelated to other languages of the Ancient Near East. Two primary aspects of Saggar seemed to be those of a deified mountain range and of a lunar god.

=== Deified mountain range ===
The name Saggar was applied to a mountain range presumably associated with the god, located in the north of modern Iraq, known today as the Sinjar Mountains. It has also been proposed that the city of Saggarâtum known from texts from Mari and Tell al-Rimah was connected with Saggar.

An explanatory text indicates that Saggar was associated with millstones in Mesopotamia, possibly because the corresponding mountain range was a source of basalt, used to make these implements. Pistachios (Akkadian: butmatim) were another commodity associated with him and the mountains, according to texts from Mari. Possibly this association extended to almonds and terebinth as well, though this remains unclear.

=== Lunar god ===
It is commonly regarded as possible that unlike other moon gods worshiped in the ancient Near East, Saggar only represented a specific phase of the Moon, though this association seems to vary across time and space - while in Emar he is exclusively associated with the full moon, documents from Ebla might point at an association with the crescent.

In a text from Ebla, two horns of ^{d}Sa-nu-ga-ru in one text occur in parallel with two horns of ITU, possibly understood as new moon, from another, similar one. The same texts pair both the moon and Sanugaru (Saggar) with the sun. However, Alfonso Archi rejects the possibility that at Ebla the logogram ^{d}EN.ZU, used to designate the moon god, could refer to Saggar even in situations mentioning a plurality of ^{d}EN.ZU, and instead assumes that such phrases might refer to two horns of the lunar crescent. He does accept that Saggar should be understood as a lunar god, and that there is no guarantee that in other settlements in Syria in the third millennium BCE the god represented by ^{d}EN.ZU would be Suen. He proposes that Sanugaru could have represented some aspect of the moon not embodied by Suen, a specific phase of it, or that he belonged to a religious and linguistic substrate absorbed by the Eblaites, who already venerated Suen. In addition to Saggar, lunar character has also been proposed for another Eblaite god assumed to belong to such a substrate, Hadabal, based on the fact that Larugadu, originally one of the centers of his cult, was later associated with Yarikh.

More direct evidence is available from Emar, where the same theophoric name is written syllabically in Luwian hieroglyphs as containing the theophoric element Saggar (sà-ga-ra) while in cuneiform ^{d}XXX, a logogram denoting lunar deities, appears instead. Even there Saggar appears as a figure distinct from the regular moon god, however, and both of them play distinct roles in the local zukru festival. It is unclear what god was represented by ^{d}XXX in Emar - Sin, Yarikh, or yet another lunar deity, and it is possible that multiple lunar gods of varying origin were worshiped in this city. Additionally, a different logogram, ^{d}ḪAR, could be employed to write the name Saggar.

Piotr Taracha notes that Saggar's well attested association with Išḫara might be considered evidence in favor of his role being understood as that of a moon god, as this goddess appears frequently alongside moon gods in sources from ancient Syria and Anatolia.

== Associations with other deities ==
As early as in the third millennium BCE, Saggar was associated with Išḫara, as attested by the texts from Ebla, which mention that they were worshiped together in Mane. A connection between them is also present in Hittite, Hurrian and Ugaritic sources. The Mesopotamian god list An = Anum makes Saggar the husband of Išḫara, but Lluis Felieu notes that while she was associated with various male deities in different time periods and locations, most evidence does not indicate that she was believed to have a permanent spouse.

Deities associated with both Išḫara and Saggar include Halma and Tuḫḫitra. Tuḫḫitra is otherwise unknown, and information about Halma is too scarce to determine this deity's gender or character with certainty. Daniel E. Fleming tentatively links Halma with the city of Halab (modern Aleppo), but notes there is no direct evidence for this connection, and that his proposal relies on vague similarity of the deity's name with some alternate spellings of that belonging to the city. Gabriele Theuer assumes that Halma was a female deity and the partner (parhedra) of Saggar.

In Emar, a deity named Mušītu (^{d}Mu-šī-tu_{4}, ^{d}Mu-šī-ti), "night," was worshiped in association with Saggar.

In Ugarit, Saggar was associated with the deity ‘Iṯum, tentatively identified with the Mesopotamian Ishum. In standard cuneiforms texts the names were written logographically as ^{d}ḪAR ù ^{d}GÌR, while in texts written in the local alphabetic script - as šgr w ‘iṯm, both meant to be read as Šaggar-wa-‘Iṯum. Unlike names such as Kothar-wa-Khasis, this phrase was understood as a pair of deities, not a single deity with two names. Dennis Pardee suggests that together they might have been responsible for flocks of domestic animals.

Gabriele Theuer proposes that in some contexts Saggar could be identified with the Hurrian moon god Kušuḫ.

== Worship ==
First attestations of Saggar come from Eblaite texts from the third millennium BCE, where the god's name is spelled as Sanugaru, though the related toponym is consistently written as Saggar. According to one of them, he was particularly venerated in Mane (Má-NE^{ki}), located near Emar. It is possible that he can be identified with the "divine lord" of that city, ^{d}BE, known from Eblaite documents, as the identification of that title as a designation of the town's main deity Išḫara is implausible. Despite being attested in ritual texts, Saggar is absent from theophoric names of the inhabitants of Ebla.

Alfonso Archi proposes that after the fall of Ebla, Saggar was among the gods who did not retain their former position in the religion of the Amorites, who became the dominant culture in Syria, and compares his situation to that of Adamma, Ammarik, Aštabi or Halabatu. He assumes that they were reduced to the status of deities of at best local significance, and as a result were easily incorporated into the religion of the Hurrians when they arrived in the same area a few centuries later. In Hurro-Hittite tradition Saggar was celebrated during the spring and autumn festivals of Išḫara.

In texts from the second millennium Saggar was associated with Kurda (modern Balad Sinjar). A treaty from Mari mentions ^{d}Ša-ga-ar be-el Kur-da^{ki}, while a man bearing the theophoric name Sagar-rabu was a commander of the troops from the same city. Saggar was also worshiped in some capacity in Mari and Tell al-Rimah, while at Tell Leilan he appears as one of divine witnesses of a treaty. In a few Old Assyrian documents the theophoric name Puzur-Saggar appears. He is also attested in the Mesopotamian god list An = Anum, and possibly in the Nippur and Weidner god lists as well.

In late Bronze Age Emar, Saggar was worshiped during the zukru festival, seemingly in association with the full moon on the fifteenth day of the month Zarati in the local calendar. While the principal deities of zukru were Dagan and Emar's city god whose name was represented logographically as ^{d}NIN.URTA, Saggar also had a role to play in it, and was apparently believed to be in charge of preparing the city's draft animals for the next season of work. Similar association with cattle is well attested for the Mesopotamian moon god Suen. During the excavations in Emar, one of the discoveries was the archive of a man bearing the theophoric name Saggar-abu, who acted as the city's diviner and based on colophons of the tablets was a copyist of Mesopotamian texts. Offerings to Saggar are also attested in the Ugaritic texts. In one of the offering lists from this city, Šaggar-wa-‘Iṯum receive a single ram after Athirat and before Shapash. According to Dennis Pardee, this is the only reference to the pair in ritual texts.

It is possible that in the first millennium BCE Saggar was worshiped in Carchemish. However, most of the texts from that period appear to only use the name Saggar to designate an administrative division of the Assyrian empire, rather than a deity. Another possible late attestation are theophoric names from Carthage with the element šgr. A certain late reference to Saggar has been identified in an explanatory Babylonian god list.
