= Ammarik =

Eblaite mountain god

Ammarik, also transcribed as Ammarig or Hammarigu, was a god worshiped in Ebla in the third millennium BCE. He was most likely a deified mountain.

After the fall of Ebla, he was incorporated into the pantheon of the Hurrians.

== Character ==
Ammarik was most likely a deified mountain in origin. It is possible that the corresponding landmark is located to the northwest of Ebla, in the proximity of Church of Saint Simeon Stylites. According to Hittite documents, it was located in the land of Mukish. A proposed identity is Mount Simeon, which according to Alfonso Archi is visible from Ebla. In a Hittite document dealing with the borders of the areas under the control of Carchemish, Ammarik is mentioned as a mountain, designated with the determinative ḪUR.SAG.

In later periods, the mountain was apparently seen as the residence of a weather deity, as evidenced by the annals of Ḫattušili I.

== Ammarik and Adarwan ==
In a ritual text from Ammarik occurs next to Adarwan, most likely also a deified mountain. Alfonso Archi considers him to be a god, but Volkert Haas describes Adarwan simply as the "numen" of Ammarik. A village sharing the god's name, A-dar-a-nu^{ki}, is also attested in the Ebla texts. Similarly, a village named after another deified mountain, Saggar, also existed.

An Eblaite incantation (ARET 5.16) refers to ^{d}A-dar-wa-an BE ti_{8}^{MUŠEN}.ti_{8}^{MUŠEN}, "Adarwan, lord of the eagles." Eagles were also a symbol of other mountain gods in ancient Syria and Anatolia, for example a Hittite text describing the appearance of various deities mentions that the cult statue of the mountain god Kuwarri was accompanied by an iron eagle, while an eagle made out of ivory was an attribute of Iškiša. Documentation pertaining to the hišuwa festival mentions an eagle who sat on the shoulder of the mountain god Manuzi, Eribuški.

== Worship ==
in Ebla, two golden bracelets were annually offered to Ammarik and Aštabi. A single instance of a mace being offered to him is also known. He was one of the gods associated with figurines of silver human-faced bulls according to the Eblaite texts, the other ones being Hadda, Resheph and Hadabal. In one offering list Ammarik appears alongside some of the most commonly mentioned Eblaite gods, such as Aštabi, Hadabal (of Luban), Ala (of Zik), Resheph (of Si'am) and Hadda.

Ammarik, as well as an otherwise unknown deity named Dunnān, appear in an Eblaite incantation imploring the weather god Hadda to destroy evil with hail. Ammarik is specifically asked to help Hadda destroy snakes. Daniel Schwemer notes that if the common assumption about Ammarik's character is correct, this might be the oldest attestation of an association between weather gods and mountains in the entire region.

=== Hurrian and Hittite reception ===
Alfonso Archi proposes that after the fall of Ebla Ammarik was among the deities who did not retain their former position in the religion of the Amorites, who became the dominant culture in Syria. He lists Adamma, Aštabi, Šanugaru and Halabatu as other similar examples. He assumes that they were reduced to the status of deities of at best local significance, and as a result were easily incorporated into the religion of the Hurrians when they arrived in the same area a few centuries later. Ammarik is attested in Hurrian texts from Hattusa.

Ḫattušili I brought a statue of a storm god named Armaruk in Hittite from conquered Hurrian city Haššuwa. Armaruk or "lord of Armaruk" corresponds to Ammarik.
