= Kiaše =

Hurrian sea god

- Hurrian god of the sea
- Affiliation: Kumarbi
- Abode: The sea

Genealogy
- Children: Šertapšuruḫi

Equivalents
- Ugaritic: Yam
- Hittite: Aruna

Kiaše, also spelled Kiaže or Kiyaši was a Hurrian deity representing the sea. Sometimes in modern scholarship, he is simply referred to as "the Sea" or "the Sea God."

Based on evidence from Ugarit, Alalakh and Hattusa, it is assumed that he was an actively worshiped deity, similar to his Ugaritic equivalent, Yam. In myths he typically appears as an ally of Kumarbi and thus opponent of Teshub and Shaushka.

== Name ==
The name Kiaše is an ordinary Hurrian noun meaning "sea." It was written as ki-a-še, sometimes with the divine determinative preceding it, or as kyḏ in the alphabetic Ugaritic script. As attested by the existence of two separate writings of the theophoric name of a Hurrian woman from Alalakh, Agap-kiaše, it could be represented not only syllabically, but also logographically (A.BA.BA.). The same logogram was sometimes used to represent the Ugaritic word ym, which likewise corresponds to the name of a sea deity, Yam.

== Worship ==
The worship of the sea is attested in Hurrian texts from Hattusa and from Ugarit. A hymn to Teshub from Halab (modern Aleppo) also mentions Kiaše among the invoked deities. Yet another ritual text (KUB 27.38) mentions him alongside deified kings and the mountain gods Ḫazzi and Namni.

Song of the Sea, a text dealing with the eponymous god, was performed during a celebration connected to Mount Hazzi according to a ritual text (KUB 44.7).

Both feminine and masculine Hurrian personal names containing the word kiaše are known, with some examples from Alalakh being Agap-kiaše (f), Ewri-kiaše (m) and Wandi-kiaše (m). Similar names are also known from Ugarit and from other areas which were inhabited by Hurrian communities.

=== Sea in religion of other ancient Near Eastern cultures ===
As noted by Aaron Tugendhaft, the position of the deified sea was similar in the pantheons of the Hurrians and in Ugarit, but not in Mesopotamia. Daniel Schwemer considers the Hurrian sea god and the Ugaritic Yam to be equivalents. Both Kiaše and Yam appear in god lists and as actively worshiped deities in ritual texts. In contrast, in Mesopotamia the evidence for worship of the sea and for personification of this part of nature is relatively scarce. In Enuma Elish, the name of the monstrous sea personification Tiamat is written without the divine determinative, and she is otherwise mostly attested in explanatory texts depending on this myth. Deified sea, ^{d}A.BA.BA, also occurs in the Theogony of Dunnu, and is identified as a female figure. According to Wilfred G. Lambert, this text is likely late, with the only known copy written in the neo-Babylonian or Persian period, and at least one of the figures appearing in it, Ḫamurnu ("Heaven") has Hurrian origin. ^{d}A.BA.BA is not present in any Mesopotamian god lists. However, a god named Lugala'abba (Sumerian: "lord of the sea") does appear in the god list An = Anum, and it is assumed that he was an underworld deity. He was worshiped in Nippur during the reign of Samsu-iluna. Further Mesopotamian deities associated with the sea were Laguda, a god associated with the Persian Gulf, and Sirsir, associated with sailors.

The sea was also worshiped by the Hittites, who likewise represented it as a male deity, Aruna, in myths. As this word has no plausible Indo-European etymology, Gernot Wilhelm proposes that it was borrowed from Hattic. Aruna is also the name applied to the sea in the Hittite translation of the Kumarbi cycle. It seems more than one sea was venerated in Hittite religion - the "Great Sea" can be identified with the Mediterranean Sea, but the "tarmana sea" remains unidentified.

== Mythology ==
According to the myth Song of Hedammu, Kiaše's daughter was Šertapšuruḫi. Gernot Wilhelm proposes that her names should be interpreted as "belonging to Šertapšuri," Šertapšuri being an otherwise unknown term or divine name. In an early scholarly article, Michael C. Astour characterized her as "a young person of impressive dimensions." In addition to highlight the size, the myth also compares her to sweet cream.

Kiaše's sukkal (attendant deity) was Impaluri. Volkert Haas notes that the suffix -luri appears in the names of the mountain goddess Lelluri, the primordial giant Upelluri, and also in some Hurrian mountain and stone names.

According to Gernot Wilhelm, many myths about the personified sea known from Hittite translations have Hurrian or Syrian origin. One example of Hurrian texts known largely from their Hittite translations is the Kumarbi cycle, consisting out of Song of Kumarbi, Song of LAMMA, Song of Silver, Song of Hedammu and Song of Ullikummi.

In the Song of Hedammu, Kiaše makes an appearance as an ally of Kumarbi and meets with him in his dwelling to propose the marriage with his daughter to him. This alliance is part of a pattern present in all parts of the cycle - the allies of Teshub are gods associated chiefly in the sky, like Shaushka or Shimige, while Kumarbi cooperates with gods of the underworld and the sea. The eponymous Hedammu is a monster born from her union of Kiaše's daughter with Kumarbi. The sea god makes another appearance after Teshub's sister Shaushka discovers the monster - Kumarbi's sukkal Mukišanu summons him for another meeting with his master, and warns him to travel underground to avoid being spotted by Teshub and his allies. After the sea's arrival two of them participate in a feast together, but the rest of the scene is not preserved, and the next fragment describes a meeting between Teshub and Shaushka instead.

The sea god also appears in the Song of Ullikummi, in which he advises Kumarbi, much like in the Song of Hedammu. In this myth, however, it is his sukkal Impaluri who asks Kumarbi to meet with his master, who seemingly does not understand why the latter is angry. Meindert Dijkstra proposes that Šertapšuruḫi also reappears, possibly as one of the midwives mentioned during the birth of Ullikummi, the eponymous antagonist, presumably acting alongside Hutena and Hutellura. The role Kiaše plays in Song of Ullikummi is one of its features used to argue that the connection between it and the Song of Hedammu was particularly close. Noga Ayali-Darshan notes that despite Kiaše's alliance with Kumarbi, a sea wave delivers information about Ullikummi to Shaushka, which might indicate that more than one tradition regarding the sea was combined by the compiler of this text.

Another Hurrian myth involving the sea was the Song of the Sea. Two texts, a ritual instruction prescribing the singing of Song of the Sea and an ancient literary catalog, attest its existence. A number of fragments of Hurrian texts are assumed to belong to it, but nothing can be said about the plot with certainty, other than that the sea, Kumarbi and the so-called "primordial deities" played some role in it. According to Ian Rutherford, this myth was either a description of the origin of the eponymous god, an account of a primordial flood, or perhaps of a conflict between the weather god Teshub and the sea god. He considers the third option to be the most likely, due to the location connected to the myth, the presence of vocabulary associated with the act of vanquishing enemies of the gods, and the presence of Kumarbi and his allies, the "primordial deities." Mount Hazzi, in connection with which the Song of the Sea was ritually performed, was another name for mount Saphon known from Ugaritic texts, where the conflict between the weather god Baal and the sea god Yam took place in the Baal Cycle.

It has been proposed that Song of the Sea was a part of the Kumarbi cycle, but this remains uncertain. It is possible that it can be placed either right before Song of Hedammu, with defeat at the hands of Teshub motivating Kiaše to offer Kumarbi his daughter in marriage, or between the Song of Kumarbi and Song of LAMMA, in which case it would document Teshub's gradual rise to power.

Further allusions to conflict between Teshub and the sea are present elsewhere in Hurro-Hittite literature: in the myth of Shaushka and Pišaišapḫi, the latter god in return for sparing him in spite of his misdeeds promises to tell her the story of Teshub's victory over the sea and the subsequent rebellion of the mountain gods against him. Ian Rutherford notes that the myth seemingly alludes to the mountain gods using the same weapon which Teshub used to defeat the sea god with to fight him, possibly indicating they stole it. These motifs have no parallel in the myths about Baal's combat with Yam.

Another fragmentary text of Hurrian origin relays that at one point the sea caused a flood which reached the heavens, and demanded tribute of gold, silver and lapis lazuli from the gods, with Kumarbi possibly urging the other deities to pay. The deity who brings the tribute to the sea is the "Queen of Nineveh," Shaushka (^{d}IŠTAR). It is possible that this is simply a fragment of the Song of the Sea, rather than an independent composition. It has been pointed out that it resembles an Egyptian composition about the goddess Astarte and the sea, known from the so-called "Astarte papyrus," though the latter bears similarities to the Baal Cycle as well. Noga Ayali-Darshan notes that it is likely based on a composition originally transmitted in a Western Semitic language (though it is not necessarily the Ugaritic Baal Cycle), rather than in Hurrian, as the personified sea is referred to as Ym rather than Kiaše.

Fragmentary Hittite version of the Epic of Gilgamesh mentions the personified sea, seemingly accompanied by his Hurrian sukkal Impaluri. While Gilgamesh bows down to the god and blesses him and his minions, he is cursed in response. Gary Beckman assumes that this episode reflected the sea's more pronounced role in the mythology of inhabitants of ancient Anatolia. He notes that multiple Hurrian and Hittite additions differentiating from the standard Babylonian version are known, indicating that the epic was sometimes adapted to suit sensibilities of non-Mesopotamian audiences.

== Bibliography ==
- Astour, Michael C. (1968). "Semitic Elements in the Kumarbi Myth: An Onomastic Inquiry". Journal of Near Eastern Studies. 27 (3). University of Chicago Press: 172–177. doi:10.1086/371961. ISSN 0022-2968. JSTOR 543532. S2CID 162314168.
- Ayali-Darshan, Noga (2015). "The Other Version of the Story of the Storm-god's Combat with the Sea in the Light of Egyptian, Ugaritic, and Hurro-Hittite Texts". Journal of Ancient Near Eastern Religions. 15 (1). Brill: 20–51. doi:10.1163/15692124-12341268. ISSN 1569-2116.
- Beckman, Gary (2003). "Gilgamesh in Ḫatti". Hittite Studies in Honor of Harry A. Hoffner Jr. on the Occasion of His 65th Birthday. Penn State University Press. pp. 37–58. doi:10.1515/9781575065434-006. hdl:2027.42/77471. ISBN 9781575065434.
- Dijkstra, Meindert (2012). "Ishtar seduces the Sea-serpent. A New Join in the Epic of Hedammu (KUB 36, 56+95) and its meaning for the battle between Baal and Yam in Ugaritic Tradition". Ugarit-Forschungen. Band 43. Münster: Ugarit Verlag. ISBN 978-3-86835-086-9. OCLC 1101929531.
- Frantz-Szabó, Gabrielle (1980), "Impaluri", Reallexikon der Assyriologie (in German)
- Haas, Volkert (2015). Geschichte der hethitischen Religion. Handbook of Oriental Studies. Section 1: The Near and Middle East (in German). Brill. ISBN 978-90-04-29394-6.
- Hoffner, Harry (1998). Hittite myths. Atlanta, GA: Scholars Press. ISBN 0-7885-0488-6. OCLC 39455874.
- Lambert, Wilfred G. (2013). Babylonian creation myths. Winona Lake, Indiana: Eisenbrauns. ISBN 978-1-57506-861-9. OCLC 861537250.
- Polvani, Anna Maria (2008). "The god Eltara and the Theogony" (PDF). Studi micenei ed egeo-anatolici. 50 (1): 617–624. ISSN 1126-6651.
- Rutherford, Ian (2001). "The Song of the Sea (SA A-AB-BA SIR_{3}). Thoughts on KUB 45.63". Akten des IV. Internationalen Kongresses für Hethitologie: Würzburg, 4.-8. Oktober 1999. Wiesbaden: Harrassowitz. ISBN 3-447-04485-3. OCLC 49721937.
- Schwemer, Daniel (2001). Die Wettergottgestalten Mesopotamiens und Nordsyriens im Zeitalter der Keilschriftkulturen: Materialien und Studien nach den schriftlichen Quellen (in German). Wiesbaden: Harrassowitz. ISBN 978-3-447-04456-1. OCLC 48145544.
- Taracha, Piotr (2009). Religions of Second Millennium Anatolia. Harrassowitz. ISBN 978-3447058858.
- Tugendhaft, Aaron (2011). "On ym and ^{d}A.AB.BA at Ugarit". Ugarit-Forschungen. Band 42. Münster: Ugarit Verlag. ISBN 978-3-86835-053-1. OCLC 1101873880.
- Wilhelm, Gernot (1997), "Meer B. Bei den Hethitern", Reallexikon der Assyriologie (in German)
- Wilhelm, Gernot (2011), "Šertapšuruḫi", Reallexikon der Assyriologie (in German)
