= Teshub =

Hurrian weather god and king of the gods

- Weather god, king of the gods
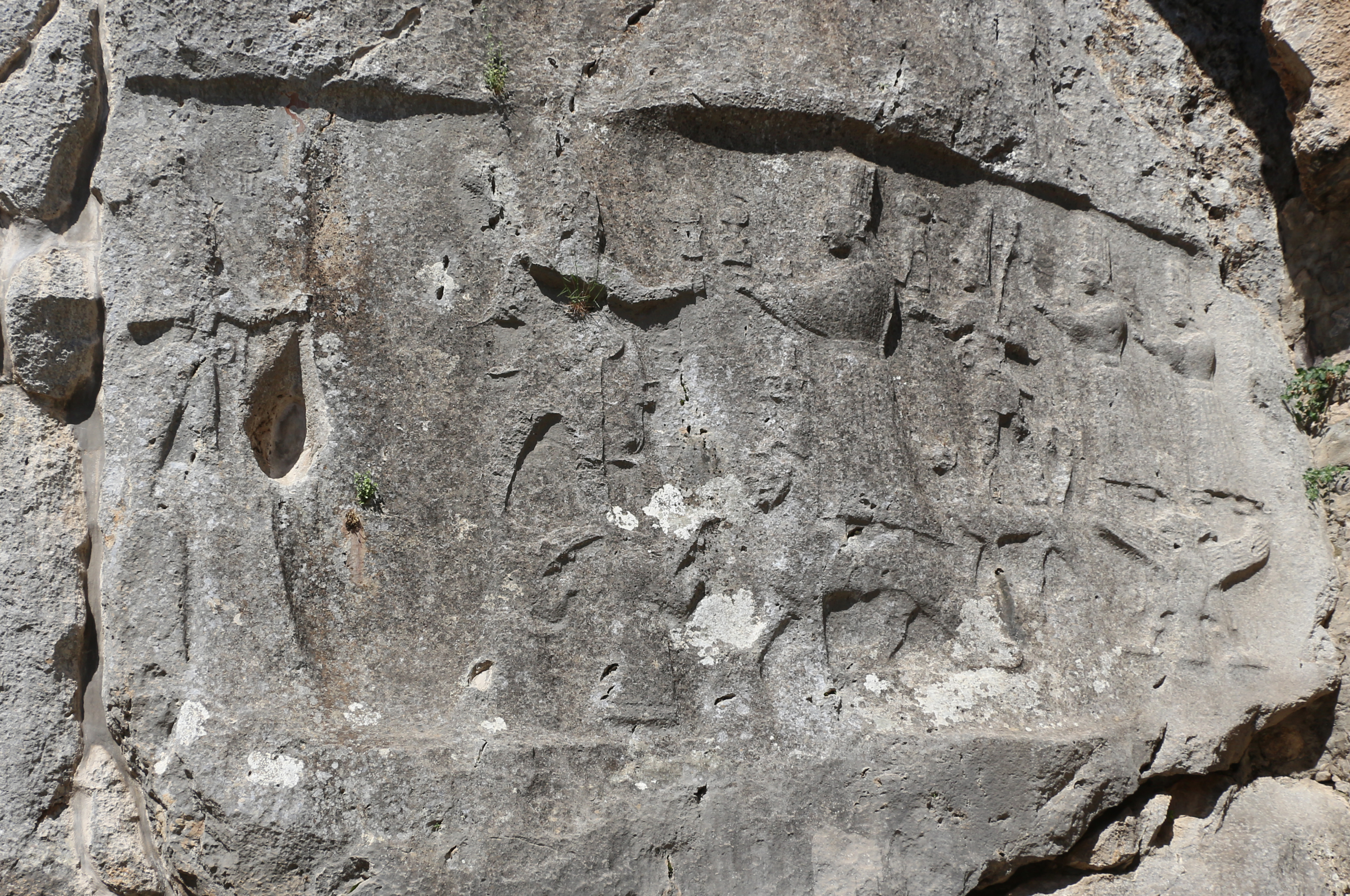
- A relief from Yazılıkaya depicting Teshub (left), Ḫepat and their children and servants.
- Major cult center: Kumme, Arrapḫa, Aleppo, Kaḫat, Kummanni
- Weapon: weather phenomena
- Animals: bull
- Mount: chariot pulled by Šeri and Ḫurri

Genealogy
- Parents: Anu and Kumarbi
- Siblings: Šauška, Tašmišu, Aranzaḫ
- Spouse: Ḫepat
- Children: Šarruma, Allanzu, Kunzišalli

Equivalents
- Mesopotamian: Adad
- Ugaritic: Baal
- Hittite: Tarḫunna
- Luwian: Tarḫunz
- Urartian: Teišeba

Teshub was the Hurrian weather god, as well as the head of the Hurrian pantheon. The etymology of his name is uncertain, though it is agreed it can be classified as linguistically Hurrian. Both phonetic and logographic writings are attested. As a deity associated with the weather, Teshub could be portrayed both as destructive and protective. Individual weather phenomena, including winds, lightning, thunder and rain, could be described as his weapons. He was also believed to enable the growth of vegetation and create rivers and springs. His high position in Hurrian religion reflected the widespread importance of weather gods in northern Mesopotamia and nearby areas, where in contrast with the south agriculture relied primarily on rainfall rather than irrigation. It was believed that his authority extended to both mortal and other gods, both on earth and in heaven. However, the sea and the underworld were not under his control. Depictions of Teshub are rare, though it is agreed he was typically portrayed as an armed, bearded figure, sometimes holding a bundle of lightning. One such example is known from Yazılıkaya. In some cases, he was depicted driving in a chariot drawn by two sacred bulls.

According to Song of Emergence, Teshub was born from the split skull of Kumarbi after he bit off the genitals of Anu during a conflict over kingship. This tradition is also referenced in other sources, including a hymn from Aleppo and a Luwian inscription. A single isolated reference to the moon god Kušuḫ being his father instead is also known. In individual texts various deities could be referred to as his siblings, including Šauška, Tašmišu and Aranzaḫ. His wife was Ḫepat, a goddess originally worshipped in Aleppo at some point incorporated into the Hurrian pantheon. Their children were Šarruma, Allanzu and Kunzišalli. Other deities believed to belong to the court of Teshub included Tenu, Pentikalli, the bulls Šeri and Ḫurri and the mountain gods Namni and Ḫazzi. Members of his entourage were typically enumerated in so-called kaluti, Hurrian offering lists. God lists indicate that Teshub could be recognized as the equivalent of other weather gods worshipped in Mesopotamia and further west in Syria, including Adad and Ugaritic Baal. In Anatolia he also influenced Hittite Tarḫunna and Luwian Tarḫunz, though all of these gods were also worshipped separately from each other.

The worship of Teshub is first attested in the Ur III period, with the early evidence including Hurrian theophoric names and in a royal inscription from Urkesh. Later sources indicate that his main cult center was the city of Kumme, which has not yet been located with certainty. His other major sacred city was Arrapḫa, the capital of an eponymous kingdom located in the proximity of modern Kirkuk in Iraq. Both of these cities were regarded as religious centers of supraregional significance, and a number of references to Mesopotamian rulers occasionally sending offerings to them are known. In the Mitanni empire, the main site associated with him was Kaḫat in northern Syria. In Kizzuwatna in southeastern Turkey he was worshipped in Kummanni. Furthermore, due to Hurrian cultural influence he came to be viewed as the weather god of Aleppo. He was also worshipped in many other Hurrian cities, and in the second half of the second millennium BCE he was the deity most commonly invoked in Hurrian theophoric names, with numerous examples identified in texts from Nuzi. He is also attested as a commonly worshipped deity in the Ugaritic texts, which indicate that Hurrian and local elements were interconnected in the religious practice of this city. Additionally, he was incorporated into Hittite religion and Luwian religion. His hypostasis associated with Aleppo attained particular importance in this context.

Multiple Hurrian myths focused on Teshub are known. Most of them are preserved in Hittite translations, though the events described in them reflect Hurrian, rather than Hittite, theology. Many of them focus on Teshub's rise to the position of the king of the gods and his conflict with Kumarbi and his allies, such as the sea monster Ḫedammu, the stone giant Ullikummi or the personified sea. These texts are conventionally referred to as the Kumarbi Cycle, though it has been pointed out that Teshub is effectively the main character in all of them, leading to occasional renaming proposals. Teshub is also a major character in the Song of Release, whose plot focuses on his efforts to secure the liberation of the inhabitants of Igingalliš from Ebla. Two of the preserved passages additionally deal with his meetings with Ishara, the tutelary goddess of the latter city, and Allani, the queen of the underworld. Interpretation of the narrative as a whole and its individual episodes remain matters of scholarly debate. Additional references to him have been identified in a number of literary texts focused on human heroes, including the tale of Appu and the Hurrian adaptation of the Epic of Gilgamesh.

== Name ==
Multiple romanizations of the name Teshub are in use in Assyriological and Hittitological literature, including Teššub, Tešub, Teššob and Teššop. The transcription of the voiceless sibilants is a modern convention which reflects the common cuneiform spellings of the name, but writings with not only š, but also s and ṯ are all attested in various scripts. Texts from Nuzi record multiple syllabic spellings, including the most common te-šub, as well as te-šu-ub, te-eš-šub and te-eš-šu-ub, and rare te_{9}-šub, te-eš_{15}-šu-ub and te-su-ub, the last of which is only attested once in the entire corpus. Additional shortened forms, such as Te, Tē, Teya or Tēya, were used in the writing of theophoric names. It has been suggested that their development can be compared to the possible derivation of the hypocoristic suffixes še and šeya from the word šēna, “brother”. In names from Alalakh it was rendered as te-eš-šu-ub. In Mitanni letters it is written as ^{d}te-eš-šu-ub-bá-. This form seemingly reflects the pronunciation /Teššob/. Attestations of uncommon variants with the suffix -a are limited to theophoric names from various sites. In the Ugaritic alphabetic script the name was consistently rendered as tṯb (𐎚𐎘𐎁), with only a single attestation of a different variant, tṯp (𐎚𐎘𐎔). Dennis Pardee vocalizes this form of the name as Teṯṯub. Multiple variants occur in the texts from the same city written in standard syllabic cuneiform, for example te-šab, te-šub, ^{d}IŠKUR-ub and ^{d}10-ub. In Luwian hieroglyphs, the name could be rendered as ti-su-pi (Yazılıkaya) or DEUSFORTIS-su-pa-sa (Tell Ahmar), with an additional shortened form, TONITRUS-pa-sá/ti-sa-pa, Tispa or Tisapa, attested in theophoric names from Carchemish.

The precise etymology of Teshub's name is unknown, but it is assumed it has Hurrian origin. Volkert Haas suggested it was derived from the adjective teššai, which he translates as “high” or “lordly”. However, Daniel Schwemer points out that this proposal does not provide an explanation of the suffix, and that teššai is not an actually attested word. Marie Claude Trémouille notes that while a connection with the term tešš-, attested as an equivalent of the Sumerian title ugula (“overseer”), has been suggested, the evidence remains unconvincing.

=== Logographic writings ===
In addition to phonetic syllabic spellings, Teshub's name could be represented in cuneiform by the sumerogram ^{d}IŠKUR. The same sign could also be read as /im/, “wind” or “storm”. Therefore, the sumerogram is sometimes rendered as ^{d}IM in Assyriological literature, though the transcription ^{d}IŠKUR is considered preferable. The use of logograms of Sumerian and Akkadian origin to represent the names of various deities was widespread across the ancient Near East. ^{d}IŠKUR is first documented as the representation of the name of a different weather god than Ishkur in the case of Adad in pre-Sargonic texts from Mari, though this scribal convention was unknown further west, in Ebla, in the same period. (Note: By the Old Babylonian period these two gods were effectively regarded as two names of the same deity in Mesopotamia.) In some cases it is uncertain which deity was represented by ^{d}IŠKUR, for example a theophoric name from Alalakh, a-RI-^{d}IŠKUR, might invoke either Teshub or Adad. The identity of the weather god worshipped in Nuzi and other nearby cities is also ambiguous in some cases due to use of logograms and the presence of speakers of both Hurrian and Akkadian in the area. It has been noted that speakers of Semitic languages and Hurrians might have in some cases read the logogram differently. While in theophoric names it is generally advised to render it according to the linguistic affinity of the other component, the existence of unusual bilingual hybrid names have been noted, one example being Ikūn-Teššub.

A further attested logographic writing of Teshub's name is ^{d}10, though it started to be used later than ^{d}IŠKUR. This logogram is sometimes rendered as ^{d}U in modern literature due to the cuneiform sign having both of these values depending on context. However, Marie Claude Trémouille argues this transcription is erroneous in this case. The use of this numeral to render the names of weather gods is first documented for Adad in the fifteenth century BCE. This convention might have originated in Northern Mesopotamia or in Syria, but Daniel Schwemer argues that it also cannot be ruled out it was a Babylonian tradition in origin, and that at the very least it must have developed as an addition to the well attested system of using other numerals to represent Mesopotamian theonyms (30 for Sin, 20 for Shamash).

Two logograms were used to refer to Teshub in hieroglyphic Luwian inscriptions, ^{DEUS}L.318 and ^{DEUS}FORTIS; they differ from the default weather god logogram in this writing system, ^{DEUS}TONITRUS.

=== Confirmed and disputed cognates ===
It is agreed that Teshub's name is a cognate of the Urartian theonym Teišeba. This god is only attested in sources from the first millennium BCE. Urartian and Hurrian belonged to the same language family as Hurro-Urartian languages, but they already separated in the third millennium BCE, and Teišeba's presence in the Urartian pantheon cannot be considered the result of the language descending from Hurrian. In contrast with Teshub's status in Hurrian religion, he was not the head of the pantheon, but rather the second most important god after Ḫaldi, though according to Daniel Schwemer this should be considered a secondary development.

It has also been proposed that a connection existed between the names of Teshub and Tishpak, a Mesopotamian god regarded as the city deity of Eshnunna. This hypothesis was originally formulated by Thorkild Jacobsen in 1932, but by the 1960s he had abandoned it himself, and instead started to advocate interpreting Tishpak's name as a derivative of Akkadian šapāku, to be translated as “the down-pouring one”. However, this etymology is not regarded as plausible today. More recently, support for the view that Tishpak might have been related to Teshub has been voiced by Alfonso Archi, who suggests the Mesopotamian god developed through reception of the Hurrian one in the Diyala area. Manfred Krebernik instead classifies the name of Tishpak as Elamite. Marten Stol also tentatively describes it as such. Daniel Schwemer states that there is presently no evidence confirming the identification of Teshub and Tishpak as related deities.

== Character ==
The two primary roles assigned to Teshub in Hurrian religion were those of a weather god and of the king of the gods. He was regarded both as a destructive figure and as a protector of mankind. He controlled thunder and lightning. In myths, various weather phenomena, including storms, lightning, rain and wind, function as his weapons. He was responsible for securing the growth of vegetation by sending rain. As an extension of his link with vegetation and agriculture, he could be connected with rivers. A Hurro-Hittite ritual (CTH 776) refers to him as the creator of rivers and springs.

The high status of weather gods in Upper Mesopotamia, Syria and Anatolia reflected the historical reliance on rainfall in agriculture. In contrast, in southern Mesopotamia, where it depended chiefly on irrigation, the weather god (Ishkur/Adad) was a figure of comparatively smaller significance. Teshub's royal authority was believed to extend to both gods and mortals. According to Hurrian tradition his domain included both the heavens and the earth, but the sea and the underworld were areas hostile to him. He was accordingly referred to as the “lord of heaven and earth” (EN AN ú KI). This epithet might be derived from a Syrian tradition. The two most common titles applied to him were ewri, “lord”, and šarri, “king”. The context in which the term ewri was used was different from that of šarri, as the former referred to ordinary historical rulers as well, while the latter was limited to the sphere of myth. Further related epithets of Teshub include šarri talawoži, “great king” and šarri ennāže, “king of the gods”. It is also known that one of the ceremonies in honor of him revolved around the concept of šarrašši, “kingship”. A single text refers to him as eni ennāže, “god of the gods”.

Piotr Taracha argues that Teshub was initially not the head of the Hurrian pantheon, and only reached this position as a part of what he understands as a broader phenomenon of growing prominence of weather gods in the early second millennium BCE. (Note: Taracha argues that the replacement of Anna by a weather god in the role of the tutelary deity of Kanesh to be another example of this phenomenon.) Gernot Wilhelm similarly considers it a possibility that he acquired this role in the beginning of the second millennium BCE. However, Daniel Schwemer argues that Teshub's status as the supreme deity of the Hurrian pantheon belonged to him since the dawn of recorded history, and arguments on the contrary lack solid proof. He points out that the small number of early theophoric names invoking him cannot be necessarily used as evidence, as other major Hurrian deities, such as Šauška or Kumarbi, are not attested in the early Hurrian onomasticon at all, and non-theophoric names predominate. (Note: However, a variant form of Šauška’s name does appear in Sumerian theophoric names from the Ur III period, Geme-Šauša, Lu-Šauša and Ur-Šauša.) Support for Schwemer's views has been voiced by Alfonso Archi. (Note: In an earlier article, Archi instead assumed Teshub initially was not the main god in the Hurrian pantheon, and only replaced Kumarbi in this role at some point as reflected by later mythology.)

== Iconography ==
Depictions of Teshub are rare. The identification of individual weather gods in the art of the ancient Near East is considered difficult, and according to Albert Dietz in many cases is outright impossible. It has been suggested that Teshub was typically depicted dressed in a short skirt and pointed shoes, sometimes standing on a bull, mountains or mountain gods. According to Volkert Haas, in glyptic art from Nuzi, he is depicted holding a three-pronged lightning bolt and a curved sword. Textual sources indicate he was believed to travel in a chariot drawn by two bulls. A second animal associated with him might have been the eagle.

In Hittite art, all weather gods, among them Teshub, were depicted similarly, with long hair and beard, dressed in conical headdress decorated with horns, a kilt and shoes with upturned toe area, and with a mace either resting on the shoulder or held in a smiting position. In the Yazılıkaya sanctuary, Teshub is portrayed holding a three-pronged lightning bolt (Note: However, many depictions of a weather god armed with lightning-shaped tridents are later (Neo-Hittite), and represent Luwian Tarḫunz.) in his hand and standing on two mountains, possibly to be identified as Namni and Ḫazzi. He is also depicted on a Neo-Hittite relief from Malatya, where he rides in his chariot drawn with bulls and is armed with a triple lightning bolt.

Frans Wiggermann assumes that some depictions of a weather god accompanied by a naked goddess might represent Teshub and an unidentified deity, rather than Mesopotamian Adad and Shala.

A distinct iconography is attested for the weather god of Aleppo, who could be identified as Teshub. His attribute was an eagle-shaped chariot. It has been suggested that its form was meant to reflect the belief that this vehicle was as fast as the bird it was patterned after and its ability to travel across the sky.

== Associations with other deities ==
=== Family and court ===
Teshub was regarded as the son of Anu and Kumarbi. The former was a deity received from Mesopotamia, and outside of being the father of Teshub did not play a major role in Hurrian religion. The circumstances of the weather god's birth are known from the Song of Emergence, which relays how Kumarbi bit off the genitals of Anu during a battle over kingship in heaven, and how his skull had to be split to let his son out. A Hurrian hymn (KUB 47.78) also alludes to the events known from this myth, referring to Anu as Teshub's father and Kumarbi as his mother:

You are the strong one, which I (praise), the bull calf of Anu! You are the strong one, which I (praise), your father Anu begot you, your mother Kumarbi brought you to life. For the city of Aleppo I summon him, Teššop, for the pure throne.

A single text, KUB 33,89+, preserves a different tradition about Teshub's parentage and refers to the moon god Kušuḫ as his father, but this attestation remains isolated and its broader implications are uncertain. The passage is entirely logographic (^{d}U DUMU ^{d}30), and in the past it has been interpreted as a possible reference to a Hattian tradition instead, with the weather god being Taru and the moon god Kašku, but according to Jörg Klinger this interpretation is not plausible.

The Song of Emergence also states that Tašmišu and Aranzaḫ (the river Tigris) were born alongside Teshub. According to Piotr Taracha the former was specifically regarded as his twin. He also functioned as his divine “vizier” (sukkal). The latter role could also be attributed to Tenu, a god who might have originated in the local tradition of Aleppo. A further deity counted among Teshub's siblings was his sister Šauška. In the Song of ^{d}LAMMA, she addresses him as her younger brother. However, Daniel Schwemer argues that she might have originally been regarded as his spouse. In myths, she is often portrayed assisting Teshub in battle. Beate Pongrats-Leisten argues that Teshub and Šauška, who she treats as interchangeable with Mesopotamian Adad and Ishtar, were already paired in the early Hurrian inscription of Tish-atal, with the goddess Belat-Nagar who occurs in it according to her representing a local hypostasis of Šauška. However, the theory that the tutelary goddess of Nagar was a form of Šauška or Ishtar has been critically evaluated by Joan Goodnick Westenholz, who remarked that these goddesses did not have anything in common with them beyond also being imagined as female figures. (Note: According to Alfonso Archi, the natively Hurrian deity possibly corresponding to Belat-Nagar might have instead been Nabarbi, though her name most likely originally arose independently as a derivative of the word naw, pasture.)

Ḫepat was regarded as Teshub's wife. She was received by the Hurrians from the local pantheon of Aleppo. It is possible that she and Teshub were already paired with each other in Old Babylonian Mari, as indicated by one of the letters sent to king Zimri-Lim. Its sender states in it that she will pray before a weather god designated by the Sumerogram ^{d}IŠKUR and Ḫepat for the king (ARM 10.92, lines 22–23). Ḫepat was already regarded as the spouse of the local weather god, originally known as Hadda, in the third millennium BCE. She was chiefly worshipped in northern Syria, especially in Aleppo and Alalakh, though the area associated with her also encompassed southern Anatolia and the middle Euphrates. It has been suggested that the recognition of the connection between her and Teshub was limited to western Hurrian communities. However, the Mitanni royal family was familiar with her as well, as evidenced by her presence in theophoric names of some of its members, which might indicate she was also recognized as Teshub's wife further east. Despite the connection between her and Teshub, Ḫepat was not referred to with a feminine equivalent of his title, šarri, and her corresponding epithet was allai, “lady”, instead. The deities regarded as their children were Šarruma, Allanzu and Kunzišalli. The first of these three could be referred to as the “bull-calf of Teshub”, though according to Gernot Wilhelm the familial connection between them should be considered a relatively late development.

Pentikalli (Belet-ekallim), a Mesopotamian goddess at some point incorporated into the Hurrian pantheon, could be designated as a “concubine” of Teshub (na-šar-ti-ya ŠA ^{d}IM). Offering lists in some cases mention a solar disk (šapši ḫišammi) dedicated to her. In Hurrian context she could be linked to Pithanu. Volkert Haas, who rendered this theonym as Bitḫanu, translated this name from Akkadian as “the Hanaean (Note: The term Hana originally referred to partially nomadic inhabitants of the Middle Euphrates area) daughter”, and suggested that she was a deified epithet of Belet-ekallim. Both of them appear in a Hittite list of offerings to Teshub of Aleppo. Pithanu is also mentioned in the text KUB 45.28+39.97(+), which states that “down at Teššub’s throne sits Pithanu”. According to Haas, it should be considered a description of the arrangement of statues of deities.

While it has been argued that Ishara might have been the partner (parhedra) of Teshub in Old Babylonian Ebla, as well as in Emar and Alalakh, no evidence supporting this proposal has been identified.

Teshub's chariot was pulled by two bulls, Šeri and Ḫurri. Šeri was believed to mediate between humans and his master, while no distinct role is attested for Ḫurri. In the Song of Ullikummi, he is replaced by Tilla, but this theonym is better attested as the name of a fully independent god popular in Nuzi. According to Daniel Schwemer, the latter was typically not associated with Teshub, and there is no evidence he was imagined as a bull in the areas where his worship is best attested. Two further deities belonging to the circle of Teshub, in offering lists often placed after his bulls, were Namni and Ḫazzi. These mountain gods might have been worshipped alongside him in Aleppo, though no direct evidence in favor of this view exists. The association between mountain gods and weather gods has a long history across Syria and Anatolia, and might be first documented in a text from Ebla which invokes Hadda alongside Ammarik.

Hurrian offering lists, so-called kaluti, preserve long sequences of deities associated with Teshub. The standard version was arranged according to importance and included Teshub himself, as well as deities such as Tašmišu (in Šapinuwa followed by Anu), Kumarbi, Ea, Kušuḫ, Šimige, Šauška, Aštabi, Nupatik, Pirengir, Ḫešui, Iršappa, Tenu, earth and heaven, “mountains and rivers”, Šarruma, Šeri and Ḫurri, Namni and Ḫazzi, “Ugur of Teshub”, “hero of Teshub”, “ancestors of Teshub” (Note: According to Alfonso Archi they are described as the “gods of the father”, a term collectively referring to the ancestors of a given deity.) and various attributes and cultic paraphernalia related to him. Goddesses generally belonged to the kaluti of Ḫepat instead. This separation by gender is presumed to be a Hurrian innovation, and there is no indication that it was instead derived from a Syrian Amorite or pre-Amorite tradition.

=== Syro-Mesopotamian weather gods ===
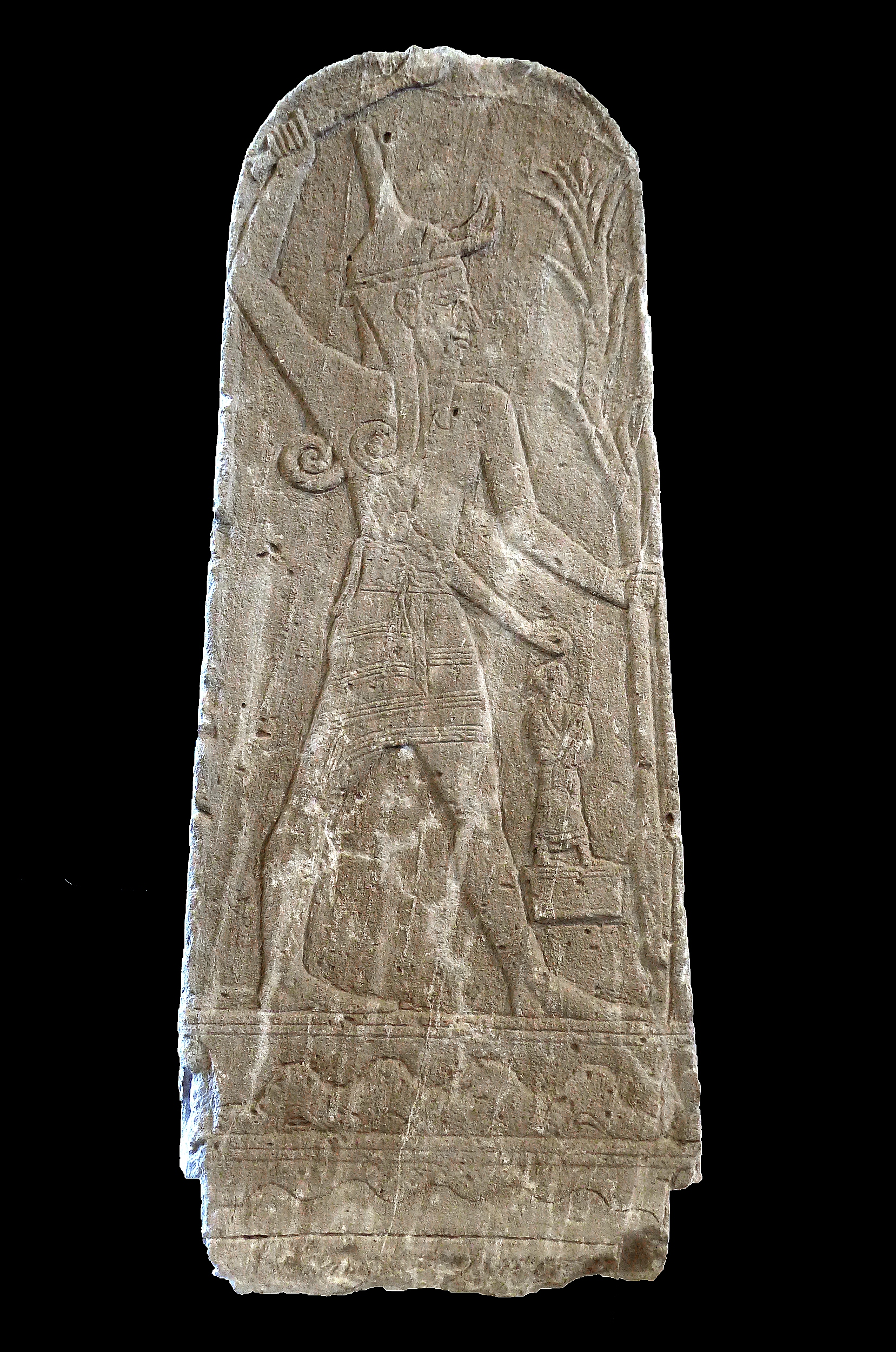
A stela depicting the Ugaritic weather god, Baal, who could be associated with Teshub.

Teshub was considered analogous to the Mesopotamian weather god, Adad. (Note: While Ishkur is attested earlier than Adad in Mesopotamian sources, with the oldest attestations going back to Early Dynastic texts from Adab and Lagash, Adad became the more commonly used name of the weather god in Mesopotamia in the Ur III period.) A degree of syncretism between them occurred across northern Syria and Upper Mesopotamia in the second millennium BCE due to the proliferation of new Hurrian dynasties, and eventually the rise of the empire of Mitanni, but its precise development is not possible to study yet due to lack of sources which could be a basis for case studies. While Hurrian rulers are not absent from sources from the Old Babylonian period, they attained greater relevance from the sixteenth century onwards, replacing the formerly predominant Amorite dynasties. As a result of this process, Teshub came to be regarded as the weather god of Aleppo. However, as Semitic languages continued to be spoken across the region, both names of weather gods continued to be used across the middle Euphrates area.

While the equivalence between Teshub and Adad is not attested in the Mesopotamian god list An = Anum, he is directly referred to as one of his foreign counterparts, specifically that linked to Subartu, (Note: ”Subartu” and its derivatives were terms used by Mesopotamians to refer to Hurrians.) in another similar text, K 2100 (CT 25, 16–17). In a single passage from the Song of Ḫedammu Teshub is addressed with the title “canal inspector of mankind”, which most likely originates in the Babylonian milieu. Anu’s status as the father of Teshub also mirrors Mesopotamian tradition. This idea might have reached the Hurrians as early as in the Akkadian period. Daniel Schwemer notes it is possible that in turn the tradition according to which Adad was a son of Dagan was influenced by Hurrian religion, and was meant to mirror the connection between their Hurrian counterparts, Teshub and Kumarbi, and argues it is “questionable” if it was envisioned similarly before the arrival of the Hurrians. According to Lluís Feliu, while a father-son relationship between Dagan and the weather god is only directly attested in Ugarit, it can be assumed it is already implicit in Old Babylonian texts. Remnants of the period of Hurrian cultural influence are also still visible in a number of Neo-Assyrian traditions pertaining to Adad. The Tākultu texts indicate that his bulls Šeri and Ḫurri were incorporated into the circle of deities associated with Adad in both Assur and Kurbail. The fact that he was invoked alongside Ishtar in contracts is presumed to reflect the association between Teshub and Šauška. Beate Pongratz-Leisten argues an example of Hurrian mythology being reflected in an association between these Mesopotamian deities is already present in a curse formula of Adad-nirari I. At the same time it is considered implausible to assume that the widespread veneration of Adad attested in Assyria in the Middle Assyrian period and later was the result of Hurrian influence, and most likely it should be instead interpreted as a case of cultural continuity, as evidenced by the broad distribution of the evidence for worship of Adad of Assur, attested even in Hittite sources.

In Ugarit, Teshub was identified with the local weather god, Baal. It is presumed that the latter developed through the replacement of the main name of the weather god by his epithet on the Mediterranean coast in the fifteenth century BCE. In modern scholarship, comparisons have been made between myths focused on their respective struggles for kingship among the gods. While Baal does not directly fight against El, the senior god in the Ugaritic pantheon, the relationship between them has nonetheless been compared to the hostility between their Hurrian counterparts, Kumarbi and Teshub. Additionally, similarly to how Baal fought Yam, god of the sea, the Kiaše was also counted among Teshub's mythical adversaries, and both battles were associated with the same mountain, Ḫazzi. However, myths about Baal also contain elements which find no parallel in these focused on Teshub, such as the confrontation with Mot, the personification of death, and his temporary death resulting from it. In contrast with Teshub, Baal also did not have a wife, and in Ugarit Ḫepat was seemingly recognized as a counterpart of Pidray, who was regarded as his daughter, rather than spouse.

For uncertain reasons a trilingual edition of the Weidner god list from Ugarit equates Teshub and Baal not only with each other, but also with the Mesopotamian goddess Imzuanna. As her character was dissimilar, Aaron Tugendhaft has suggested that this connection might be an example of scribal word play, as the first sign of Imzuanna's name is identical with the sumerogram IM used to represent names of weather gods. He concludes that it is unlikely the list can be used as a point of reference for either Hurrian or Ugaritic theology.

It has been argued that the theonyms Teshub and Baal were both used interchangeably to refer to the local weather god in Emar. However, most likely, his principal name in this city was Adad, and Baal served only as an appellative. It is possible that in the local pantheon, the relationship between him and Ashtart was imagined similar to the bond between Teshub and Šauška in Hurrian mythology, as evidence for alleged consort relation between them is lacking.

=== Anatolian weather gods ===
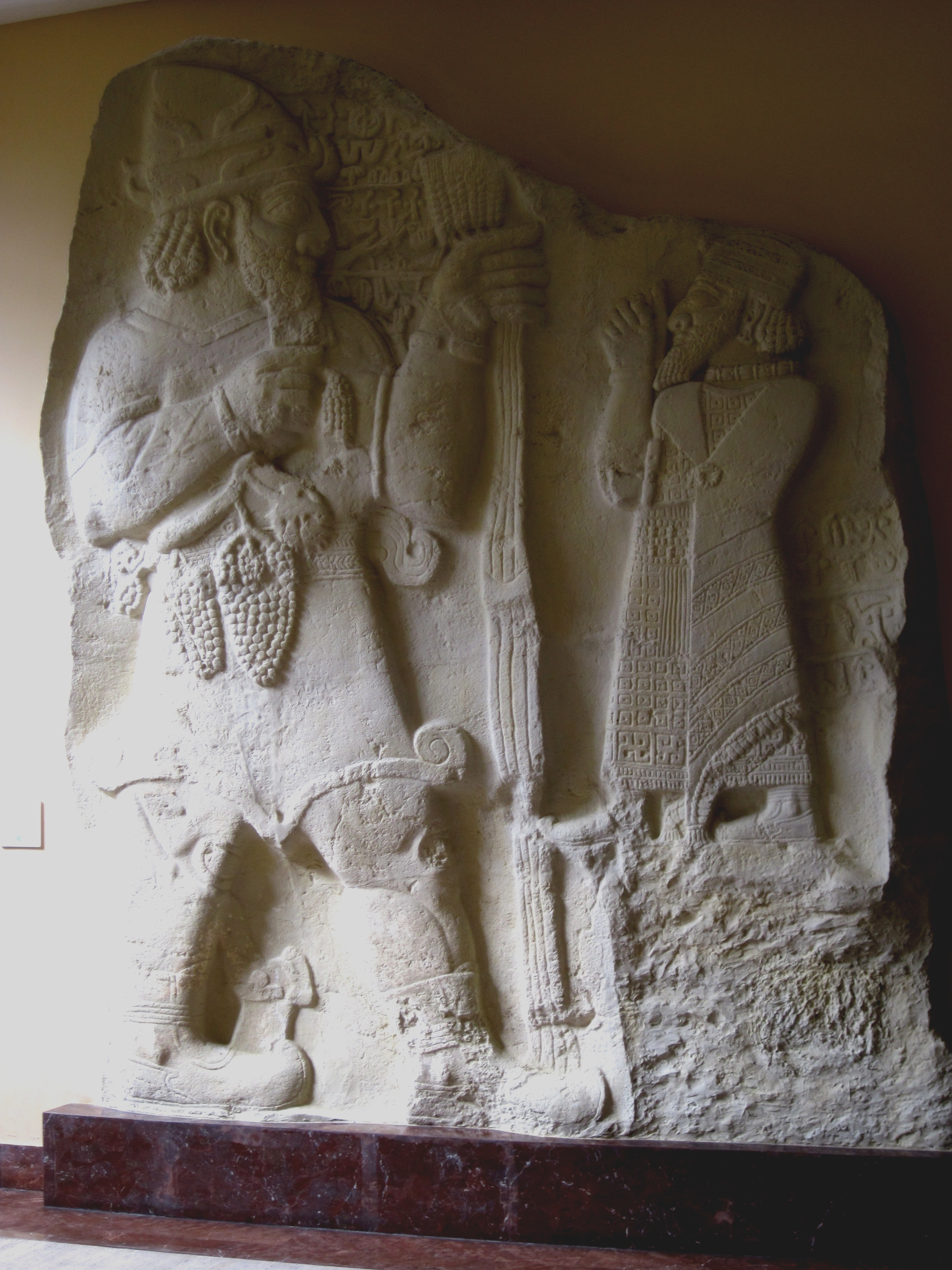
A hypostasis of the Luwian weather god, “Tarḫunz of the vineyard”, as depicted on the İvriz relief.

In Kummanni in Kizzuwatna, Teshub was identified with the local god Manuzi. The latter was regarded as the spouse of the Hurrian goddess Lelluri.

Starting in the Middle Hittite period, the Hittites due to growing Hurrian influence on their culture came to associate Teshub with their weather god, Tarḫunna. The character of the Luwian weather god, Tarḫunz, also came to be influenced by the Teshub. (Note: Both of these cognate theonyms, while etymologically Indo-European, are not cognates of any other Indo-European weather god names, and instead were most likely meant to mirror the name of the Hattian weather god Taru.) A factor facilitating interchange of traits between these Anatolian weather gods, their Hurrian counterpart and other weather deities, such as Hattian Taru and Mesopotamian Adad, was the use of the same sumerogram to represent their names.

In some cases, Hittites adopted Hurrian texts focused on Teshub, including hymns, prayers and myths, but substituted his name for that of their own analogous god. Sources such as ritual texts pertaining to the worship of Šauška in Šamuha instead preserve cases of what according to Piotr Taracha can be described as interpretatio hurritica, namely referring to various Anatolian weather gods with the name Teshub. However, as noted by Gary Beckman, full conflation of deities was rare in Hittite religion, and generally should be considered “late and exceptional”, with individual weather gods maintaining separate identities.

Teshub's bulls were incorporated alongside him into the Hittite pantheon, but it is possible the image of a weather god travelling in a chariot drawn by bulls was not present in Hittite culture exclusively due to Hurrian influence, as the bull was already the symbolic animal of the weather god earlier, in the Old Hittite period. (Note: Luwians instead pictured their weather god as travelling in a chariot drawn by horses.) While in Hittite texts postdating the introduction of Hurrian deities, Teshub might appear alongside Šuwaliyat, who corresponded to Tašmišu, there is no evidence that a connection existed between this Anatolian god and Tarḫunna in earlier periods. Their juxtaposition was influenced by traditions imported from Kizzuwatna. In order to reconcile the standard Hittite pantheon and the dynastic pantheon including Hurrian deities, attempts have also been made by Hittite court theologians to equate Ḫepat and the Sun goddess of Arinna, as attested for example in a prayer of Puduḫepa, but according to Piotr Taracha it is implausible that these ideas found support among the general populace.

In the first millennium BCE, the identification between Teshub and Tarḫunz is implicitly attested in texts from Tabal, where the latter came to be regarded as the husband of Ḫepat. However, according to Manfred Hutter it is not possible to speak of “Luwianized” form of the worship of this goddess in earlier periods. Through Luwian influence she was worshipped alongside Tarḫunz in Carchemish as well, but she was not incorporated into the religion of the Arameans and eventually gradually disappeared from sources from Syria over the course of the eighth and seventh centuries BCE. It is also possible that the echoes of the myth about Teshub's birth are preserved in a hieroglyphic Luwian inscription from Arsuz, which names the male deity Kumarma as Tarḫunz's mother similarly to how a Hurrian hymn refers to Kumarbi as Teshub's mother due to the circumstances of his birth.

== Worship ==
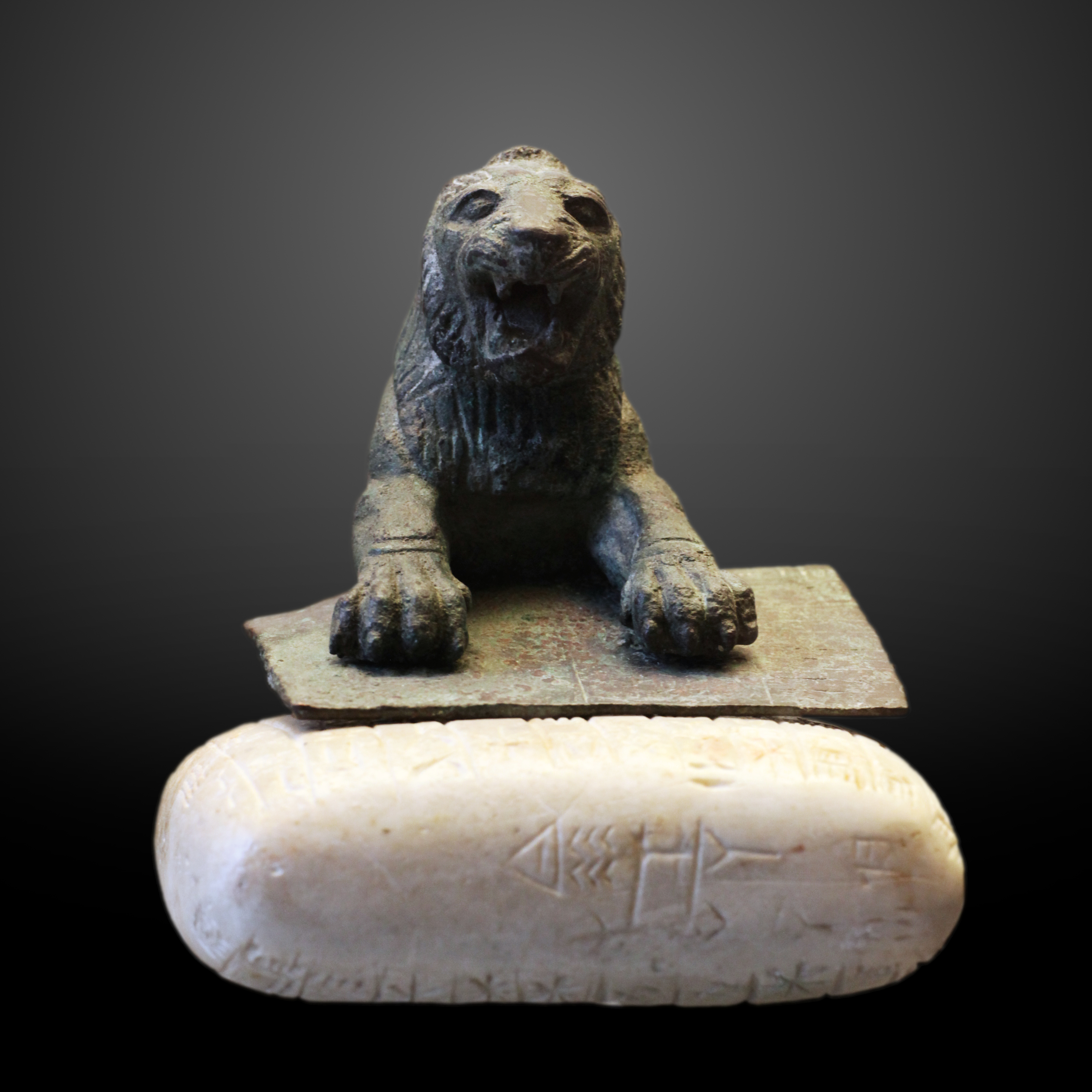
A foundation peg in the form of a lion from Urkesh with the inscription of Tish-atal. Louvre.

Teshub was one of the oldest Hurrian deities. He is considered a “pan-Hurrian” god. As such, he was worshipped in all areas inhabited by the Hurrians, from southeastern Anatolia to the Zagros Mountains, similarly to deities such as Šauška, Šimige, Kušuḫ and Kumarbi. He is first attested in Hurrian theophoric names from the Ur III period. The single oldest example is Teššop-šelag (te-šup-še-la-aḫ; translation of the second element is unknown), identified in a document from Puzrish-Dagan from the seventh year of Shu-Sin’s reign. It is also presumed that the sumerogram representing a weather god in the inscription of Tish-atal of Urkesh should be interpreted as an early reference to Teshub. According to Daniel Schwemer, it can be considered the first direct reference to this god outside of personal names, and dates to the late Ur III period.

Little is known about the history of the cult of Teshub prior to the rise of Hurrian dynasties in Upper Mesopotamia. Theophoric names invoking him were not yet common in the periods predating the time of the Mari archives. In addition to examples from this text corpus, a few are known from Old Babylonian Dilbat, Kish, Sippar, Kisurra, Alalakh, Tell Leilan, Tell al-Rimah and Tell Shemshara. One Old Babylonian example is Teshub-ewre, “Teshub is lord”, presumed to refer to his position as the head of the pantheon. By the fifteenth and fourteenth centuries BCE, Teshub became the deity most commonly invoked in Hurrian theophoric names.

Many royal dynasties across Upper Mesopotamia, Syria and Anatolia considered Teshub their tutelary deity. According to Piotr Taracha, this might have been a result of the influence of the tradition of Yamhad, centered in Aleppo, in which the god confirming royal authority was Adad, later syncretised with Teshub in the west.

=== Kumme ===
Kumme (Akkadian: Kummu or Kummum, Hittite: Kummiya, Urartian: Qumenu) was the main cult center of Teshub. It is also the first attested city associated with him. It is to be distinguished from Kummanni in Kizzuwatna. Its precise location is not known. It is presumed that it was located east of the Tigris, in the valley of the Eastern Khabur. It has been suggested that it is to be found in the immediate proximity of modern Zakho, but according to Karen Radner textual sources indicate a more mountainous environment, which lead her to suggest identification with Beytüşşebap instead. (Note: As of 2012, no excavations were ever performed in the proximity of this settlement.)

The city is already attested in texts from the Old Babylonian period. As a cult center of a weather god, it enjoyed “transregional” renown, comparable to Aleppo. A list of deities invoked in an oath from Mari recognized these two cities as the two main cult centers of weather gods. It forms a part of a treaty between Zimri-Lim and a king of Kurda. A text from the same city written in Hurrian directly refers to Te-šu-ba-am Ku-um-me-né-en, Teshub of Kumme. Zimri Lim also dedicated a vase to the weather god of Kumme; the inscription renders the name logogaphically. In cases where logographic writings are used to spell the name, it is not certain if speakers of Semitic languages (Akkadian and Amorite) necessarily referred to the god of Kumme as Adad or with his Hurrian name.

In some cases, Kumme occurs as a theophoric element in personal names from various Hurrian sites (Nuzi, Tikunani), as well as from Mariote and Middle Assyrian archives, such as Kummen-adal ("Kumme is strong") or Kummen-ewri ("Kumme is lord"), according to Daniel Schwemer possibly functioning as a stand-in for the name of its god. Marie Claude Trémouille interprets this phenomenon similarly, presuming that the name Kummen-atal is to be translated as "(the weather god of) Kumme is strong". However, according to Thomas Richter such names reflect the perception of the city itself as a numen.

The last references to Kumme occur in sources from the Neo-Assyrian period. The weather god of Kumme, whose name was written logographically, was recognized by Assyrian rulers. He is mentioned as ^{d}IŠKUR šá ku-me in the so-called Götteradressbuch, a text listing deities worshipped in Assur, while Adad-nirari II visited the city itself in 895 BCE to make an offering to him. According to Daniel Schwemer, while the king referred to the god of the city as Adad, this should only be considered a case of what he deems "interpretatio assyria" (per analogy with a later religious phenomenon referred to as interpretatio graeca). At the time, Kumme was an independent polity under the control of local rulers. The city's status as a well established religious center might have been the reason why it retained independence. A further Assyrian reference to Kumme occurs in the personal name Bēl-Kumme-ilā’ī. The final fate of the city is uncertain, as it is no longer attested in sources from the reign of Sennacherib and his successors.

=== Kingdom of Arrapḫa ===
The city of Arrapḫa (Arrapḫum) or Āl-ilāni (“city of the gods”), modern Kirkuk, was already known as a cult center of a weather god in the Old Babylonian period. The local temple was considered the most important sanctuary in the area east of the Tigris, in the proximity of Little Zab. It is possible that the local god was understood to be Teshub during the reign of Shamshi-Adad I already. One of his inscriptions refers to sacrifices made during a festival (ḫumṭum) held in Arrapḫa in honor of a weather god and a sun god, and while the sumerograms used are usually interpreted as Adad and Shamash, it is not impossible that the deities meant were Teshub and Šimige. Ultimately it is possible that both Shamshi-Adad I and his successor Yasmah-Addu referred to the god of Arrapḫa as Adad. At the same time, according to Daniel Schwemer he was called Teshub by their contemporaries in Šušarrā, as the local inhabitants, who apparently at one point dedicated two bronze vessels to him, were predominantly Hurrians.

Information about the religion of the kingdom of Arrapḫa, including the structure of local pantheons, is only known from administrative texts, such as lists of rations meant for the cults of specific deities. In lists of oil rations, Teshub always occurs alongside Šauška of Nineveh. It is also known that a festival in honor of a deity designated by the logogram ^{d}IŠKUR took place in the fourth month of the local calendar, corresponding to June or July. While no inscriptions dealing with any building projects or votive offerings related to the worship of Teshub can be attributed to local kings, it is presumed they nonetheless engaged in such activities, and the lack of textual evidence might be accidental.

Teshub is also attested in texts from two other sites in the proximity of Arrapḫa itself, Nuzi (Yorgantepe) and Kurruhanni (Tell al-Fakhar). It is possible that a double temple excavated in the former of these cities was dedicated jointly to him and Šauška. It might have been originally a temple of Ishtar instead, with its later Hurrian character resulting from the settlement of Hurrians in the nineteenth century BCE. Possibly this process was contemporary with the change of the name or refounding of the city, which was originally known as Gasur. Members of Teshub's clergy are mentioned in the Nuzi texts, including šangû priests and entu priestesses. It is also known that he was worshipped in other settlements in the same area, Ḫilmani and Ulamme, as well as in Tilla, possibly identical with the similarly named Tille which based on Old Babylonian records was located in northeastern part of Upper Mesopotamia. In yet another city in the kingdom of Arrapḫa, Šuriniwe, a double temple dedicated jointly to Teshub and the moon god Kušuḫ existed.

The importance of the cult of Teshub in the kingdom of Arrapḫa is reflected in the large number of theophoric names invoking him, including these belonging to members of the highest strata of society. Teshub names predominate even among members of the royal family, with virtually all of the known kings and a half of the princes bearing them. Some of the identified names include Arip-Teshub (“Teshub gave”), Egel-Teshub (“save, Teshub”), Fagar-Teshub (“good is Teshub”), Fand-Teshub (“Teshub makes right”), Ḫižmi-Teshub (“shiny is Teshub”), Kibi-Teshub (“Teshub sent”), Tadip-Teshub (“Teshub loved”), Teshub-adal (“Teshub is strong”), Teshub-ewri (“Teshub is lord”), Teshub-madi (“Teshub [possesses] wisdom”), Tun-Teshub (“Teshub could”), Tuppi-Teshub (“Teshub is here”), Un-Teshub (“Teshub came” or “he [the child] came, o Teshub”), the hypocoristic Teššōya, and uncommon hybrid Hurro-Akkadian names such as Teshub-nirari (“Teshub is my help”) or Warad-Teshub (“servant of Teshub”). It has been noted that similar theophoric names invoking Teshub are also attested in texts from contemporary Assyrian and Babylonian sites, for example Nippur. In texts from this city from the Kassite period, fifteen different examples are attested, which makes Teshub the most common non-Mesopotamian non-Kassite deity appearing in theophoric names from this corpus, and the sixteenth most common overall.

=== Aleppo ===
The temple of the weather god of Aleppo was already considered a major sanctuary in the Eblaite texts, which predate the Sargonic period. In a treaty from Mari, the weather gods of Aleppo and Kumme appear separately from each other as the two most important weather deities invoked. Hurrianization of the site presumably only occurred in the fifteenth and fourteenth centuries BCE. Due to growing Hurrian influence in northern Syria, the deity venerated there, originally Adad, came to be identified as Teshub instead. According to Alfonso Archi, he was effectively superimposed over the older god. For example, a festival originally dedicated to Adad which took place in the month Ḫiyaru was later held in honor of Teshub.

According to Gernot Wilhelm, the hypostasis of Teshub associated with Aleppo became the “most important local variant” of this god, as evidenced by attestations spanning from Hattusa and Ugarit in the west to Nuzi in the east. The Nuzi evidence includes references to ^{d}IŠKUR ḫalba=ġe and to a deity named Ḫalbae or Ḫarbaḫe, “the divine Halabean” (Halab being the Akkadian name of Aleppo), presumably the same figure. In Ugaritic texts written in the local alphabetic script, Teshub of Aleppo appears as tṯb ḫlbġ. Traditions of Aleppo, including those related to Teshub, presumably also reached Kizzuwatna.

The temple of the weather god in Aleppo was renovated around 1100 BCE by a Luwian prince, Taita, who added a relief depicting himself next to an older depiction of the deity, dated to the fourteenth or thirteenth century BCE. It remained in use in later times, but the main deity of the city was no longer Teshub; the local god was instead identified as Tarḫunz in hieroglyphic Luwian inscriptions, Hadad in Aramaic texts, and Adad in Akkadian ones from both Babylonia and Assyria.

=== Kummanni and other Kizzuwatnean sites ===
Teshub was worshipped in Kummanni in the north of Kizzuwatna, a kingdom located in the plains surrounding modern Adana. A number of ritual texts focused on him presumed to come from this area reflected the theology of Aleppo. Sources from Kizzuwatna often link him with ḫamri (^{(é)}ḫa-am-ri), a type of buildings originally associated with oath-taking and judicial procedures in Upper Mesopotamia and in the north of Babylonia, as already attested in the early second millennium BCE. A ḫamri was connected with the cult of Adad in Old Babylonian Shaduppum, but Old Assyrian sources do not connect it with the worship of any weather god. In Hurrian tradition of Kizzuwatna these structures could also be associated with Ishara. There is no indication that ḫamri buildings were a part of temples, and most likely the worship of individual deities in association with them reflected their connection to oaths, justice or omens.

A festival meant to guarantee the well-being of the royal couple dedicated to the gods of Kummanni, including “Teshub Manuzzi”, was later celebrated in the Hittite Empire, but according to copies from the times of Puduḫepa the instructions were passed down from Kizzuwatna.

=== Kaḫat and other Mitanni sites ===
While material evidence of the worship of Teshub in the Mitanni state is limited, it is agreed that it was widespread. Tushratta in the letters he sent to Amenhotep III and Amenhotep IV (part of the Amarna letters corpus) refers to Teshub as his lord, and in a blessing formula invokes the lead deities of the pantheon, him and Šauška, alongside Amun (rendered in Hurrian as “Amanu”), who occupied a comparable position in ancient Egyptian religion. Teshub's major cult centers in Mitanni territory were Kaḫat, Waššukkanni, Uḫušumāni and Irride. His hypostases associated with them are all listed among the witnesses in a treaty of king Shattiwaza (Note: Originally Kili-Teshub; Shattiwaza was a regnal name.) The enumeration of these manifestations, as well as various local deities, had a political dimension, and was meant to help with defining the area regarded as the core territory of the kingdom.

Kaḫat (modern Tell Barri), which was located in the proximity of Shekhna, was the primary site associated with Teshub located in the heartland of the Mitanni state. It was already recognized as a cult center of a weather god during the Old Babylonian period, as early as during the reign of Shamshi-Adad I, but there is no evidence that he was identified as Teshub yet prior to the establishment of a Mitanni presence in the fifteenth century BCE, as documents from the reign of Zimri-Lim indicate the city's rulers were Amorites, rather than Hurrians. In the Shattiwaza treaty, Teshub is designated as the “lord of kurrinnu of Kaḫat”, presumably either a type of house of worship or emblem. Volkert Haas asserted that a reference to “Teshub of kurinni” appears in an inscription from Kaḫat as well, but according to Daniel Schwemer this is an error, as no such a text actually exists. It is known that a temple existed in this city; it occurs for the last time in an inscription of Shalmaneser I commemorating its renovation which refers to the god worshipped in it as Adad. Of the remaining cult centers listed in the same treaty, Waššukkanni was the imperial capital, and might be identical with Sikkāni, attested as a cult center of Adad in Neo-Assyrian sources, Uḫušumāni is not otherwise known, and Irride, whose local hypostasis of Teshub was called the “lord of the kamaru” (presumably a type of emblem or temple, much like kurrinnu) might correspond to Tell Bandar Ḫān. Middle Assyrian sources mention two further cities which might have been Mitanni-affiliated cult centers of Teshub, namely Šura and Isana. The former is only attested in a single source, and might correspond to modern Savur. The text from this site mentions a weather god and a city deity bearing a Hurrian name, Šūriḫa, “belonging to Šūra”.

=== Other Hurrian attestations ===
Numerous names invoking Teshub are known from the texts from Tigunanum, a city located to the north of Tur Abdin and south or southwest of the Tigris whose exact location remains unknown due to the tablets coming from illicit excavations. During the reign of Ḫattušili I, the king of this city bore the theophoric name Tunib-Teššub. Additionally, the so-called Tikunani Prism, which lists the predominantly Hurrian names of men belonging to the king's forces, includes nine theophoric ones invoking Teshub.

Teshub was also worship in Ḫaburātum, a city northeast of the Sinjar Mountains already ruled by a Hurrian king, Nanip-šauri, in the times of Zimri-Lim, though it is presumed that since the name was written logographically in his letters addressed to the latter ruler, their recipient presumably would read the sumerogram used as Adad.

In texts from Tell al-Rimah (Qattara) theophoric names invoking Teshub are attested, but they are rare, with the only examples identified so far being Arip-Teshub (“Teshub gave”) and Teshub-ewri (“Teshub is the lord”).

In 1944, Ignace J. Gelb has proposed that a deity possibly designated as “Dagan of the Hurrians” (ša ḪAR-ri, often interpreted ša ḫurri) in a late Old Babylonian inscription of king Šunuḫru-ammu of Ḫana from Terqa can be understood as Teshub, but this view is no longer accepted today, and most authors consider him to be Kumarbi instead. Lluís Feliu outright rejects the possibility that a Hurrian deity is meant and instead interprets it as a reference of a hypostasis of Dagan analogous to ^{d}KUR en ḫa-ar-ri, attested in texts from Emar.

A certain Ehli-Teššup was the king of Alze (Alše), a state which belonged to an anti-Assyrian coalition during the reign of Tukulti-Ninurta I. Various kings with names invoking Teshub have also ruled over various small states in the upper Tigris area during the reign of Tiglath-Pileser I. Kings of Shubria also bore theophoric names invoking him, as attested for example in texts from the reign of Esarhaddon. Ṭābatum at some point apparently was ruled by a certain Akit-Teššub, as indicated by an inscription of his descendant Adad-bēl-gabbe.

=== Ugaritic reception ===
Texts from Ugarit from the thirteenth century BCE indicate that Hurrian deities, including Teshub, were worshipped in this city. Alfonso Archi has argued that the Hurrian pantheon of Ugarit as a whole was influenced by the tradition of Aleppo. However, Piotr Taracha maintains that it represented a distinct tradition. Offering lists from Ugarit show a merging of Hurrian and local traditions, and combine figures from both pantheons, with Ugaritic deities such as El or Anat appearing in Hurrian context. One of such texts places Teshub between El and Kušuḫ. In another, offerings to him are prescribed twice, and in both cases take place between these dedicated to El and Kumarbi. In a ritual text written in a combination of Hurrian and Ugaritic which mentions both Šauška and Ashtart, he is placed between El and the former of these two goddesses in an enumeration of deities receiving offerings. Overall, Teshub's position in the Hurrian offering lists from Ugarit can be compared to Baal’s in these reflecting strictly local tradition.

Numerous theophoric names invoking Teshub are attested in the Ugaritic text corpus. As of 2016, 70 individuals bearing them have been identified. This makes him one of the five deities most common in theophoric names attested in sources from this site, and while he is not as common as El and Baal, he does appear with frequency comparable to Resheph and Shapash. Examples include Anani-Teshub (“Teshub rejoiced”), Ari-Teshub (“Teshub gave”), Kel-Teshub (“Teshub leaves unscathed”), Talmi-Teshub (“great is Teshub”), Uri-Teshub (“Teshub is here”) and the bilingual hybrid name Ili-Teshub (“my god is Teshub”). Wilfred H. van Soldt has argued that in this context “it is quite possible that with the name Teššub not the main god of the Hurrian pantheon is meant, but the principal deity of Ugarit”, with the Hurrian god only being a stand-in for Baal. However, Mary E. Buck in her analysis of Ugaritic and Amorite naming patterns concludes that in Ugarit the local weather god and Teshub coexisted. She notes that his importance separates this city from other Amorite sites.

=== Hittite reception ===
Teshub was also worshipped by the Hittites. However, while Ḫattušili I already mentions that he plundered the statue of a weather god from Haššuwa and brought it with him to Hattusa, there is no evidence that Teshub (or other Hurrian deities) was already worshipped there in the Old Hittite period. It is possible that he was first introduced to Hittite lands by Šuppiluliuma I. Piotr Taracha links his introduction to the start of the reign of a new dynasty which originated in Kizzuwatna.

In Hittite sources, Teshub was recognized as the head of the dynastic, rather than national, pantheon, and much like in the Mitanni empire and many other kingdoms, he was regarded as a royal deity. The introduction of Teshub and other Hurrian deities did not result in the Hittite deities being no longer worshipped. However, in Hattusa a temple of the Hittite weather god, referred to Taparwašu locally, was reassigned to Teshub of Aleppo. The worship of this hypostasis of him in this city had essentially Hurrian character. The cult of this form of Teshub and of his spouse Ḫepat attained a degree of importance in Hittite religion. Thirteen festivals were held jointly in honor of them, which has been interpreted as an annual cycle of monthly celebrations, with the thirteenth being added on leap years. While the associated hypostasis of Teshub was the one linked to Aleppo, there is no clear indication that the individual celebrations originated in the tradition of this city. In Hattusa, Teshub of Aleppo was worshipped as “Teshub of Aleppo of Hattusa”, though references to “Teshub of Aleppo of Kummanni” are known too and according to Piotr Taracha reflect a connection between this city and the origin of the ruling family. In the Šunaššura treaty, Teshub of Aleppo and Ḫepat appear directly after the main triad of Hittite deities (the weather god, the sun goddess and a tutelary deity, logographically ^{d}LAMMA). However, in other similar texts hypostases of Teshub could be listed among other weather gods right behind the sun goddess of Arinna. According to a prayer of Muwatalli II (CTH 381), a temple dedicated to Teshub of Aleppo and Ḫepat existed in Ḫurma, east of Kanesh. However, in this city, as well as in Uda, both Teshub and local weather gods were worshipped. (Note: The weather god worshipped in Uda was associated with Pitteryariga, while a link between the weather god from Ḫurma and weather god of Zippalanda is uncertain.)

As a dynastic deity, Teshub was recognized as the head of the local pantheon of Šapinuwa, where Tudhaliya III resided in the early years of his reign. Similarly, when Muršili II moved to Katapa in the final period of his reign, he introduced Teshub to this city, and his cult eclipsed that of local deities such as the so-called “Queen of Katapa”. During the reign of Muwatalli II in Arinna two hypostases of Teshub qualified by Hurrian epithets, eḫllibi (“of salvation”) and šuḫurribi (“of life”) were worshipped alongside the local pantheon: the sun goddess of Arinna, Mezulla, the deified mountain Ḫulla, Zintuḫi and a different weather god who represented a minor category of so-called “storm gods of the forest”. In Ankuwa, during the reign of Tudhaliya IV Teshub was worshipped during the AN.TAḪ.ŠUM festival.

Teshub of Kumme and Teshub of Arrapḫa were recognized by the Hittites too. Other hypostases of this god worshipped in the Hittite Empire included Teshub of Kizzuwatna, Teshub of Manuzzi, Teshub of Šapinuwa and Teshub of Durmitta. Furthermore, weather gods designated by the terms muwattalli (“mighty”) and piḫaššašši (“of lightning”), the personal tutelary deities of, respectively, Muršili II and Muwattalli II, should be considered forms of Teshub according to Piotr Taracha. However, Manfred Hutter argues that piḫaššašši instead referred to the Luwian weather god Tarḫunz. Gary Beckman similarly classifies him as Luwian, while Suzanne Herbordt treats him as distinct from Teshub. Taracha assumes a further Hittite hypostasis of Teshub was the weather god “of the camp” (KARAŠ), who he interprets as his aspect as the king's tutelary deity in war due to his apparent association with Zitḫariya, well attested in such a role.

Teshub is among Hurrian deities identified on the reliefs from the Yazılıkaya sanctuary, the central of which (42) depicts him standing on the napes of two mountain gods, alongside his family: Ḫepat (43), Šarruma (44), Allanzu (45) and Kunzišalli (46). The procession of deities following him broadly follows the order of his kaluti, though a specific Hurro-Hittite ritual text directly matching the reliefs has yet to be found. The deities following Teshub have been identified as Tašmišu, (Note: However, it has also been argued that the second figure is a secondary weather god linked to a city the name of which is not preserved.) Kumarbi, Ea, Šauška with Ninatta and Kulitta, Kušuḫ, Šimige, Aštabi, Nupatik, Pirengir, Ḫešui, symbol of heaven held by two bull men standing on a symbol of earth, Ugur, Pišaišapḫi, thirteen unidentified deities and twelve gods of the underworld.

As a result of Hittite influence, Teshub is among the deities mentioned in a ritual text from Emar, which despite being written in a local dialect of Akkadian is described as “Tablet of the rites of the gods of the Hatti Land” in its colophon and reflects Hittite, rather than local, beliefs. Names such as Ewri-Teshub, Kundi-Teshub (meaning uncertain), Mudri-Teshub (meaning uncertain), Talmi-Teshub or Ikūn-Teshub (“Teshub was faithful”; the first element is not Hurrian) are attested in texts from the same city as well, but most of their bearers were members of the Hittite administration stationed in Carchemish, rather than local inhabitants.

=== Luwian reception ===
Due to Hurrian influence on various Luwian communities, in southern Anatolia Teshub came to be regarded as the head of many local pantheons. (Note: However, western Luwian communities in Arzawa and Lukka were not influenced by Hurrian religion.) It is known that he could receive Luwian epithets, but it is not certain if figures referred to with the titles piḫaimi (“hurling lightning”), waraẖitaššaš (“of help”), ariyaddalli (“mountainous”) and dupattanašši (“punishing”) can be necessarily identified as hypostases of him rather than his natively Luwian counterpart Tarḫunz.

In the first millennium BCE in the kingdom of Tabal, whose local Luwian pantheon has been described as “Hurrianized,” Teshub was seemingly identified with Tarḫunz, and the latter was worshipped alongside originally Hurrian deities, including Ḫepat, Šarruma, Allanzu (“Alasuwa”), Kubaba and Ea. It is presumed that the religious developments in Tabal had strictly local character, and Manfred Hutter outright suggests referring to local beliefs as “‘Tabalean’ religion”, as opposed to Luwian or Hurrian.

While Teshub's name stopped being the default designation for weather gods in northern Syria in the first millennium BCE, he is still attested in theophoric names in Carchemish in this period. Additionally, two inscriptions from Til Barsip indicate that he continued to be worshipped at least in this location as a secondary weather god distinct from Tarḫunz. One of these texts has been commissioned by Hamiyata, king of Masuwari:

Tarhunt of Heaven, King Ea, Kumarbi, Grain-god, Tessub, Harranean Moon-god [...] and Kubaba [and other gods] loved me, the first(-born son) as a child.

== Mythology ==
=== Teshub and Kumarbi ===
The best known myths focused on Teshub belong to the so-called Kumarbi Cycle. It describes his ascent to kingship and challenges he subsequently faces due to the machinations of Kumarbi. Carlo Corti notes that despite its conventional modern title, it might be more appropriate to refer to it as the cycle of Teshub. This renaming proposal is also supported by Piotr Taracha. Erik van Dongen also argues that the old label needs to be reconsidered and acknowledges Teshub, rather than Kumarbi, as its primary character, though he considers a title more broadly referring to kingship in heaven rather than to a singular deity to be preferable.

It is not known how many myths originally formed the cycle. It is also possible that more than one cycle of myths focused on the conflict between Teshub and Kumarbi existed. The conventional reconstructed sequence cited in modern literature consists of five: Song of Emergence, Song of LAMMA, Song of Silver, Song of Ḫedammu and Song of Ullikummi. According to Alfonso Archi, the last three myths are arranged on the increasingly more threatening nature of their antagonists, though he also stresses that it cannot be assumed they form a coherent whole. It is uncertain if the Song of the Sea was also a part of the cycle, and which position it should occupy if this classification is accepted. Multiple further fragmentary texts possibly also related to these narratives have been identified, including Ea and the Beast and a fragment focused on the deity Eltara. The individual myths all portray Kumarbi's plots against Teshub as initially successful in order to create suspense, but ultimately the younger god overcomes difficulties and emerges victorious. Both of the main participants in the conflict are aided by various allies, with Teshub being backed chiefly by figures associated with the sky, for example Šauška, Šimige, Kušuḫ, Ḫepat, Takitu, Tašmišu and Aštabi, and Kumarbi with these dwelling in the underworld or the sea.

While Hittite translations of myths about Teshub could replace his name with that of Tarḫunna, according to Gary Beckman it is not certain if any of them were known to average Hittite, or even to royal courtiers. Their plots do not reflect Hittite tradition, but rather the beliefs of Hurrians inhabiting the north of Syria and Mesopotamia, as indicated by their geographic setting, with direct references made to locations such as Tigris, Mukish or Mount Hazzi. The notion of “kingship in heaven”, commonly referenced in them, was otherwise largely absent from natively Hittite theology, and can only be considered a “literary borrowing”. Most likely Hurrian myths were imported from northern Syria and adapted in Hitte to serve as a form of scribal training, and possibly as courtly entertainment. Some of the adaptations might have been prepared in Šapinuwa during the reign of Tudhaliya II or Tudhaliya III.

==== Song of Emergence (Song of Kumarbi) ====
Regardless of the number and arrangement of myths classified as a part of the cycle dealing with Teshub and Kumarbi, the same composition is agreed to be its beginning by experts. Until the 2000s, various provisional titles were used to refer to it in academic publications, for example Song of Kumarbi or Kingship in Heaven, eventually it was established that the text was originally known as the Song of Emergence. The preserved tablet was prepared by the scribe Ašḫapala, who was active during the reign of Tudhaliya I. However, the composition is older, as the colophon mentions the existence of a damaged exemplar from which it was copied, which in turn presumably constituted a Hittite adaptation of unknown Hurrian originals. Only a single possibly related fragment written in Hurrian is presently known, KUB 47.56, but due to state of preservation and still imperfect understanding of the language it does not shed additional light on the plot of the myth.

The Song of Emergence describes Teshub's birth after an introductory section dedicated to the succession of primordial kings of the gods. He is conceived when Kumarbi seizes kingship among the gods after battling the previous deity who held this position, Anu, and biting off his genitals. After being mutilated, Anu mocks Kumarbi:

Do not rejoice over your belly, for I have placed a burden in your belly. First, I have impregnated you with the mighty Storm-god. Second, I have impregnated you with the River Tigris, not to be borne. Third, I have impregnated you with the mighty Tašmišu. I have placed three frightful deities as a burden in your belly, and you will end up banging your head against the rocks of Mt. Tašša!

As noted by Gary Beckman, due to his origin Teshub effectively represents a fusion of two rival families of gods, one represented by Anu, and the other by Kumarbi and Alalu, who reigned in heaven before Anu.

While Kumarbi manages to spit out Tašmišu, impregnating Mount Kanzura with him as a result, in order to get rid of Teshub he has to travel to Nippur in Mesopotamia, where he consults Ea about his condition. Teshub actively partakes in the discussion from inside Kumarbi's body, and argues that it would be optimal for him to emerge from his head. In another passage in which he has yet to be born he apparently indicates that he will receive various positive traits from other deities. In the section of the myth preceding his birth, Teshub is referred to as A.GILIM and KA.ZAL, possibly because he has yet to receive his proper name or simply to let the scribes display their familiarity with various rare writings of theonyms. However, they are not used in such a context in any other texts. Presumably even at the time of compilation and copying of the text they were obscure. They might have originated in multilingual lexical lists.

Kumarbi's skull is eventually split to enable Teshub's birth, and afterwards it has to be repaired “like a garment” by the fate goddesses (Gulšeš in the Hittite adaptation). He is enraged by the ordeal and demands to have the child, referred to with the logogram NAM.ḪÉ, “abundance” (in the past sometimes incorrectly interpreted as a separate, female figure), handed over to him so that he can crush or devour him. However, he is tricked by unknown means into biting a piece of a stone instead, enabling his son to survive. According to Erik van Dongen, following the earlier study of Anna Maria Polvani it can be assumed the term used to refer to it, kunkunuzzi, has no specific meaning, and could refer to any hard stone, not necessarily to basalt, diorite or granite, as sometimes suggested. When the narrative resumes after an account of setting up the stone as a place where humans will make offerings (perhaps an etiology of so-called ḫuwaši stones, treated as cult objects in Syria and Anatolia) and a gap, various deities are debating who will become the next king of the gods. It is not known what, if any, conclusion they reach, but they seemingly do not assign this position to Teshub. He is displeased by the discussion. In the following passage, he boasts about own positive qualities and curses the other gods. His bull Šeri warns him about doing so. He singles out Ea in particular, but it is not certain if this is because he sees him as a uniquely dangerous potential opponent or because he views him as a neutral figure who does not need to be antagonized. Teshub also mentions that he drove away a war god (represented by the logogram ^{d}ZA.BA._{4}.BA_{4}), which might constitute an allusion to a lost episode dealing with a battle between him and Kumarbi involving a number of their respective allies. Alternatively, the unidentified war god might have been cursed due to not supporting Teshub enthusiastically enough during the debate about kingship, though this proposal remains purely hypothetical. It is possible that the confrontation between Teshub and Hurrian primeval deities also took place at this point, and lead to their confinement in the underworld described in other Hurro-Hittite texts.

In a further preserved passage someone informs Ea about Teshub's curse; in the past it has been suggested that this deity, whose name is heavily damaged, is the poorly known possibly Hattian goddess Tauri, but this is now considered implausible. He apparently responds to it with a proverb, “under the beer-pot [a fire is placed(?)], and that pot will boil over(?)”, possibly to be understood as a declaration that no god should tamper with him in such a way. Due to gaps, it is not certain how the remaining surviving passages are connected with the earlier sections of the myth, and if Teshub plays any role in them. Some of them deal with the birth of children of deified earth, but it is not certain if they are to be understood as adversaries of Teshub.

An additional fragment of the Song of Emergence pertaining to Teshub might be preserved on the tablet KUB 33.105, which contains a dialogue between him and Anu. He recounts his conflict with Kumarbi, describing how he was sent seven times to heaven, seven times to earth and seven times to mountains and rivers. He also states he owes his wisdom to Nara and his virility to Anu, but the rest of this section is broken off.

==== Song of LAMMA ====
The sumerogram LAMMA can also be read as KAL, and therefore the name of the eponymous deity the Song of LAMMA focuses on is sometimes rendered as KAL too. The first surviving section describes a fight between him and Teshub, assisted by Šauška, which the siblings seemingly lose. Their opponent takes away Teshub's chariot and whip. He is then most likely appointed as a new king of the gods by Ea, but eventually he and Kumarbi grow displeased with his incompetence and seek to depose him. The rest of the myth is poorly preserved, but after a gap of undetermined length LAMMA and Teshub fight again, with the former apparently losing this time. Most likely he is not killed, but has to transfer the regalia of kingship to Teshub. According to Alfonso Archi, LAMMA can be identified as the tutelary god of Carchemish, Karhuha, as evidenced by the use of this sumerogram to designate him in a text attributed to Suppiluliuma I. The original meaning, the name of a type of protective deity in Mesopotamia, is not considered to fit the context. On the basis of identification of LAMMA as Karhuha Archi proposes that the myth was originally composed in Carchemish during a period of Mitanni domination under the influence of other narratives today considered to be parts of the Kumarbi Cycle, and that while its fragmentary preservation makes interpretation difficult, Teshub's victory over the local god might have reflected the acceptance of supremacy of said dynasty.

==== Song of Silver ====
In the Song of Silver, most likely translated into Hittite from a Hurrian original presumably composed in western Syria, Teshub is first mentioned when the eponymous being is presented by the narrator as greater than the gods. Later Silver learns from his mother, a mortal woman, that his (step-)brother is Teshub and his father is Kumarbi, which prompts him to embark on a journey to the latter's sacred city, Urkesh. The rest of the narrative is not fully preserved, but it is presumed that he was enthroned as a temporary king of the gods. In In a passage presumably following this event, Teshub is fearful of his power, and questions if he can defeat him, prompting Tašmišu to taunt him over this display of timidity. While the surviving passages do not describe the dethroning and defeat of Silver, it is presumed the narrative nonetheless ended with these events due to parallels with other myths classified as parts of the Kumarbi Cycle.

==== Song of Ḫedammu ====
Song of Ḫedammu is focused on the struggle between Teshub and Šauška and the eponymous being, a monstrous son of Kumarbi and Šertapšuruḫi, a daughter of his ally, the personified sea. Teshub first hears about this new opponent from Šauška, who refuses to sit down, eat or drink once she arrives with the news. Teshub becomes despondent after hearing them and starts to cry. Apparently a brief confrontation follows and results in havoc among mortals, which prompts Ea to berate both sides, starting with Teshub and his allies:

(...) Ea began to say: “Why are you destroying mankind? They will not give sacrifices to the gods. They will not burn cedar and incense to you. If you destroy mankind, they will no longer worship the gods. No one will offer bread or libations to you any longer. Even Teššub, Kummiya’s heroic king, will himself work the plow.

Kumarbi is the next to be berated, and apparently takes offense in it, which according to Harry A. Hoffner might mark the point at which the two, portrayed as allies in earlier sections of the cycle, start to become estranged, which ultimately culminates in Ea advising Teshub instead in the Song of Ullikummi.

In the next passage, which is poorly preserved, Teshub and Šauška talk about Ḫedammu. The latter concocts a plan to defeat him with the help of her servants Ninatta and Kulitta, the enactment of which culminates in the aquatic being leaving his throne under the sea and coming to dry land is described in the remaining surviving fragments. While no surviving section describes the final fate of Ḫedammu, it is nonetheless assumed he was eventually defeated. It is not certain whether he was killed by Teshub or was allowed to live like LAMMA.

==== Song of Ullikummi ====
In contrast with many of the related narratives, the Song of Ullikummi is relatively well preserved. It is considered the most complete myth of Hurrian origin presently known to researchers. It has been noted that its plot features a number of elements also present in the Song of Ḫedammu. According to Alfonso Archi, it might be derived from early Hurrian tradition, though the version known to the Hittites could only arise after Hurrian settlement in western Syria.

The myth begins with a scene of Kumarbi plotting against Teshub:

Kumarbi forms in his mind a clever plan. He raises an “Evil Day” in the form of a hostile man and makes hostile plans against Teshub. Kumarbi [entertains] wise thoughts in his mind and aligns them like beads (on a string). When Kumarbi [had formed] a clever plan [in his mind], he promptly arose from his chair.

His plot revolves around the eponymous being, Ullikummi, whose name means “Destroy Kumme!”, Kumme being both the main cult center of Teshub and his abode in myths. It is meant to describe his destiny, as he was created to supplant the weather god and destroy him and his city. He is described as a son of Kumarbi and an enormous boulder and he is made out of kunkunuzzi, “hard stone”, much like the rock Kumarbi bites into in the Song of Emergence. Kumarbi presents Ullikummi to his various allies, including the deified sea, and describes what the stone creature is meant to accomplish:

Let him go up to heaven to kingship. Let him suppress the fine city of Kummiya. Let him strike Teshub. Let him chop him up fine like chaff. Let him grind him up under food [like] an ant. Let him snap off Tašmišu like a brittle red. Let him scatter all the gods from the sky like birds. Let him smash them [like] empty pottery bowls.

However, he fears Ullikummi could be easily defeated while he is still small, and therefore sends him to spend some time in hiding on the shoulder of the giant Upelluri. He keeps growing, and due to his enormous size he is eventually noticed by the “Sun god of Heaven” (Hurrian Šimige), who immediately rushes to warn Teshub about this new adversary. The weather god sets up a chair, a meal and a drink for him, but he refuses to sit down, eat or drink, prompting his host to wonder if maybe they were set up improperly in the final lines of the first tablets of the composition. Presumably the broken beginning of the second tablet contained an explanation of this misunderstanding, as in the next surviving passage Teshub reacts to the bad news and reassures the sun god that he can sit down and eat and drink wine now. He then embarks on a journey to Mount Hazzi with his siblings, Tašmišu and Šauška, and after reaching his destination he finally sees Ullikummi himself, which sends him into despair. He describes how daunting of a task fighting him would be and starts crying. In order to help Teshub, Šauška attempts to woo Ullikummi with song and dance like she did earlier with Ḫedammu. However, after she dresses up, adorns her hair with seashells and starts signing, a wave informs her that the target is deaf, blind and unfeeling, which makes him immune to any such efforts, and suggests that she should instead try to get Teshub to confront him as soon as possible, as he will only continue to grow more dangerous. In the next surviving passage, Teshub tells Tašmišu to prepare the bulls Šerišu and Tilla and a chariot, and apparently a confrontation between him and Ullikummi occurs. The weather god loses it. Other gods, including Aštabi, attempt to fight Ullikummi, but he continues to grow and eventually blocks the gates of Kumme, trapping Teshub's wife Ḫepat inside, unable to find out what happened to him. She worries that Teshub might have died in the battle, and sends her messenger Takiti to find out what happened, but the rest of the passage is missing and when the text resumes after a lacuna, Tašmišu arrives near her dwelling to reassure her that Teshub is alive, which almost makes her fall down from the roof. He then returns to Teshub's temporary dwelling, and suggests to him that they need to meet with Ea in “Apzuwa”. After arriving in Ea's house both of them bow down, though he is apparently angered by Teshub's presence. In a series of fragmentary passages, Ea then meets with various other deities, including Enlil, Upelluri and the primeval deities, and tells them about Ullikummi. With the help of the primeval deities, he recovers a copper tool which was used to separate heaven from earth, and uses it to cut Ullikummi from Upelluri after realizing this connection is the source of the former's power. The separation negates the invulnerability he exhibited in earlier sections of the myth. Ea then tells Tašmišu that Ullikummi needs to be confronted for a second time. He reacts with enthusiasm, and relays this information to Teshub before going with him to a place where the other gods hold an assembly. The rest of the surviving passages all describe the second encounter between Teshub and Ullikummi. The next passage has the form of a monologue:

(...) “What can I say to you, Teshub? Keep attacking. Be of his mind. for Ea, King of Wisdom, is on your side.”

“What can I say to you, Teshub? I held [counsel?] and before my mind I lined up wisdom like (a string of) beads as follows: ‘I will go up to heaven to kingship. I will take to myself Kummiya, [the gods’] holy temples, and the kuntarra-shrines. (Note: According to Volkert Haas, this word is instead a Hurrian term referring to Teshub’s palace in heaven.) I will scatter the gods down from the sky like meal.’”

Ullikummi spoke again to Teshub: “Behave like a man again [...]. Ea, King of Wisdom, stands on your side.” (...)

It is not certain what happened next. The text breaks off after Ullikummi's comments, but the existence of another now lost tablet describing the battle between him and Teshub has been proposed. Presumably the weather god ultimately emerges as the victor, but the ultimate fate of Ullikummi remains unknown.

==== Other related texts ====
Due to the numerous references to an alliance between Kumarbi and the personified sea in the Song of Ḫedammu and the Song of Ullikummi, it has been proposed that the Song of the Sea was another myth belonging to the same cycle. It was performed during a festival dedicated to Mount Hazzi. While due to imperfect understanding of Hurrian the plot is not fully known, most likely it focuses on a conflict between the personified sea and Teshub. Ian Rutherford suggests that it can be placed before Song of Ḫedammu, perhaps as the first half of the same narrative, with the sea's presumed defeat at the hands of Teshub motivating him to join forces with Kumarbi. As an alternative, he proposes placing it between the Song of Emergence and Song of LAMMA. Daniel Schwemer instead argues that the conflict between Teshub and the sea might have constituted a finale of the cycle of myths focused on him, with the victory finally confirming his status as the king of the gods once and for all.

A text related to the Song of the Sea and similarly focused on the conflict between this being and Teshub might be KBo 26.105, argued to represent a narrative comparable to Egyptian Astarte and the Sea due to the presence of a passage in which Kumarbi urges other gods to pay tribute to the sea. It might be a Hittite adaptation of the same myth. A reference to conflict between Teshub and the sea and the defeat of the latter also occurs in the myth of Pišaiša (KUB 33.108), which additionally mentions that at some point rebellious mountain gods seemingly stole the weapon the weather god used during it. The conflict between Teshub and the mountains is not otherwise well attested, though as the names of Namni and Ḫazzi occur in a broken context in the Pišaiša myth, it is possible that its outcome was the subjugation of these two deities.

It has been proposed that the myth Ea and the Beast was another composition belonging to the Kumarbi Cycle. It is possible that it can be considered an alternative version of the same narrative as Song of Emergence, or that it at least repeats information also known from this composition. Yet another interpretation is that it fulfilled a different function altogether, such as that of a hymn in praise of Teshub. Its plot focuses on prophecies about a god who will be born soon which an unidentified animal, suppalanza, reveals to Ea. It is presumed that he can be identified as Teshub, and that the prophecies deal with his conflict with Kumarbi and ascent to kingship. A reference is made to sending opponents to the underworld, a motif also attested elsewhere in Hurrian tradition. For example, driving the primeval deities into the underworld is also mentioned in a passage from a purification ritual (KBo 10.45 + ABoT 2.30), which also states that the weather god was responsible for establishing the tradition according to which birds, rather than cattle or sheep, were seen as an appropriate offering for them. The suppalanza also mentions that the god presumed to be Teshub will “draw away” a serpent, ^{MUŠ}illuyanka, but there is no indication that this is a reference to an extant Hittite myth whose antagonist is also named Illuyanka. Said narrative (CTH 321) was connected with the traditions of the city of Nerik, derived from Hattian religion. Ian Rutherford notes that presuming the Hittite Illuyanka is meant would require assuming that a degree of cross contamination with strictly Hittite tradition occurred, and additionally points out the relevant myth does not present him as a figure connected to the rise of any weather god to power. He also considers it unlikely that the passage is a reference to the Song of Ḫedammu.

The text KBo 22.87 has been argued to be a further myth belonging to the Kumarbi Cycle. It describes a period of time during which Eltara, one of the primeval deities, reigned as the king of the gods. Two of the surviving lines mention Teshub: in one, he apparently attains kingship like Eltara did, while in another a number of servants submit to him. Anna Maria Polvani has suggested that the myth of Eltara might have dealt with the final enthronement of Teshub as the king of the gods.

==== Comparative scholarship ====
Parallels between the myths about Teshub's struggle for kingship and between motifs from Greek mythology have been pointed out, with his ascent to the position of the head of the pantheon compared to the history of Zeus presented in Hesiod’s Theogony. According to Gary Beckman these similarities are not a sign that the conflict over kingship in heaven was a narrative of Indo-European origin, but rather instead an indication that it was what he deems a “theological ‘areal feature’” known across Mesopotamia, Anatolia and the Mediterranean. It is also considered likely that the myth of Athena’s birth from the split skull of Zeus was patterned on Teshub's birth. According to Amir Gilan, derivatives of certain elements of the myths about Teshub might have reached Greece through the kingdom of Walistin, which retained aspects of earlier theology of Aleppo in the first millennium BCE, as indicated for example by inscriptions from Arsuz.

=== Song of Release ===
Teshub is one of the main characters in the Song of Release, alternatively known as Epic of Freeing. As elsewhere in Hurrian mythology, he is portrayed as the king of the gods and as the lord of Kumme. The Song of Release is known from multiple fragments of bilingual editions coupling the Hurrian original with a Hittite translation, prepared by scribes from Hattusa around 1400 BCE. However, it is presumed that it was originally composed earlier, possibly in the sixteenth century BCE. The translation was most likely prepared to facilitate the learning of Hurrian language. The sequence of events in the myth remains uncertain, and the interpretation of its plot is a matter of scholarly debate. One of the only fixed points is the proem. It introduces the deities playing the main roles in the plot:

I will sing of Teššub, the great lord of Kummi, I will exalt the young lady Allani, the bolt of the Underworld. And with them I will tell of the young lady Išḫara, skillful in speaking, a goddess renowned for wisdom.

The same section also introduces a man named Pizigarra, said to come from Nineveh, but his role in the story remains poorly understood and he is not attested in any other sources.

The central theme of the Song of Release is the freeing of the inhabitants of the city of Igingalliš, who are kept as slaves in Ebla. According to Gernot Wilhelm, they are identified as enslaved prisoners of war, as opposed to people subjected to debt slavery, though in older scholarship the text was sometimes interpreted under the assumption that the latter possibility is correct. Similar observations have been made by Eva von Dassow, who notes that the entire population of the city is deprived of freedom, which reflects subjugation in war. The city of Igingalliš is also attested in historical records, and most likely was either a tributary or a dependent territory of Ebla at some point.

In one of the fragments, Teshub asks the king of Ebla, Megi, to release the enslaved inhabitants of Igingalliš. He singles out a certain Purra, who has served under multiple rulers already:

Release the sons of Igingalliš
in well-being,
release the captive, Purra,
who has served nine kings.

For Igingalliš three kings
he has served,
for Ebla six kings
he has served,
and now, for the tenth,
Megi, before you he stands.

He offers to bless the city if his wish is granted, and to destroy it in the case of denial:

If you (pl.) decree release,
For Ebla the fate is (this):
you (pl.) decree release,
to god-like (power) i shall exalt
your weaponry.

Your weaponry will beat the opponent,
gloriously shall your field(s) thrive.

If you (pl.) do not decree release,
the fate for Ebla is (this):
on the seventh day
I shall come upon you.

Like other human characters in this myth, Purra and Megi are not historical figures, and the name of the latter is derived from a title used by historical Eblaite rulers.

Megi subsequently presents Teshub's message to the senate of the city, where a certain Zazalla, its speaker, argues against fulfilling the request. He sarcastically asks the king if Teshub himself lost his freedom, and states that if it was him who was in trouble, he and the senate would be ready to help him, whether it was caused by debt, sickness or any other factors, but there is no reason to do the same for people of Ignigalliš. Megi subsequently meets with Teshub again. He explains the situation to him while weeping, and purifies himself before the text breaks off. Due to the state of preservation of the fragments it remains unknown if Ebla was destroyed by Teshub afterwards. According to Eva von Dassow, despite lack of direct references it is plausible to assume that he fulfilled his threat. It is possible that the text served as an aetiology. However, due to temporal differences it is not likely that it reflects pre-Sargonic history of the city, and the described events might instead correlate with the destruction of Middle Bronze Age Ebla, which occurred around 1600 BCE.

Mary R. Bachvarova argues that at least some of the enslaved people of were servants of Teshub, and that Zazalla's speech is simply a description of the god's suffering in absence of proper services dedicated to him. She also assumes that Purra, unlike his compatriots, was instead responsible for the funerary cult of deceased rulers. Bachvarova's interpretation has been criticized by von Dassow, who asserts that she misinterprets Zazalla's speech to treat it as a description of Teshub's state caused by the neglect of religious duties pertaining to him, and that she incorrectly treats reverence towards the deceased as unique to Ebla and conducted by a dedicated staff. She instead argues Teshub intervened on behalf of the people of Igingalliš simply because gods were believed to enforce justice, and the narrative evidently portrays their enslavement as unjust.

A poorly preserved passage apparently has the form of a dialogue between Teshub and Ishara. According to Alfonso Archi, her aim is to protect the city of Ebla, which reflects her long standing association with it. Outside of the initial invocation, this is the only surviving passage in which she appears.

Another section of the text deals with Teshub visiting Allani in the underworld. Alongside Tašmišu (Šuwaliyat in the Hittite version) and the primeval deities, elsewhere consistently portrayed as his opponents he takes part in a banquet organized with her, during which she serves her guests herself. Both the meaning of this episode and the nature of its connection with the sections of the text focused on Ebla and slavery are not certain, and multiple interpretations have been proposed. Eva von Dassow assumes that it follows a declaration that Ebla is to be destroyed, and suggests Teshub might be meeting with Allani because her domain would have to accommodate many new inhabitants in the case of such an event. Gernot Wilhelm suggests that it takes place after the destruction of Ebla, and that Teshub descends to the underworld to deal with his anger, which would reflect a motif well attested in literature of the region. Volkert Haas assumed that Teshub is imprisoned in the underworld. According to his interpretation, the weather god as a result of eating during the banquet was confined in the realm of the dead. However, as noted by Wilhelm, no actual reference to either the imprisonment or release of Teshub can be identified in the text. In her similarly critical evaluation of Haas’ proposal, von Dassow calls his interpretation of the text “incoherent” and highlights that to justify it, he attempted inserting hypothetical elements not present in the actual narrative into it, such as the motif of food from the underworld, consuming which results in imprisonment there. Wilhelm instead suggests that the banquet mirrors the rituals meant to enable deceased rulers to enter the underworld, with the deities inhabiting it welcoming him with similarly to how ancestors were believed to do in the case of mortals. Harry A. Hoffner proposes that it reflects a temporary reconciliation between heavenly and underworld gods.

As the colophon of the surviving copy of the section describing Teshub's visit in the underworld, KBo 32.13, designates it as a part of the Song of Release, but states that it is “not finished”, it is assumed at least one more tablet must have followed. However, the rest of the story is not known.

=== Tales about human heroes ===
A reference to Teshub occurs in the tale of Appu. According to Gary Beckman, this composition should be classified as belonging to a genre distinct from myths. He states that in the context of Hurro-Hittite literature the term “tale” is used to refer to narratives focused on human, rather than divine, protagonists, and which lack cosmological implications, in contrast with myths. The passage which mentions Teshub enumerates the names and residences of various deities, in his case Kumme; also mentioned are a sun god (Sippar), a moon god (Kuzina), Šauška (Nineveh), Nanaya (Kiššina) and Marduk (Babylon). Similar enumerations of deities alongside their cult centers are well attested in various genres of texts from ancient Mesopotamia and Anatolia.

A fragment of a Hurrian version of the Epic of Gilgamesh also mentions Teshub. Beckman notes that while full translation and interpretation of this text is presently not possible, Teshub is seemingly “ubiquitous” in it, which can be contrasted with both the Akkadian original and the Hittite adaptation, where the respective weather deities play no significant role.
