= Ḫešui =

Hurrian war god

- Hurrian war god

Equivalents
- Mesopotamian: Zababa

Ḫešui, also known as Ḫišue, was a Hurrian war god. He was also incorporated into the Hittite pantheon. He is sparsely attested in known sources, and his origin and the meaning of his name remain unknown.

== Origin ==
The etymology of Ḫešui's name is unknown. Alfonso Archi argues that while it can be said with certainty that deities like Teššub and Šimige were natively Hurrian, and that others, such as Aštabi or Ḫepat were incorporated into Hurrian religion from preexisting Syrian pantheons (for example from among the deities worshiped in Eblaite religion), the precise origin of Ḫešui cannot be presently established. Michael C. Astour instead proposed that the alternate form ^{d}Ḫi-šu-u-e indicates that his name was derived from the Hurrian root ḫiš-, whose meaning remains unknown. It is also attested in a personal name from Alalakh, Ḫi-iš-ša, and possibly in another name, Ḫi-ša-RI, possibly to be read as Ḫi-ša-tal, mentioned in a Mesopotamian document from the Ur III period.

== Position in the pantheon ==
Ḫešui was a war god. Annelies Kammenhauber proposed that he originally held the position of a major god in the early history of the Hurrian pantheon, in the period before the incorporation of Ḫepat into it. However, he only sporadically appears in known offering lists (kaluti), and is entirely absent from those from Ugarit.

He belonged to the circle of deities associated with Teššub, and typically appears in kaluti dedicated to him. In one of them, he follows Aštabi and Nupatik and precedes the mountain god dyad Ḫatni-Pišaišapḫi. In another, he appears between Pinikir and Iršappa, the Hurrian form of Resheph, regarded as a merchant deity in this context. Ḫešui might also be among the gods depicted on the reliefs in the Yazılıkaya sanctuary, which largely follow the order of kaluti. Piotr Taracha identifies figure number 30, which follows Pinikir and precedes two bull-men accompanied by symbols of earth and heaven in the procession of male deities, as a depiction of him, though without certainty. It has been pointed out that it resembles figure number 33, commonly identified as Aštabi. Both of the carry sickle-shaped swords on their shoulders.

Ḫešui was also incorporated into the Hittite pantheon, though it has been argued that his relevance in it was minimal. He was worshiped in Hattusa, where he most likely arrived from Kizzuwatna.

== Associations with other deities ==
Ḫešui's name could be written logographically as ^{d}ZA.BA_{4}.BA_{4}. The equivalence between him and this Mesopotamian war god is also attested in the Hurro-Akkadian god list from Emar, which lead Volkert Haas to propose this association had its roots in northern Syria. It has been proposed that another Hurrian god, Nupatik, could also correspond to Zababa, but according to Gernot Wilhelm among the Hurrian gods this connection was exclusive to Ḫešui. The logogram ^{d}ZA.BA_{4}.BA_{4} could also be employed to write his name in Hittite texts, though in this case its use was not exclusive to Ḫešui and in some cases it is difficult to tell which god is meant in texts using this writing.

A single text attests that Ḫešui had his own sukkal (attendant deity), Ḫupuštukar. His name is derived from the Hurrian verb ḫub-, "to break." In the same source he is listed alongside other sukkals: Izzummi (Ea's), Undurumma (Šauška's), Tenu (Teššub's), Lipparuma (Šimige's) and Mukišanu (Kumarbi's).
