= Tašmišu =

Hurrian god

- Attendant of Teshub

Genealogy
- Siblings: Teshub, Šauška
- Spouse: Nabarbi

Equivalents
- Hittite: Šuwaliyat

Tašmišu (also romanized without diacritics as Tashmishu) was a Hurrian god. He was regarded as a brother of Teshub, and it is assumed he had a warlike character.

== Character ==
Volkert Haas proposed that Tašmišu's name was derived from the Hurrian word tašmi, which he translates as "strong". The element-šu is a suffix attested in other names as well, such as the name of one Teshub's bulls, Šerišu, and various ordinary Hurrian personal names, such as Anniwašu and Ekammešu.

Tašmišu was one of the multiple warrior gods in the Hurrian pantheon. Other such deities were Ugur, Aštabi, Nergal and Ḫešui.

In myths, his position appears to be that of a subordinate of his brother Teshub; in a passage from the Song of Ullikummi he addresses him as his "lord". He served as his sukkal (attendant deity), though as noted by Daniel Schwemer in ritual texts this role could also be attributed to the god Tenu. He proposes that the latter was adopted from the religious tradition of ancient Aleppo. (Note: A month named after Tenu is attested in the local calendar. However, Alfonso Archi ascribes Hurrian origin to Tenu.)

== Associations with other deities ==
Tašmišu was regarded as the "pure brother" of Teshub. Their sister was the goddess Šauška. Their parents were Anu and Kumarbi. Tašmišu's wife was the goddess Nabarbi.

Hittites identified Tašmišu with their god Šuwaliyat, who had old Anatolian (Hattian) origin. However, Tašmišu never acquired his counterpart's association with vegetation. Both of them could be associated with Mesopotamian Ninurta. As a result, instances where Tašmišu's name is written logographically as ^{d}NIN.URTA are known. Another attested logographic writing is ^{d}URAŠ. Furthermore, a version of the Weidner god list from Emar identifies him with Papsukkal.

== Worship ==
In Hurrian offering lists (kaluti), Tašmišu usually follows Teshub. Worship of him is best attested from the Hurrian kingdom of Kizzuwatna, where he appears in various festivals related to Teshub of Šapinuwa. He is also attested among the gods worshiped in Lawazantiya.

In Emar, Tašmišu and Tenu were worshiped as members of the entourage of Teshub.

== Mythology ==
The first myth of the so-called "Kumarbi cycle" describes the birth of Tašmišu. Like his brother, he was born after Kumarbi bit off the genitals of Anu.

In the Song of Ullikummi, Tašmišu joins his siblings Teshub and Šauška when they go to see eponymous stone giant after being warned by the sun god Šimige. Later he reveals Teshub's fate after the initial confrontation with the monster to his wife Hebat. He also suggests to his brother that to find a way to defeat the new adversary they need to meet with the god Ea in his dwelling, Abzu, in the Hurrian myth assumed to be a city rather than a body of water. After Ea agrees to listen to them, Tašmišu shows his gratitude.
