= Namni and Ḫazzi =

Pair of Hurrian gods

- Mountain gods
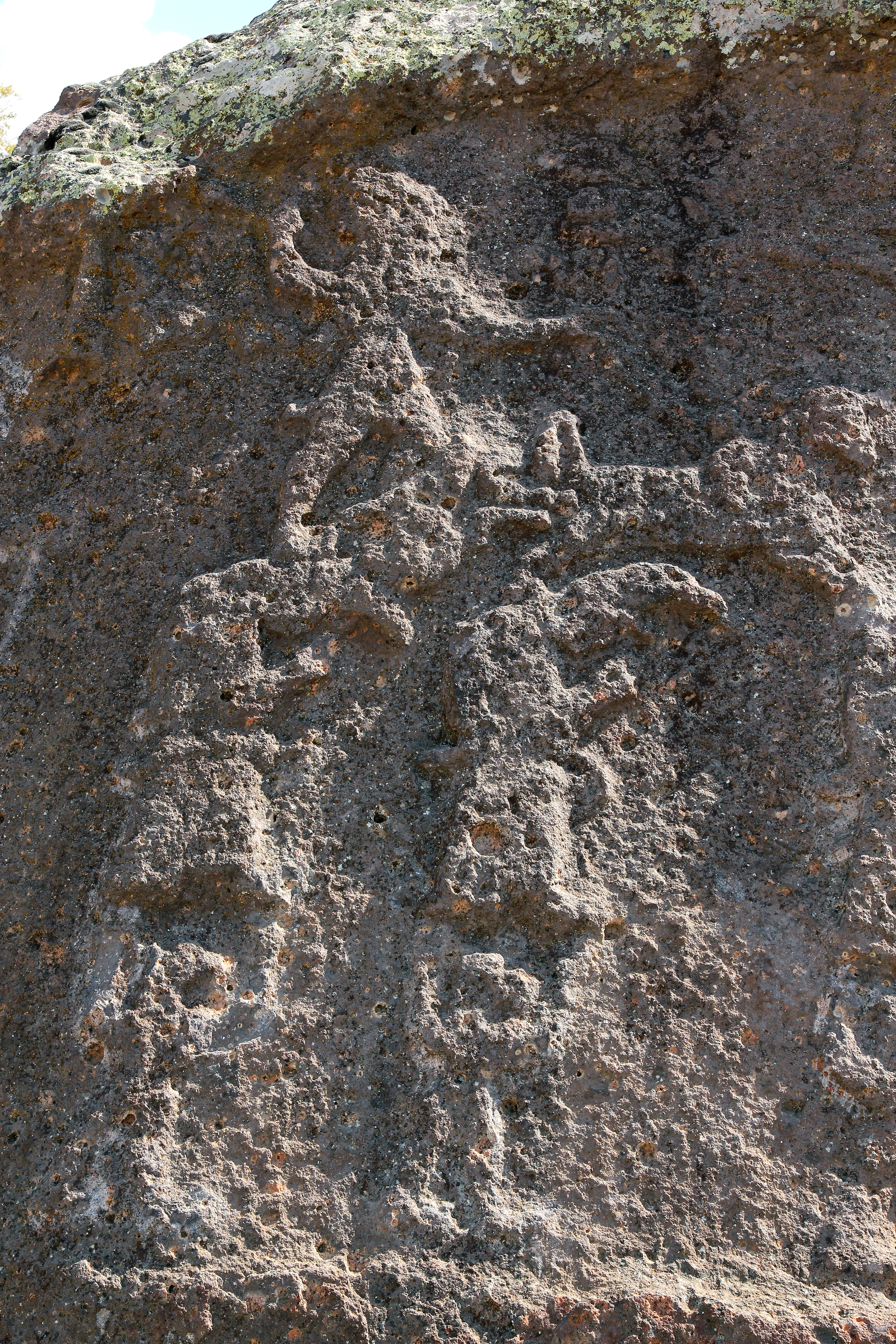
- A possible depiction of Namni and Ḫazzi on the İmamkullu relief.
- Affiliation: court of Teššub
- Major cult center: possibly Aleppo

Namni and Ḫazzi were two mountain gods who belonged to the Hurrian pantheon. They are usually mentioned together in known texts. Ḫazzi corresponds to Jebel al-Aqra, while the identification of the mountain Namni represented is disputed. Both of them belonged to the court of the Hurrian weather god, Teššub, and it is possible they were worshiped alongside him in Aleppo. They are also attested in a variety of Hurrian and Hittite religious texts. They do not play an active role in known myths of Hurrian origin, though allusions to a conflict involving them have been identified in texts dealing with other deities.

== Names and character ==
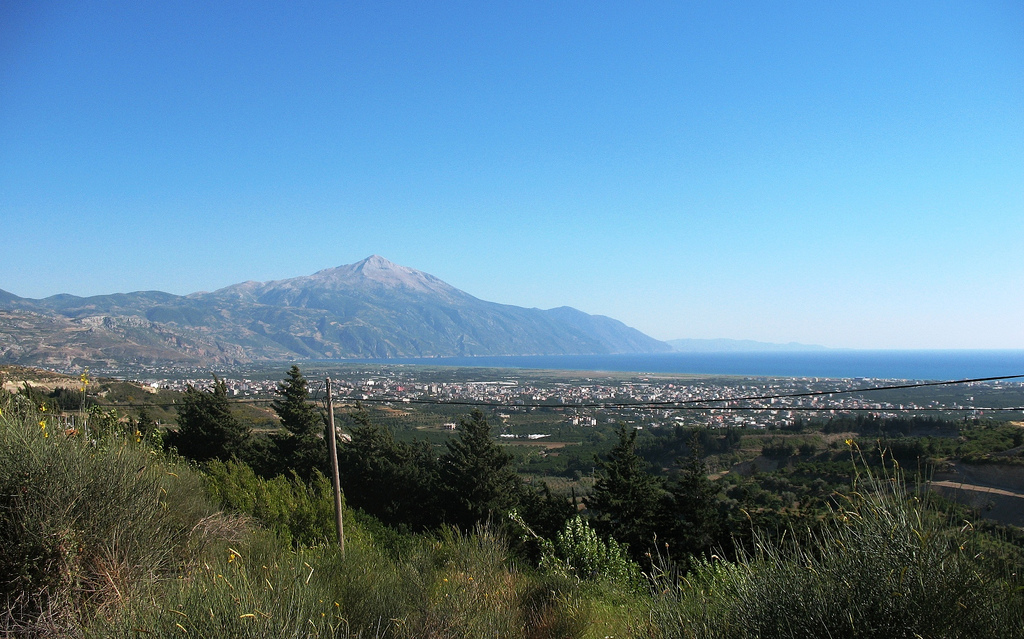
Jebel al-Aqra, the mountain represented by Ḫazzi in Hurrian mythology.

Both Namni and Ḫazzi were deified mountains, and their names could be written with the determinatives dingir or ḪUR.SAG. They functioned as a dyad and commonly appear together in known sources. In texts from the Bogazköy Archive, they are almost always mentioned as a pair. Ḫazzi was the divine representation of Jebel al-Aqra (historically known as Saphon and Cassius as well). Namni might have represented the Anti-Cassius, though the name has also been interpreted as one of the peaks of Jebel al-Aqra itself. The breve under the first consonant of the former name is sometimes omitted in modern transcriptions, leading to the use of the spelling Hazzi. Namni could also be referred to as Nanni. However, in an offering list from Mari the theonym Nanni might be a variant of Nanaya instead, though identification with the mountain god is supported by Jean-Marie Durand.

In western Hurrian tradition Namni and Ḫazzi were associated with the weather god Teššub. Daniel Schwemer has informally described them as his "sidekicks". Seals and reliefs showing an armed weather god straddling two mountains, multiple examples of which are known from Syria and Anatolia, are usually presumed to depict Namni and Ḫazzi.

== Worship ==
In ritual texts, Namni and Ḫazzi appear as members of the circle of deities associated with Teššub and his wife Ḫepat. In offering lists, they typically follow Šeri and Ḫurri, two bulls also counted among the members of the weather god’s entourage. They might have been worshiped alongside Teššub in Aleppo, though no direct evidence has been identified so far. It has been argued that an association between these two deities and the form of the weather god worshiped in Aleppo is supported by a Hurrian prayer to the latter which uses the phrase “you are with Namni, you are with Ḫazzi” (Namni=ram=ma, Ḫazzi=ram=ma) and by an Old Babylonian document from Tigunānum in northern Mesopotamia which states that the god of Aleppo, here identified as Adad, “will support the king like Nanni and Ḫazzi” (kīma šadî Nanni Ḫazzi). In the ritual KUB 27.38, Namni and Ḫazzi are mentioned after a section dedicated to deified kings (šarrēna). They also appear in a birth ritual, KBo 27.117. During the ḫišuwa festival, they received offerings referred to as keldi and ambašši in the temple of the weather god Manuzzi. The text CTH 785 has been identified as a festival focused on the mountain Ḫazzi. According to Alfonso Archi it originated in Mukiš, and was later transferred to Kizzuwatna from this area.

Namni and Ḫazzi were also incorporated into the pantheon of the Hittite Empire alongside Teššub and other members of his circle. They appear in kaluti (offering lists) dedicated to this group of deities, venerated together in Šapinuwa. In Emar they are attested in the so-called “Anatolian ritual” alongside Mušitu. According to Daniel E. Fleming, the deities attested in it should be considered separate from the local pantheon, and were only celebrated due to their role in the religion of the Hittite Empire, which controlled the city at the time.

Individuals bearing theophoric names invoking Ḫazzi have been identified in texts from Alalakh (Arip-Ḫazzi) and Ugarit (Ewri-Ḫazzi).

== Mythology ==
Namni and Ḫazzi understood as deities play no role in any of the myths considered to be a part of the so-called Kumarbi Cycle. However, the mountain Ḫazzi is the residence of Teššub in the Song of Ḫedammu and in the Song of Ullikummi he observes the eponymous monster from its peak.

In the myth of Mount Pišaiša, Namni and Ḫazzi appear in the final section of the preserved text. It is not presently possible to evaluate if they are portrayed as enemies of the weather god in this case, or if they are only mentioned as members of his entourage. Alfonso Archi has proposed that while they are well attested in the latter role, the myth might describe their subjugation. Based on their presence it has been proposed that this composition originated in inland Syria. The İmamkullu relief might be a depiction of the deities appearing in this myth, including Namni and Ḫazzi. Allusions to the conflict between Teššub and the mountain gods have also been identified in a myth dealing with the deity Eltara, presumably related to the Ugaritic god El.

== In Ugaritic texts ==
While Ugaritic scribes were apparently aware of the pairing of Namni and Ḫazzi, it is only referenced once in Ugaritic literature, specifically in a passage from the Epic of Kirta in which the children of the eponymous king lament his fate, which might indicate the tradition of associating the mountains with each other originated further inland, rather than on the Mediterranean coast, where only the veneration of Saphon (Ḫazzi) is well attested. Texts from Ugarit only use the form Ḫazzi if they are written in Akkadian, rather than in Ugaritic.
