= Hittite nursery and midwifery goddesses =

Hittite and Hurrian nursery and midwifery goddesses only exist in collective.

The Tarawa are the collective of Hittite midwifery goddesses. They helped to create the first king of gods.

The Hutellurra are the Hurrian collective of midwifery goddesses, mentioned in the "Song of Ullikummi". The Irsirra are the Hurrian collective of nursery goddesses. In the Ullikummi song they put little Ullikummi secretly on the shoulder of Ubelluri, the giant who carries the world.

== Literature ==
- Volkert Haas: Die hethitische Literatur, Walter de Gruyter GmbH & Co. KG, Berlin 2006, pages 144, 172, 162, 165, ISBN 978-3-11-018877-6
