= Tenu (god) =

Hurrian god

- Attendant of Teshub
- Major cult center: Aleppo
- Ethnic group: Hurrians, Hittites

Tenu (also romanized as Tēnu) was a Hurrian god regarded as a divine attendant (sukkal) of Teshub. He might have originated in a local tradition typical for Aleppo. He appears in a number of Hurrian offering lists (kaluti), as well as Hittite and Emariote texts.

== Name and character ==
Tenu's name was spelled as ^{d}te-nu or ^{d}te-e-nu in cuneiform. It is also known that he is referenced in a single Hieroglyphic Luwian inscription, though only the first sign of his name is preserved in this context, ti.

Tenu was regarded as the divine vizier of Teshub. He was associated with the hypostasis of this god linked with Aleppo. The weather god of this city was originally Adad, but in the second millennium BCE he came to be identified as Teshub instead due to growing Hurrian influence across northern Syria. The relation between Tenu and Teshub is directly described in the text KUB 34, 102+: ^{d}te-e-nu ^{d}te-eš-šu-up-pí ^{lú}SUKKAL. Tenu appears in this role in rituals, but in the literary texts, the same position was ascribed to Tašmišu, which according to Daniel Schwemer might indicate that the former originated in a local Aleppine tradition. However, Volkert Haas and Gary Beckman attribute Hurrian origin to him.

While in older publications references to Tenu as a "divine priest" can sometimes be found, they are the result of a misreading, with ^{lú}SUKKAL mistaken for ^{lú}SANGA.

== Worship ==
In Hurrian offering lists (kaluti) dedicated to Teshub and his circle, Tenu typically appears between Iršappa (Resheph) and the paired earth and heaven and other deified natural features. In one case, Tenu is followed by Teshub's bulls, Seri and Hurri. In yet another source, he is placed between deified objects dedicated to Teshub (našarta) and the goddess Pitḫanu ("Ḫanaean daughter"), possibly a deified epithet of Bēlet-ekallim. While Tenu occupies one of the last places in the standard enumeration of deities from the circle of Teshub, he nonetheless received as many offerings as Tašmišu, even though the latter opens the section enumerating the weather god's courtiers.

A festival held in honor of Tenu is mentioned in the Hittite instruction CTH 698, which contains information about thirteen celebrations connected to Teshub of Aleppo and his circle. However, the text provides no information about it other than a confirmation of its existence, and other sources do not shed additional light on it. Volkert Haas argued that it was celebrated in Aleppo.

It has been suggested that Tenu is depicted alongside Tiyabenti in chamber A of the Yazılıkaya sanctuary, located near Hattusa but dedicated to Hurrian deities.

Tenu is also attested in sources from Emar. He is mentioned in two texts which reflect the worship of deities from the Hittite and Hurrian pantheons in this city. There is no evidence that he had a temple in Emar, though a reference to a baetyl dedicated to him has been identified. He is absent from the theophoric names of local inhabitants.
