= Earth and Heaven (Hurrian religion) =

Hurrian and Mesopotamian cosmogonic figures

Earth and Heaven (Eše Hawurni) were worshiped by various Hurrian communities in the Ancient Near East. While considered to be a part of the Hurrian pantheon, they were not envisioned as personified deities. They were also incorporated into the Mesopotamian pantheon, possibly during the period of Mitanni influence over part of Mesopotamia, and under the names Hahharnum and Hayyashum appear in a variety of texts, including the myth Theogony of Dunnu.

== Earth and Heaven in Hurrian religion ==
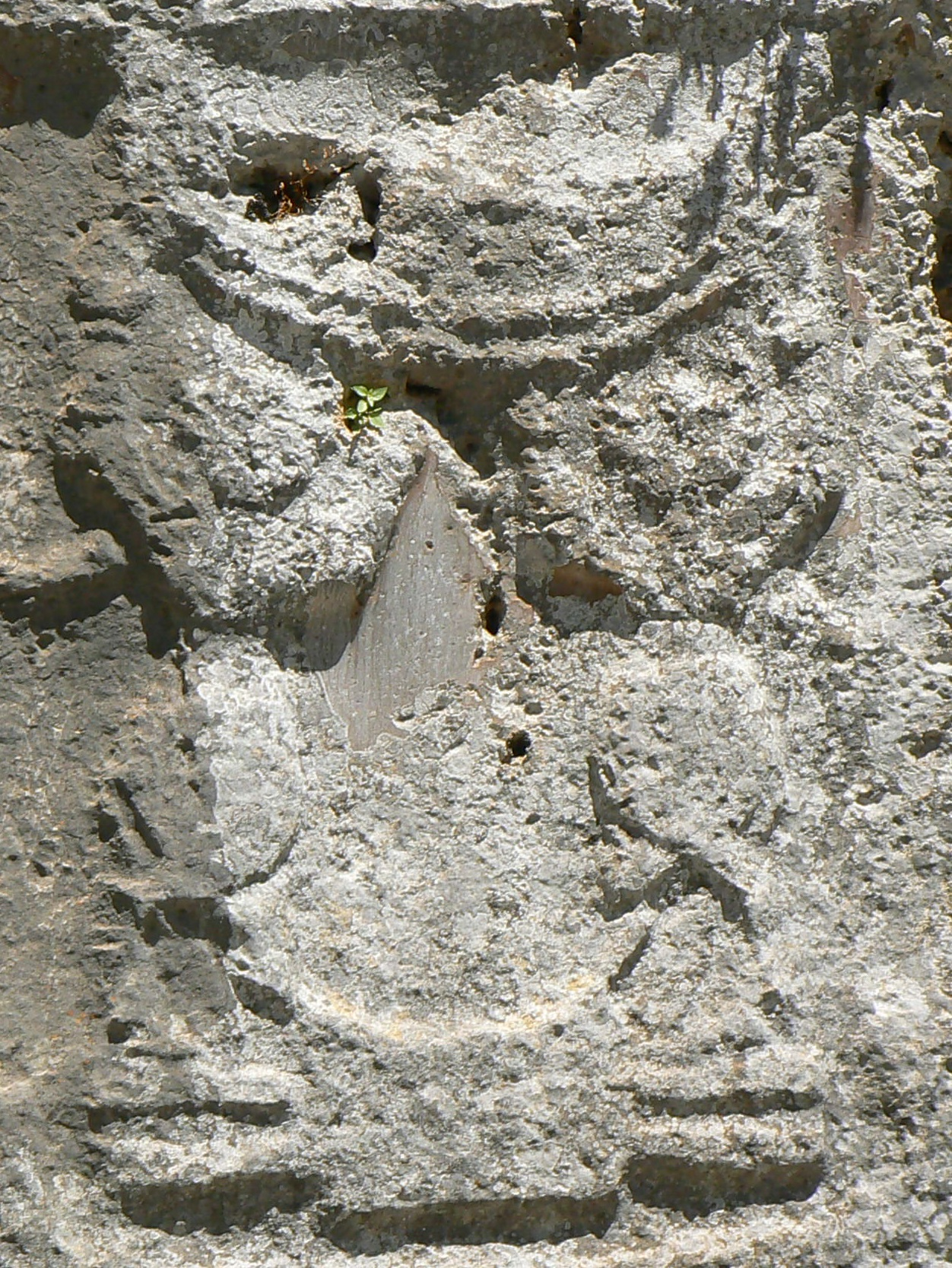
A possible depiction of two bull-men holding a symbol of Heaven and standing on a symbol of Earth.

The Hurrian term referring to the concept of a divine Earth and Heaven was eše hawurni. The deified Earth appears alongside the deified Heaven as a pair. According to Piotr Taracha, the Earth-Heaven pair should be considered "pan-Hurrian," similar to Teshub, Šauška, Kumarbi, Šimige and Kušuḫ, and as such can be found in religious texts from all areas inhabited by Hurrians, from Kizzuwatna in modern Turkey to the Zagros Mountains. However, they were not regarded as personified deities. In offering lists, they typically appear at the very end, alongside mountains, rivers, springs, the sea (Kiaše), winds and clouds. They are also present in incantations. It has been argued that figures number 28 and 29 from the Yazılıkaya reliefs, a pair of bull-men, are holding a symbol of Heaven and standing on a symbol of Earth.

The name is derived from the Hurrian word eše, "earth."

The Hurrian myth Song of Ullikummi mentions that the separation of heaven and earth occurred in the distant past, at the beginning of time. The tool used to accomplish this is most likely employed again to defeat the eponymous stone monster. According to the same myth, heaven and earth rest on the shoulders of the giant Upelluri.

A double deity from Ugaritic offering list, Arsu-wa-Shamuma (Ugaritic: "Earth and Heaven") reflects the Hurrian tradition about Earth and Heaven.

As part of a broader phenomenon of assigning new names to Hurrian figures incorporated into Hittite religion, the Hurrian Earth and Heaven occur in Hititte texts under the Hattic names Yaḫšul-Ištarazzil ("Heaven and Earth").

== Mesopotamian reception ==
The Hurrian Earth and Heaven were also incorporated into the Mesopotamian pantheon. Their names are written as ^{d}ḫa-mur-nim and ^{d}ḫa-a-a-šum in the Marduk Prophecy. They are transcribed as either Hahharnum and Hayyashum, Hamurnu and Hayašu or Ḫamurni and Ḫayašu. The Marduk Prophecy is a literary account of history prior to the reign of Nebuchadnezzar I, narrated by the eponymous god. The discussed pair occurs in the very first line, where they precede the well known gods Anu, Enlil and Ea in an enumeration of deities.

Hamurnu and possibly Hayašu also appear in a text known as the Theogony of Dunnu or the Plough Myth. Both of them are assumed to be male, and Hamurnu is apparently presented as the father of Hayašu, with Belet-Seri possibly being the mother. Wilfred G. Lambert proposes that the successor of Hamurnu could have also been his servant rather than descendant. Based on the presence of the two figures of Hurrian origin, Frans Wiggermann proposes in a recent publication that while the myth is known only from a single tabled, dated to the period between 635 and 330 BCE, it might have originally been composed between 1500 and 1350 BCE, when the Hurrian kingdom of Mitanni was culturally influential.

Both Hamurnu and Hayašum are also present in a fragment of an otherwise unknown Middle Assyrian god list (VAT 10608) from the collection of the Vorderasiatisches Museum Berlin, where they are explained as Anu and Enlil, respectively. The same tablet mentions other foreign deities, including Simut (the Elamite counterpart of Nergal), Tilla (a Hurrian god from Nuzi, here seemingly equated with Adad), Ḫilibe (a god of unknown origin) and Zanaru (an uncommon name of Ishtar derived from the Elamite word zana, "lady"), and the primordial Mesopotamian god Lugaldukuga. Hamurnu alone appears in a copy of the god list Anšar = Anum, where he is also explained as a name of Anu. However, Anu was incorporated into Hurrian tradition under his own name.

The correspondence between the Hurrian words eše and hawurni and Mesopotamian deities ^{d}ḫa-mur-nim and ^{d}ḫa-a-a-šum has been established by Wilfred G. Lambert. Prior to the discovery that their names have Hurrian origin, they were described as "little known primordial deities."

It has additionally been proposed that hawurni and the name of the Kassite god Ḫarbe are cognates. However, according to Wilfred G. Lambert his name might be an appellative meaning "lord."
