= Pišaišapḫi =

Hurrian mountain god

- Mountain god

Pišaišapḫi (also spelled Pišašapḫi) was a Hurrian mountain god. His name was derived from that of the associated mountain, Pišaiša, which was most likely located next the Mediterranean coast. He is attested in Hurrian and Hittite ritual texts from cities such as Hattusa, Šapinuwa and Ugarit. A Hittite literary text known as Myth of Pišaiša is focused on him, though its origin and the reading of the names of other deities who play roles in it remains a matter of debate among researchers.

== Name and character ==
The Hurrian theonym Pišaišapḫi had multiple phonetic writings, such as Pí-ša-ša-ap-ḫi, Pí-ša-i-ša-ap-ḫi or Wi_{i}-ša-i-ša-ap-ḫi, which are attested both with and without the “divine determinative” (dingir) preceding the first sign. It is derived from the name of a mountain, Pišaiša, combined with a Hurrian genitive ending and nisba, and as such can be translated as "he of Mount Pišaiša". Pišaišapḫi and Mount Pišaiša could both be used as the name of the deity, though the former is more common in known sources. True to his name, he was regarded as a mountain god. He is sometimes paired with a second similar figure, Ḫatni, though in known texts the latter never appears alone.

In the Ugaritic alphabetic script, the name was rendered as pḏḏpḫ. Dennis Pardee, who vocalizes this form of the name as Piḏaḏapḫi, erroneously refers to this figure as a “Hurrian goddess of unknown characteristics.” A hieroglyphic writing, possibly (DEUS)Pi-sa_{4}-sà-pa, has been identified in Yazılıkaya. Relief 26 from this site, which is located between Ugur and a number of unknown deities, might be a depiction of him, though this is not entirely certain.

Mount Pišaiša was most likely located in the proximity of the Mediterranean coast. Alfonso Archi argues that a list of mountains written in Hurrian which mentions Pišaiša alongside Ammarik, originally worshiped as a god in Ebla, can be interpreted as evidence for a Syrian location. It has also been proposed that Pišaiša might be the Hurrian name of Mount Amanus.

== Worship ==
Pišaišapḫi is well attested in Hurro-Hittite offering lists from Hattusa. He also appears in kaluti from Šapinuwa, where he is placed alongside Ḫatni after the war god Ḫešui and before Earth and Heaven. In a number of religious texts, such as a Hurrian ritual from Kizzuwatna (KUB 45.21), he appears in association with Šauška. He was also among the deities celebrated in the ḫišuwa festival, during which he received an offering of sourdough bread alongside deities such as the “Lady of the Palace” and Šuwala. A ritual inventory mentions a lion-shaped rhyton dedicated to him.

As the mountain Pišaiša, Pišaišapḫi appears in a number of Hittite treaties alongside Lablana and Šariyana, possibly to be interpreted as Mount Lebanon and Mount Hermon (Sirion). In this context he functioned as an oath deity. The name of the mountain is also attested as a theophoric element in Hurrian given names. One example is Ḫazip-Pišapḫi, “Mount Pišaiša granted” from Tell Leilan.

Pišaišapḫi was also among the Hurrian deities worshiped in Ugarit. He is attested in the ritual text RS 24.261 which contains sections in both Hurrian and Ugaritic, and describes a ceremony focused on the local Ashtart and Hurrian Šauška which took place in a temple associated with them. In the enumeration of deities receiving offerings during this ritual, he appears alone in line 18, immediately after Anat and Šimige (line 17), and before Ḫepat and Takitu (line 19).

== Mythology ==
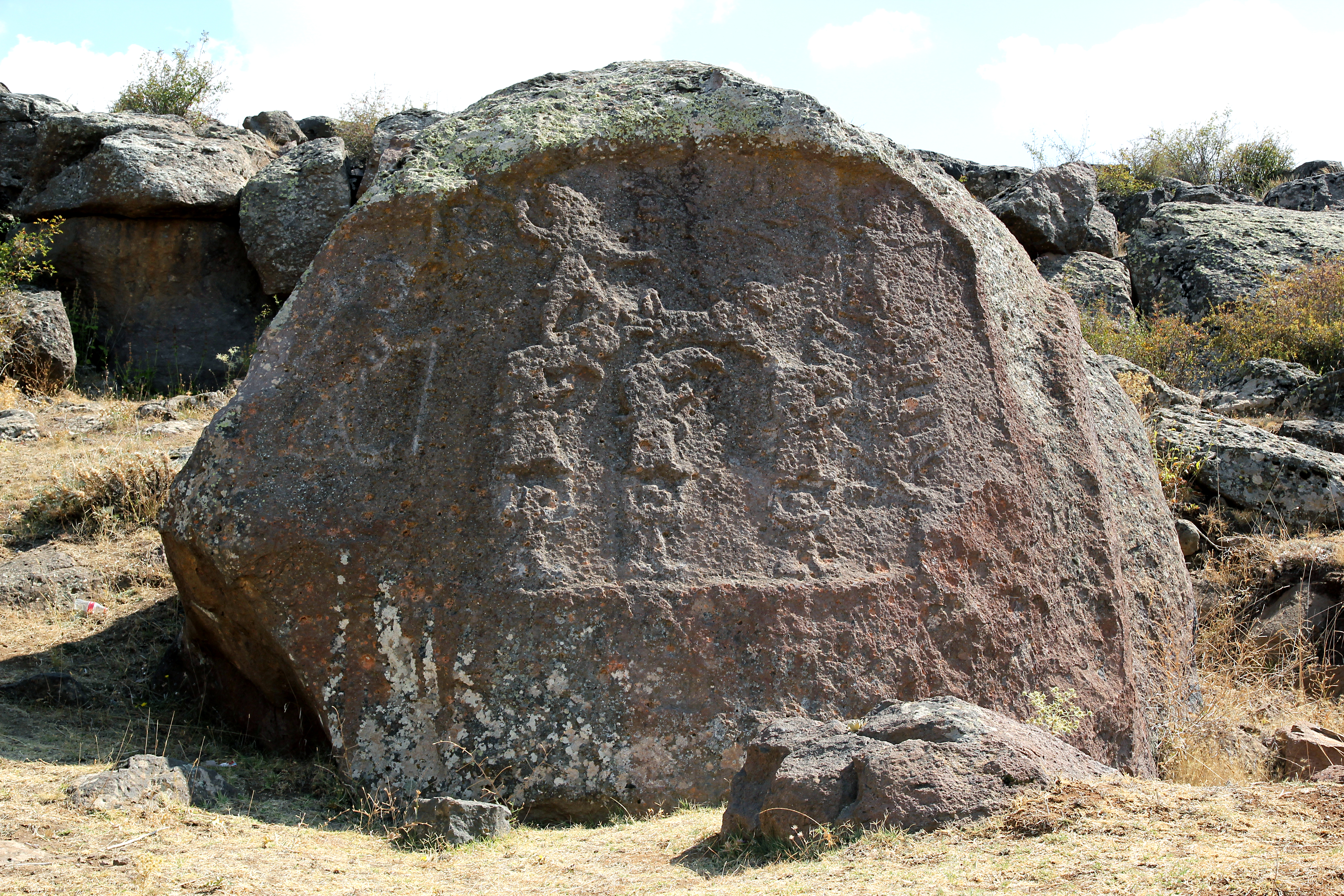
A possible depiction of events of the Myth of Pišaiša on the İmamkullu relief.

Pišaišapḫi appears in a text written in Hittite referred to as the Myth of Pišaiša (CTH 350.3). In the beginning, he notices a resting naked goddess, designated by the logogram IŠTAR. He rapes her. She seemingly declares that he is now the enemy of the weather god. Pišaišapḫi, scared of possible consequences, prostrates himself and promises to tell her the story of the weapon weather god used to defeat the sea, which according to Noga Ayali-Darshan's interpretation was subsequently used by mountains to defeat him in turn. In Alfonso Archi's explanation of the same text, the order of events is reversed, and the battle of the sea took place after the conflict with the mountains. After this allusion to a rebellion of the mountain gods, Namni and Ḫazzi are mentioned in an unknown role and the tablet breaks off.

The myth is commonly described as a translation of a Canaanite composition. Volkert Haas agreed with the classification of this myth as originally Canaanite, though he noted it should be considered the result of a long period of contact between speakers of Semitic languages and Hurrian. Jared L. Miller and Alfonso Archi refer to it as “Hurro-Canaanite”. Nicla De Zorzi classifies it as “Hurro-Hittite” instead. Piotr Taracha similarly counts it among Hittite adaptations of Hurrian myths, alongside the cycle of Kumarbi, the Song of Release and other compositions. According to Noga Ayali-Darshan it is more likely to reflect an originally Hurrian, rather than Canaanite, tradition, as indicated by complete absence of Pišaišapḫi from known texts written in any West Semitic language. She also notes that a phrase describing Pišaišapḫi's prostration, which compares this action to the fall of an apple from a tree, belongs to the Hurrian milieu. She argues the setting of the myth might reflect origin in inland Syria. Ian Rutherford points out the story has no clear parallel in any texts written in any Semitic languages. Daniel Schwemer remarks that it shows a thematic similarity with the Mesopotamian myth Inanna and Ebiḫ, but states that a certain connection cannot be established. Taracha assumes that the goddess appearing in this myth is Šauška, though she has also been interpreted as Ishtar. If the Canaanite origin of the myth is presumed, the weather god is accordingly interpreted as Baal, though he might also be Hurrian Teššub.

It has been proposed that the İmamkullu relief might be a pictorial representation of the events described in the Myth of Pišaiša, with the figures depicted being Pišaišapḫi, Šauška, Teššub riding in his chariot, and the pair Namni and Ḫazzi. Additionally, the appearance of IŠTAR/Šauška and Pišaišapḫi in sequence in two ritual texts, KBo 14.142 I 10 and KUB 27.13 I 7, has been interpreted as a reference to it.
