= Upelluri =

- Primordial giant
- Abode: the "Dark Earth"
- Gender: Male
- Ethnic group: Hurrians, Hittites

Upelluri or Ubelluri was a primordial giant in Hurrian mythology.

He is only known from the Song of Ullikummi, which is one of the few Hurrian texts offering a view of this culture's cosmology. It was believed that Upelluri was already alive during the separation of heaven and earth, which were placed on his back, and that he lived in the "Dark Earth," the Hurrian underworld. His name ends with the Hurrian suffix -luri, known also from the names of the mountain goddess Lelluri and the sukkal (attendant deity) of the sea god Kiaše, Impaluri, as well as a number of Hurrian mountain and stone names.

It has been pointed out that the later Greek Atlas plays a cosmological role similar to that of Upelluri.

== The Song of Ullikummi ==
Upelluri appears in the Song of Ullikummi, which known from poorly preserved fragments of a Hurrian original and a more complete Hittite translation. In this text, the eponymous monster is placed on his right shoulder by servants of Kumarbi, Irširra, so that he can grow away from the sight of the allies of Kumarbi's enemy Teshub, such as the sun god Šimige.

Later the god Ea seeks Upelluri out in order to find out how to defeat Ullikummi, and asks him if he is aware of the identity of the monster growing on his back. As it turns out, Upelluri did not notice the new burden at first, but eventually he starts to feel discomfort, something he did not experience even during the separation of heaven and earth. The rest of the tablet is broken, and the next preserved scene does not feature Upelluri anymore.
