= Ḫedammu =

Sea-dragon from Hurrian-Hittite mythology

Ḫedammu, Hurrian Apše ("Snake"), is a sea-dragon from Hurrian-Hittite mythology, which caused trouble on the Syrian coast. His Hittite counterpart was Illuyanka.

Ḫedammu is the son of the god Kumarbi and Šertapšuruḫi, the daughter of the personification of the sea, Kiaše. The sea-dragon possessed an enormous appetite and nearly consumed the goddess Šauška (^{d}IŠTAR), but was eventually defeated by her charms and she gives birth to snakes from him.

== Bibliography ==
- Volkert Haas: Die hethitische Literatur. Texte, Stilistik, Motive. Walter de Gruyter GmbH & Co. KG, Berlin etc. 2006, ISBN 3-11-018877-5, pp. 153 ff.
