= Ullikummi =

Giant stone monster in Hurrian mythology

- Stone Giant

Genealogy
- Parents: Kumarbi and daughter of the sea god
- Siblings: Teshub

In Hurrian mythology, Ullikummi is a giant stone monster, son of Kumarbi and the sea god's daughter, Sertapsuruhi, or a female cliff. The language of the literary myth in its existing redaction is Hittite, in cuneiform texts recovered at Bogaskoy, where some Hurrian fragments of the Song of Ullikummi have been found. See Guterbock (1951).

The Song of Ullikummi was recognized from its first rediscovery as a predecessor of Greek myths in Hesiod. Parallels to the Greek myth of Typhon, the ancient antagonist of the thunder-god Zeus, have been elucidated by Burkert. The Song possesses information on the Hittite creation myth, including the idea that there was a separation of heaven and earth in the primordial past, before which, the two were united.

== The story of Ullikummi ==
The narrative of Ullikummi is one episode, the best preserved and most complete, in an epic cycle of related "songs" about the god Kumarbi, who aimed to replace the weather god Teshub and destroy the city of Kummiya; to this end Kumarbi fathered upon a rock cliff a genderless, deaf, blind, yet sentient volcanic rock monster, Ullikummi, which he hid in the netherworld and placed on the shoulder of Upelluri. Upelluri, absorbed in his meditations, did not feel Ullikummi on his shoulder. (Note: Upelluri stands in the netherworld, holding the earth and sky on his shoulder like the Greek Atlas; a mere giant such as Ullikummi is barely noticeable, although Upelluri does feel a bit of pain in his shoulder once Ullikummi has grown up.)

Ullikummi grew quickly until he reached the heavens. Ullikummi's brother Teshub thundered and rained on Ullikummi, but it did not harm him. Teshub fled and abdicated the throne. (Note: The weather god and his vizier and brother, Tasmisu, are defeated in their first battle with Ullikummi, as Tasmisu relates to Teshub's wife, Hebat; as a result Teshub is banished to a "little place," probably meaning a grave.) Teshub asked Ea for help. (Note: Ea, who lives in the Apsu, underground source of earth's waters, obtains the toothed cutting tool with which heaven and earth were cut apart shortly after creation; this tool will disable Ullikummi.) Ea visited Upelluri and cut off the feet of Ullikummi, toppling him (Note: That is, Ea cuts Ullikummi loose from Upelluri's shoulder and then urges the weather god to fight again; the end of the story is broken away and scholars simply assume Ullikummi is finally defeated.)

== Sources ==
- Burkert, Walter. (1979). "Von Ullikummi zum Kaukasus: Die Felsgeburt des Unholds", Würzburger Jahrbücher N.F., 5, pp 253–261.
- Burkert, Walter. Oriental and Greek Mythology, pp. 19–24.
- Guterbock, Hans Gustav (1951–1952). "The Song of Ullikummi: Revised Text of the Hittite Version of a Hurrian Myth" Journal of Cuneiform Studies 5 (4), pp 135–161, (1951); 6 (1), pp 8–42, (1952) and in succeeding issues.
- Haas, Volkert. (2006). Die hethitische Literatur: Texte, Stilistik, Motive. Berlin: Walter de Gruyter, pp 130–176.
- Hoffner, H. A. Jr. (1990). "The Song of Hedammu". Hittite Myths, pp 48–57. Atlanta.
