= Aranzaḫ =

Hurrian river god

- Deification of the river Tigris

Genealogy
- Parents: Anu and Kumarbi
- Siblings: Teshub, Tašmišu

Equivalents
- Mesopotamian: Idiqlat

Aranzaḫ (alternatively romanized as Aranzah), also known as Aranziḫ or Araššiḫ was a Hurrian deity who represented the river Tigris. He was believed to be one of the deities born as a result of Kumarbi biting off the genitals of Anu during a battle over kingship in heaven. He also appears in a myth focused on a hero named after him, Gurparanzaḫ, (Note: Also romanized as Kurparanzah) in which he acts as his ally. He is also attested in numerous Hurrian theophoric names. A number of attestations of his name have been identified in Ugaritic and Mesopotamian texts as well. Additionally, it has been suggested that the Assyrian references to offerings made to the source of the Tigris in Shubria in the first millennium BCE were linked to earlier Hurrian worship of the Tigris as a deity.

== Name and character ==
It is presumed that Aranzaḫ, the name used by Hurrians to refer to the river Tigris, (Note: In contrast with Aranzaḫ, Hurrians had no own name for the Euphrates.) has Hurrian origin, but its precise etymology remains unknown. The river was perceived as a numen in Hurrian religion. Aranzaḫ could also be understood as the name of a river god representing it. It is agreed he was a male deity.

=== Other deifications of the Tigris ===
Ran Zadok compares attestations of Aranzaḫ in Hurrian theophoric names to Akkadian names such as Migir-Idiqlat. They similarly reflect the perception of the Tigris as a deity. Sumerian theophoric names invoking deified Tigris, for example Ur-Idigina, are known too, but they are less common. In a single source, the deified Tigris, referred to as Idiqlat, appears as a servant of Enlil, while in the Old Babylonian forerunner of the later god list An = Anum the same deity is counted as a member of the circle of Enki.

== Mythology ==
Aranzaḫ is among the deities who appear in the so-called Kumarbi Cycle, a group of loosely connected Hurrian myths which describe a conflict between Teshub and Kumarbi. According to Harry Hoffner it can be presumed that he was counted among the allies of the former of the two combatants. His origin is s described in the Song of Going Forth, also known as Song of Emergence and in older publications as Song of Kumarbi. During a conflict over kingship in heaven, Kumarbi bites off the genitals of Anu, who earlier deposed the primordial god Alalu, and as a result becomes impregnated with a number of deities, including the representation of the Tigris. Anu proceeds to taunt him about this:

Do not rejoice over your belly, for I have placed a burden in your belly. First, I have impregnated you with the mighty Storm-god. Second, I have impregnated you with the River Tigris, not to be borne. Third, I have impregnated you with the mighty Tašmišu. I have placed three frightful deities as a burden in your belly, and you will end up banging your head against the rocks of Mt. Tašša!

A further section of the same myth likely describes the birth of Aranzaḫ. This seemingly occurs after Kumarbi's skull was broken and subsequently mended to enable the birth of Teshub, and thus it is not certain how the other child came to be born. According to Volkert Haas, Kumarbi spat him out on the mountain Kanzura. This interpretation relies on the assumption that Kanzura was understood as the source of the Tigris, but according to Erik van Dongen it is not plausible, and it seems the mountain is only mentioned after the presumed birth of Aranzaḫ. He notes it cannot however be ruled out that the newborn river god was instantly taken to Kanzura. According to Gary Beckman, while Kumarbi does spit out one of his sons on Kanzura, the passage refers to Tašmišu (under the name of his Hittite counterpart, Šuwaliyat) and Aranzaḫ is only born later, exiting Kumarbi's body through unknown means.

A reference to someone being pregnant with Aranzaḫ is also present in Ea and the Beast, which might represent a different version of the same tale or a different part of the same cycle of myths. The text is focused on prophecies issued by suppalanza, an unidentified animal, to Ea. Based on the references to birth of deities and the presence of Aranzaḫ it has been proposed that they might deal with the rise of Teshub and his conflict with Kumarbi.

Aranzaḫ is one of the main characters in the myth of Gurparanzaḫ, (Note: Also romanized as Kurparanzah) whose eponymous protagonist is a king whose name can be translated as "quiver of Aranzaḫ". He is said to rule the city of Ailanuwa, which has not been located yet. It is not mentioned in any other texts, though according to Franca Pecchioli Daddi its name might be a Hittite variant of Alilanum, a city located in the proximity of the Khabur and Sinjar Mountains whose Hurrian king, Masum-atal, is mentioned in texts from Tell Leilan. The river god is portrayed as Gurparanzaḫ's ally. He has been interpreted as his personal protective deity.

It is estimated that the tale of Gurparanzaḫ was originally a lengthy composition, but only a few small late Hittite fragments of it survive. Two episodes have been reconstructed, but the order in which they should be arranged is not certain. The narrative takes place in Akkad. The choice of this location is presumed to reflect its perception as the ideal example of governance in early Hurrian tradition. The section of the text usually presumed to be its beginning describes how Gurparanzaḫ gained renown during a hunt organized by a king of Akkad, Impakru, how he was chosen to marry his daughter Tadizuli, and how he won an archery competition. Aranzaḫ himself only takes an active role later on, when Gurparanzaḫ and Tadizuli are separated prior to consummation of the marriage. It is possible that the latter of the protagonists urges him to intervene. According to Mary R. Bachvarova's interpretation, he takes the form of an eagle to travel. He flies off to find Gurparanzaḫ, who is grieving alongside the other participants of the competition in the city of Nuadu, and inquires him about the cause of his sadness. His response apparently deals with the matter of his wife's dowry, but its interpretation is uncertain. Aranzaḫ then meets with fate goddesses to seek advice, as the fate of mortals depends on their decisions. The final preserved paragraph before the text breaks off mentions Aranzaḫ and the fate goddesses once again.

As the name of the river Tigris, Aranzaḫ is mentioned in the Hittite adaptation of šar tamḫāri. This composition focuses on Sargon's expedition to lands to the northwest of the Akkadian Empire. According to the Hittite version, on the way to Purushanda Sargon made a sacrifice of one ox and seven sheep to Aranzaḫ. This combination of sacrificial animals is otherwise rare in Hittite texts.

== Miscellaneous attestations ==
Similarly to other rivers, mountains and cities regarded as numinous in Hurrian religion, Aranzaḫ could be invoked in theophoric names. Multiple examples are known. Some already occur in sources from the Old Babylonian period. While most rivers appear only in names with the element ar- and its derivatives, multiple predicatives are attested in the case of Aranzaḫ, including arip-, ḫašip-, -atal, -iwri and kirip-, in addition to use of hypocoristics such as Aranzi, which according to Ran Zadok might reflect the antiquity of their use, stemming from Hurrian culture plausibly originating in the proximity of the Tigris. A certain Ḫazip-Aranziḫ, "Aranzaḫ granted", appears in an enumeration of men sent to Mari by allies of king Zimri-Lim and local officials responsible for their reception as a member of the latter group. Other individuals bearing names invoking Aranzaḫ have been identified in texts from sites located in all regions inhabited by Hurrians, for example Chagar Bazar, Tell al-Rimah, and Tikunani.

The toponym ʾArššiḫu (ʾaršḫ in the Ugaritic alphabetic script), mentioned as the destination of Hauron in a historiola in RS 24.244, one of the Ugaritic texts, according to Dennis Pardee is an Ugaritic form of the Hurrian name of the Tigris, though he notes that in this context the name seems to refer to a city, which is unparalleled.

The Mesopotamian lexical list Malku (tablet II, line 46) records "Aranzû" and "Aransuḫ" as the Hurrian names of the Tigris. A presumed Hittite derivative of the name, Arazaḫi, is also attested in Akkadian texts from Hattusa.

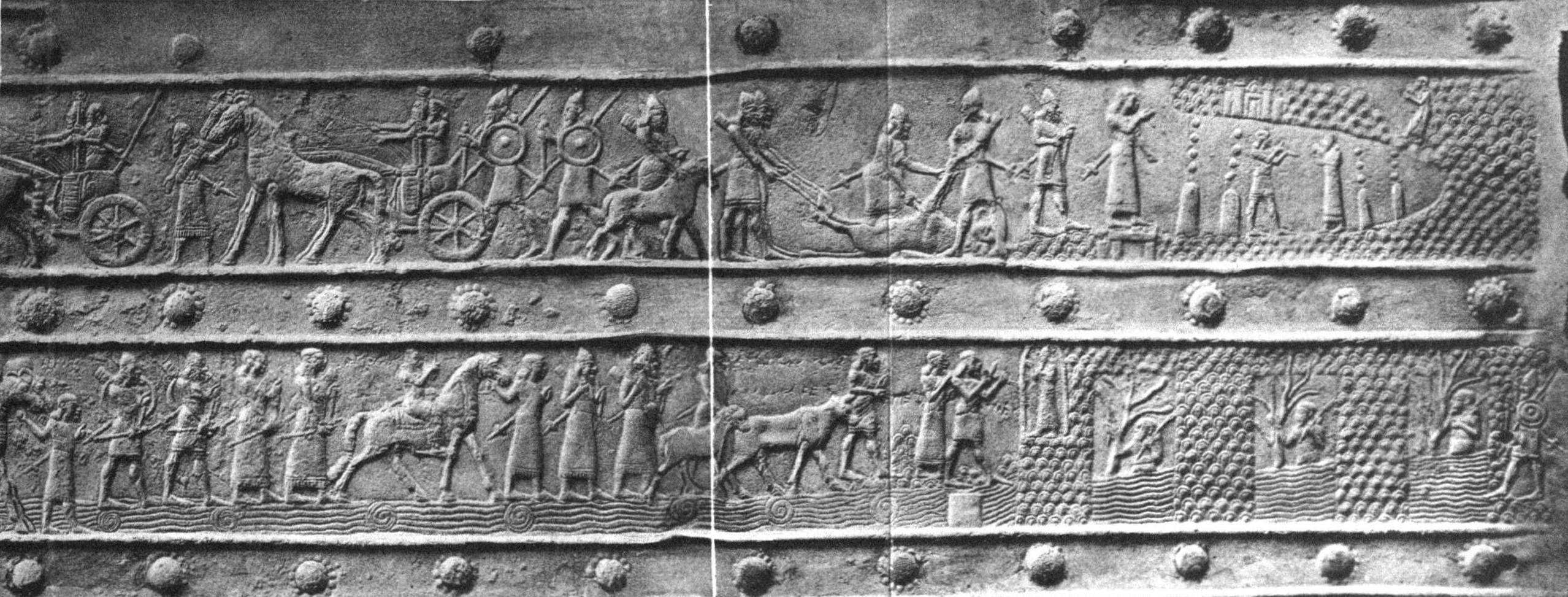
A depiction of the expedition to the source of the Tigris on the Balawat Gates.

According to Karen Radner, the importance of the Tigris Grotto in Shubria in the first millennium BCE, comparable to the position of Kumme and Musasir, can be connected to Hurrian traditions pertaining to the worship of the river as a deity. Shubria is only the Assyrian name of this area, derived from earlier terms Subir and Subartu, generic designations for northern lands, and its indigenous name is not known, but it can be assumed it was culturally Hurrian. Very little is known about its religion, though it is known that the Tigris Grotto ("Tigris source") was visited by Tiglath-Pileser I and Shalmaneser III to make sacrifices, which might indicate it was an internationally renowned religious site. The visit of the latter king is among the scenes depicted on the Balawat Gates (band X). As Shubria is well attested as a destination for refugees from Urartu and Assyria, including inhabitants of cities as distant as Me-Turan in the Diyala valley, it is possible that a custom of granting religiously motivated asylum in the proximity of the surrounding holy precinct was observed by local inhabitants.
