= Kumarbi =

Hurrian father of the gods

- Former king of the gods, father of the gods, god of prosperity and grain
- Major cult center: Urkesh, Azuḫinnu, Taite
- Abode: Underworld
- Symbol: Ear of grain

Genealogy
- Parents: Alalu
- Consort: Shalash
- Children: Teshub, Tašmišu, Aranzaḫ (Tigris), Silver (Ušḫune), Ḫedammu, Ullikummi, possibly Šauška

Equivalents
- Mesopotamian: Enlil
- Syrian: Dagan
- Ugaritic: El
- Greek: Kronos

Kumarbi, also known as Kumurwe, Kumarwi and Kumarma, was a Hurrian god. He held a senior position in the Hurrian pantheon, and was described as the "father of gods". He was portrayed as an old, deposed king of the gods, though this most likely did not reflect factual loss of the position of the head of the pantheon in Hurrian religion, but only a mythological narrative. It is often assumed that he was an agricultural deity, though this view is not universally accepted and the evidence is limited. He was also associated with prosperity. It was believed that he resided in the underworld.

Multiple Hurrian deities were regarded as Kumarbi's children, including Teshub, whom he conceived after biting off the genitals of Anu. They were regarded as enemies. In myths dealing with the conflict between them Kumarbi fathers various enemies meant to supplant the weather god, such as the stone giant Ullikummi. Kumarbi was also closely associated with other deities who were regarded as the "fathers of gods" in their respective pantheons. As early as in the eighteenth century BCE, he came to be linked with Dagan, the head god of the pantheon of inland Syria in the Bronze Age. Both of them were associated with the goddess Shalash, and with the Mesopotamian god Enlil. From the sixteenth century BCE onward, and possibly also earlier, Kumarbi and Enlil were viewed as equivalents, though they were not necessarily conflated with each other, and could appear as two distinct figures in the same myths. A trilingual version of the Weidner god list from Ugarit presents both Kumarbi and Enlil as the equivalents of the local god El. A tentative restoration of a bilingual version from Emar might also indicate he could be associated with Ištaran.

The worship of Kumarbi is attested from sites located in all areas inhabited by the Hurrians, from Anatolia to the Zagros Mountains, though it has been argued that his importance in the sphere of cult was comparatively minor. The oldest possible reference to him occurs in a royal inscription from Urkesh from either the Akkadian or Ur III period, though the correct reading of the name of the deity meant is a matter of scholarly debate. He is also already referenced in texts from Mari from the early second millennium BCE. Further attestations are available from Ugarit, Alalakh, and from the eastern kingdom of Arrapḫa, where he was worshiped in Azuḫinnu. Furthermore, he was incorporated into the Hittite pantheon, and as one of its members appears in texts from Hattusa, presumed to reflect the traditions of Kizzuwatna. A depiction of him has been identified among the gods from the Yazılıkaya sanctuary. In the first millennium BCE he continued to be worshiped in Taite, and as one of its deities he is attested in the Assyrian Tākultu rituals. He is also attested in Luwian inscriptions from sites such as Carchemish and Tell Ahmar.

Multiple myths focused on Kumarbi are known. Many of them belong to the so-called Kumarbi Cycle, which describes the struggle for kingship among the gods between him and Teshub. The texts usually agreed to belong to it include the Song of Kumarbi (likely originally known as Song of Emergence), the Song of LAMMA, the Song of Silver, the Song of Ḫedammu and the Song of Ullikummi. Kumarbi is portrayed in them as a scheming deity who raises various challengers to depose or destroy Teshub. His plans are typically successful in the short term, but ultimately the adversaries he creates are defeated by the protagonists. Further texts argued to also be a part of the cycle include the Song of the Sea, the Song of Oil, and other fragmentary narratives. Kumarbi also appears in an adaptation of Atrahsasis, where he plays the role which originally belonged to Enlil. Myths focused on him are often compared to other narratives known from the tradition of other neighboring cultures, such as Mesopotamian Theogony of Dunnu or Ugaritic Baal Cycle. It is also commonly assumed that they were an influence on Theogony, especially on the succession of divine rulers and on the character of Kronos. Further works argued to show similar influences include the Phoenician History of Philo of Byblos and various Orphic theogonies, such as that known from the Derveni papyrus.

== Name ==
In standard syllabic cuneiform, the theonym Kumarbi was written as ^{d}Ku-mar-bi. A byform, Kumurwe, is attested in sources from Nuzi. In Ugaritic texts written in the local alphabetic cuneiform script it was rendered as kmrb (𐎋𐎎𐎗𐎁) or kmrw (𐎋𐎎𐎗𐎆), vocalized respectively as Kumarbi and Kumarwi. A late variant, Kumarma, appears in hieroglyphic Luwian inscriptions, where it is rendered with the signs (DEUS)BONUS, “the good god”. The correct reading has been determined based on a syllabic spelling identified in an inscription from Tell Ahmar, (DEUS.BONUS)ku-mara/i+ra/i-ma-sa_{5}.

Kumarbi’s name has Hurrian origin and can be translated as “he of Kumar”. While no such a toponym is attested in any Hurrian sources, Gernot Wilhelm notes it shows similarities to Hurrian names from the third millennium BCE and on this basis proposes that it might refer to a settlement which existed in the early period of Hurrian history, poorly documented in textual sources. He suggests that its name in turn goes back to the Hurrian root kum, “to pile up”. Examples of other analogously structured Hurrian theonyms include Nabarbi (“she of Nawar”) and possibly Ḫiriḫibi (“he of [the mountain] Ḫiriḫi”). While it has been argued that Aštabi is a further example, his name was originally spelled as Aštabil in Ebla and as such cannot be considered another structurally Kumarbi-like theonym.

=== Logographic writings ===
According to Alfonso Archi, in a number of Hurrian texts Kumarbi’s name is represented by the sumerogram ^{d}NISABA. It was also used to refer to Dagan. Archi assumes both of these scribal conventions had the same origin. In Ugaritic and related dialects Dagan’s name was a homophone of the word for grain, with both written as dgn (𐎄𐎂𐎐) in Ugaritic alphabetic texts, and the logographic writing of both his name and that of Kumarbi as ^{d}NISABA was likely an example of wordplay popular among scribes, which in this case relied on the close association between these two gods and on the fact that Nisaba’s name could function as a metonym for grain. Lluís Feliu based on the attestations of this writing from Anatolia instead suggests that it reflected a connection to the Hittite grain deity Ḫalki, who similarly could be represented by the same sumerogram. One Anatolian example of the use of ^{d}NISABA to designate Kumarbi has been identified in an offering list dealing with the deities worshiped in the Hittite city of Durmitta. Despite the different character of the two deities, there is also evidence for the use of Ḫalki’s name as a logogram to refer to Kumarbi.

== Character ==
Hurrian texts refer to Kumarbi as the “father of gods”. Volkert Haas has interpreted this as an indication that he was regarded as a creator deity. His position in the Hurrian pantheon was high, as reflected by his epithet ewri, “lord”. In myths he was portrayed as an old deposed king of the gods, replaced by his son Teshub, though this is presumed to be a fictional etiological narrative explaining the structure of the Hurrian pantheon, rather than reflection of a loss of importance at the expense of another deity. It has nonetheless been argued that the relation between them might have originally developed as a way to harmonize two originally distinct local pantheons.

It is often assumed that Kumarbi was associated with grain. However, Lluís Feliu points out that the direct evidence for his supposed agrarian character is presently limited to the fact that the sumerogram ^{d}NISABA was sometimes employed to write his name, and the identification of a plant he holds on the Yazılıkaya relief as an ear of grain. Feliu’s criticism of this characterization is supported by Alfonso Archi, who points out the ear symbol is not used elsewhere, and might only represent a play on words referencing the scribal convention of using the name of dissimilar Hittite deity Ḫalki as a logogram designating Kumarbi. Feliu points out many arguments in favor of interpreting Kumarbi as an agricultural god are based on circular reasoning, specifically on the assumption that if Dagan, closely associated with him, had agricultural character, so did he. However, Dagan was regarded as a god of broadly understood prosperity, rather than specifically agriculture. Kumarbi himself was invoked in association with prosperity in hieroglyphic Luwian inscriptions from the first millennium BCE.

The underworld could be regarded as Kumarbi’s abode, as indicated for example by an incantation according to which water from a spring located under his throne “reaches the head of the Sun goddess of the Earth”, though he was not an underworld god in the strict sense.

A single Hittite text, KUB 59.66, mentions a “star of Kumarbi”, which Volkert Haas proposed identifying with the planet Saturn.

== Associations with other deities ==
=== Family and court ===
It is assumed that Kumarbi’s father was Alalu. A direct statement confirming this relation has been identified in the text KUB 33.120 (I 19: ^{d}Kumarbiš ^{d}Alaluwaš NUMUN-ŠU). It is typically translated as “Kumarbi, the descendant of Alalu”. A further piece of evidence supporting the view are sections of treaties enumerating gods invoked as their divine witnesses, in which they could be listed in sequence. Both of them appear for example in the treaty between Hittite king Muwatalli II and Alaksandu of Wilusa. The myth establishing the relation between them, the Song of Kumarbi, seemingly involves two “dynasties” of deities competing for kingship. This assumption is nonetheless not universally accepted. An alternate interpretation is to see Alalu as the father of Anu, who reigned between Alalu and Kumarbi as the king of the gods, and grandfather of Kumarbi. However, Christian Zgoll, who supports this theory, admits that it is difficult to prove. He nonetheless questions the notion of two separate dynasties, and argues that no other examples of a theogonic myth involving two divine families is known. However, according to Wilfred G. Lambert succession involving master and servant rather than members of one family is not entirely unknown, and in addition to the account of Kumarbi’s overthrow of Anuy another example might be a section from the Theogony of Dunnu focused on a nameless figure seemingly labeled as a servant (ṣiḫru) rather than child (māru) of the god he deposes.

Shalash could be viewed as the spouse of Kumarbi. She was originally associated with Dagan, as already attested in texts from Ebla, and the link between her and Kumarbi was a later development. However, the evidence associating Shalash with Kumarbi is also used as an argument in favor of continuity of her association with Dagan. In the Hurrian column of a multilingual edition of the Weidner god list from Ugarit, a goddess named Ašte Kumurbineve, literally “wife of Kumarbi”, appears instead. However, according to Aaron Tugendhaft she is one of the deities attested in it who would be considered “pure scholarly inventions” meant to mimic Mesopotamian pairs of major gods and their wives with etymologically related names, such as Anu and Antu. In myths Kumarbi appears without a wife.

Teshub was regarded as a son of Kumarbi, conceived after he bit off and swallowed the genitals of Anu. Gary Beckman states that the weather god can thus be considered a descendant of both of the lines of gods present in the Song of Kumarbi. Due to the circumstances of the weather god’s conception, a Hurrian hymn (KUB 47.78) refers to Kumarbi as his mother:

You are the strong one, which I (praise), the bull calf of Anu! You are the strong one, which I (praise), your father Anu begot you, your mother Kumarbi brought you to life. For the city of Aleppo I summon him, Teššop, for the pure throne.

Noga Ayali-Darshan notes the relationship between Kumarbi and Teshub was portrayed as “dysfunctional” in Hurrian mythology. The other children of Kumarbi conceived the same way were Tašmišu and the river Tigris, known by the Hurrians under the name Aranzaḫ or Aranziḫ. While Šauška was regarded as a sister of both Teshub and Tašmišu, she is not mentioned among Kumarbi’s children in the Song of Kumarbi, though according to Marie-Claude Trémouille this might simply be the result of its incomplete state of preservation. She therefore argues it can nonetheless be assumed this deity was also one of the children of Kumarbi and Anu. However, according to Gary Beckman’s recent treatment of Song of Kumarbi, the text explicitly states that the eponymous god was impregnated with only three deities.

In myths dealing with his conflict with Teshub, Kumarbi is also the father of various opponents of the weather god, such as Ullikummi, Ḫedammu and Silver. (Note: Hurrian: Ušḫune) Ḫedammu’s mother was Šertapšuruḫi, a daughter of the deified sea. Silver was born to a mortal woman. Ullikummi was the product of Kumarbi’s “sexual union with a huge cliff” according to Harry Hoffner, though Daniel Schwemer instead assumes that the passage describing his conception alludes to a goddess related to stones. The former two of these three children of Kumarbi appear together in a ritual text (KUB 27.38) which states that he planned for both of them to become the king of the gods. The text places the so-called “divine determinative” (dingir) before the name of Ḫedammu, but not Silver. Both of them are also described with the terms šarra, used to refer to mythical, deified rulers and ewri, which designated non-supernatural kings.

Like all other major Hurrian gods, Kumarbi was believed to be served by a divine “vizier”, Mukišānu. His name was derived from the toponym Mukiš. A single text from Ugarit instead describes Šarruma as the deity playing this role, but he is better attested in association with Ḫepat and Teshub. In myths belonging to the Kumarbi is also aided by the deified sea, who acts as his counsellor. In Song of Ḫašarri, a reference is made to a group of wandering deities referred to as the "Seven Eyes of Kumarbi", possibly analogous to Ḫutellurra. The circle of deities associated with him additionally included the so-called “former gods”, referred to as ammadena enna in Hurrian and karuilieš šiuneš in Hittite. They were portrayed as his helpers in myths. However, the same group of deities could also be affiliated with Allani.

=== Kumarbi and other “fathers of gods” ===
Kumarbi was closely associated with Dagan, the head god of the pantheon of inland Syria in the Bronze Age. The association goes back at least to the eighteenth century BCE. It has been proposed that Kumarbi’s character was in part influenced by him, or even that he originally developed as the Hurrian counterpart of this god. In Assyriology the identification of these two gods has been first pointed out by Emmanuel Laroche. Direct equations between Dagan and Kumarbi are absent from god lists, but other evidence in favor of identification of the two is available, including their similar position in the respective pantheons as the “fathers of gods” and especially the weather god, (Note: However, the relation between Dagan and the corresponding weather god, Baal/Hadad, was not regarded as hostile unlike that between Kumarbi and his son Teshub.) and their shared association with Shalash and Enlil. Furthermore, Tuttul, the cult center of Dagan, is mentioned as a city associated with Kumarbi in the Song of Ḫedammu. It is also sometimes assumed Kumarbi could be outright referred to as “Dagan of the Hurrians”. However, this assumptions rests on the proposed reading of a single inscription from Terqa from the end of the Old Babylonian period, in which Šunuḫru-ammu, a ruler of the kingdom of Ḫana, mentions the sacrifice he made to Dagan ša ḪAR-ri. The proposal that the epithet should be interpreted as ša Ḫur-ri, “of the Hurrians”, has originally been made by Ignace J. Gelb, and subsequently found support of authors such as Volkert Haas, Ichiro Nakata, Karel van der Toorn and Alfonso Archi. However, Lluís Feliu argues it should be read as ša ḫar-ri based on a reference to a similar epithet of Dagan, en ḫa-ar-ri, in a text from Emar, and rules out a reference to Hurrians or Kumarbi being the intent.

As early as in the sixteenth century BCE Kumarbi also started to be equated with the Mesopotamian god Enlil due to both of them being regarded as the “fathers of gods” in their respective pantheons. The tradition might have been older, possibly going as far back as the end of the third millennium BCE. Lluís Feliu proposes that a damaged line from the later god list An = Anum which describes a deity whose name is not preserved as the “Enlil of Subartu” might refer to Kumarbi. However, Enlil and Kumarbi are for the most part treated as two separate figures in Hurrian myths, for example in the Song of Kumarbi Enlil and Ninlil are among the deities invited by the narrator to listen to the story of Kumarbi, while in the Song of Ullikummi, Enlil makes a brief appearance to comment on Kumarbi’s plan to create the eponymous monster to destroy Teshub. Alfonso Archi additionally notes that the notion of equivalence between the two was seemingly unknown to the Hittites, even though Hittite sources do indicate awareness of both of them as individual deities. He concludes the association between them should be understood as an example of what he deems “translation” of deities with similar positions meant to facilitate the understanding of different pantheons, rather than syncretism.

The trilingual version of the Weidner god list from Ugarit in addition to equating Kumarbi with Enlil also presents him as analogous to El, a god who in the local pantheon fulfilled a role similar to Dagan in inland Syria. However, ritual texts where the two of them appear as separate figures are also known. Franks Simons has additionally suggested that a bilingual edition of the same god list known from Emar might equate Kumarbi with the high ranked but poorly known Mesopotamian god Ištaran, possibly also due to his presumed role as a “father of gods”. The theonym he restores as Ištaran is rendered logographically as KA.DI.DI rather than the expected KA.DI, which he argues represents a dittographic error (unnecessary duplication of a sign), while the restoration of Kumarbi’s name relies on the presence of the signs KU.MA in the Hurrian section of the same entry, which might reflect the spelling of his name used in Nuzi. He suggests that this equation would not necessarily contradict the fact the copy from Ugarit equates Kumarbi with Enlil, as the smaller size of the Hurrian pantheon necessitated using the same deities as translations of multiple Mesopotamian ones in god lists, as evident in the case of Šimige, equated both with Utu and Lugalbanda in such a context. However, it has been questioned if the multilingual editions of the Weidner god list can be considered an accurate source of information about Hurrian religion.

== Worship ==
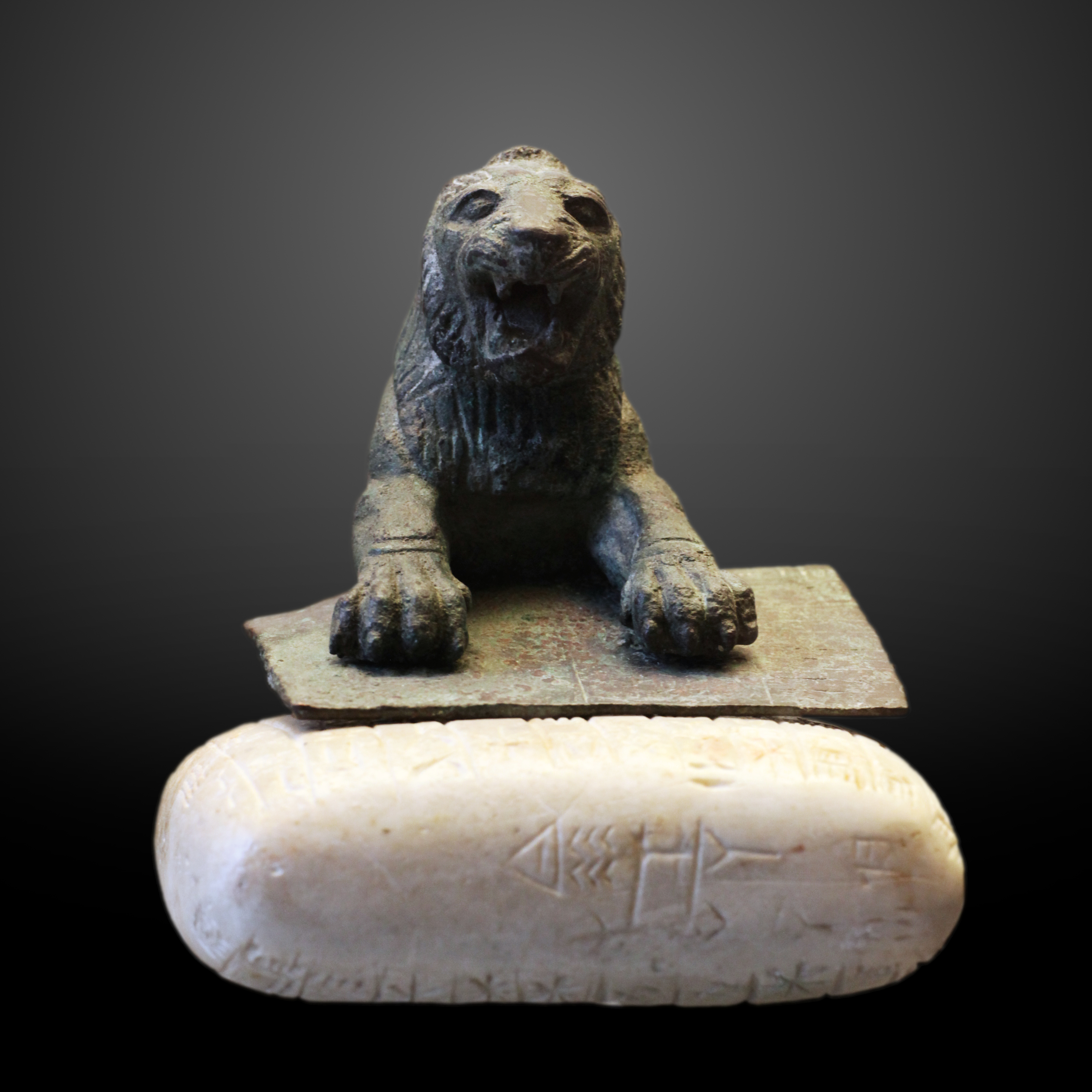
A copy of inscription of Tiš-atal on a foundation peg from Urkesh. Louvre.

Kumarbi was one of the deities regarded as “pan-Hurrian”. As such, he was worshiped in all areas inhabited by the Hurrians, from southeastern Anatolia in the west to the Zagros Mountains in the east. However, it has been argued that his importance in the sphere of cult was relatively minor and references to him in religious texts are relatively rare. Volkert Haas has argued that he originated in the Khabur area. References to him have been identified in texts from Ugarit, Mari, Nuzi and Hattusa. In sources from the last of these sites, he is commonly linked to Urkesh (Tell Mozan), a city located in Upper Mesopotamia already known from sources from the Akkadian period. It has been argued that a reference to him might already occur in a building inscription of Tiš-atal, a local ruler of this city during the times of either the Akkadian Empire or the Third Dynasty of Ur:

Tiš-atal, endan of Urkiš, built the temple of the god Kumarbi(?). May the god Lubadaga protect this temple. As for the one who destroys it, may the god Lubadaga destroy (him). May the (weather-god?) not hear his prayer. May the lady of Nagar, the sun-god, (and) the storm-god(?) [...] him who destroys it.

The deity presumed to be Kumarbi by a number of authors is designated in this context by the sumerogram ^{d}KIŠ.GAL, normally used to refer to Nergal. Alfonso Archi agrees that the logogram might designate a Hurrian deity, though he instead proposes Aštabi, and based on other Hurrian evidence notes that the possibility that Nergal was meant cannot be ruled out. Doubts have also been expressed by Gernot Wilhelm, who states that while not entirely implausible, the proposal that Kumarbi is represented by a sumerogram in the inscription is impossible to prove. Beate Pongratz-Leisten tentatively refers to both Nergal and Kumarbi as possible identities of the deity of Urkesh.

A temple found during excavations of Urkesh which remained in use from the third millennium BCE to the end of the Mitanni empire has been interpreted as possibly dedicated to Kumarbi. The apu, a type of offering pit, from the same site might have also been linked to him. A unique seal from Urkesh depicting a deity striding over a mountain range has also been described as a possible depiction of Kumarbi. It has been noted that it finds no close parallels among similar works of art known from southern Mesopotamia.

Early attestations of Kumarbi are also present in sources from Mari. Gernot Wilhelm argues that the oldest certain reference to him occurs in a tablet from this city inscribed with a Hurrian text, dated to roughly 1700 BCE. In an incantation, he is mentioned alongside Pidenḫi, an epithet of Shalash:

The tooth wails! The tooth sounds out! They (the teeth) cry out to mother Pidenḫi, to father Kumarbi!

It has been suggested that it was meant to cure toothache. However, it is not certain why Kumarbi and Shalash would be invoked in connection with teeth.

A further city in modern Syria from which evidence for the worship of Kumarbi is available is Ugarit. Hurrian offering lists from this city place him after a “god father” (a “generic ancestor of the gods”) and El (otherwise absent from Hurrian tradition). This sequence corresponds to the enumeration of Ilib, El and Dagan in similar texts written in Ugaritic or Akkadian. In KTU^{3} 1.110, a description of a type of sacrifice (aṯḫulumma), Kumarbi instead appears after Kušuḫ. A Hurrian incantation, KTU^{3} 1.44 (RS 1.007), mentions that he was worshiped “from Tuttul to Awirraše”. The latter settlement was presumably located in western Syria. Further cult centers of Kumarbi mentioned in the Ugaritic texts include Kumma (or Kummi) and Uriga. The latter toponym has alternatively been interpreted as Urkesh. References to Kumarbi have also been identified in texts from Alalakh, with one example being tablet A1T 15 which mentions a priest in his service, a certain Kabiya, though there is presently no indication that any of the structures discovered during excavations was dedicated to him. Piotr Taracha additionally tentatively suggests that the city deity of Emar, who he refers to as Il Imari (“the god of Emar”) following the earlier proposal of Joan Goodnick Westenholz, might have been understood as a manifestation of either Kumarbi or Dagan.

Kumarbi was also worshiped further east in Azuḫinnu, a city located in the kingdom of Arrapḫa, in the proximity of modern Kirkuk. The local pantheon was apparently jointly headed by him and Šauška. In some of the offering lists from Nuzi linked to this location he is preceded by the deity Kurwe, who might have been the city god of Azuḫinnu.

Kumarbi’s name is not common in the Hurrian onomasticon. He is entirely absent from the earliest known Hurrian personal names from the Ur III and Old Babylonian periods, though it has been noted they usually were not theophoric, in contrast with these from later sites such as Nuzi, and that other major deities, like Šimige, Kušuḫ or Šauška, are also not attested in them. The name Arip-Kumurwe, “Kumarbi gave (a child)”, is known from two sites, Mari and Shubat-Enlil. An example is also known from Hattusa, though due to the state of preservation of the text the full name cannot be restored.

=== Hittite reception ===
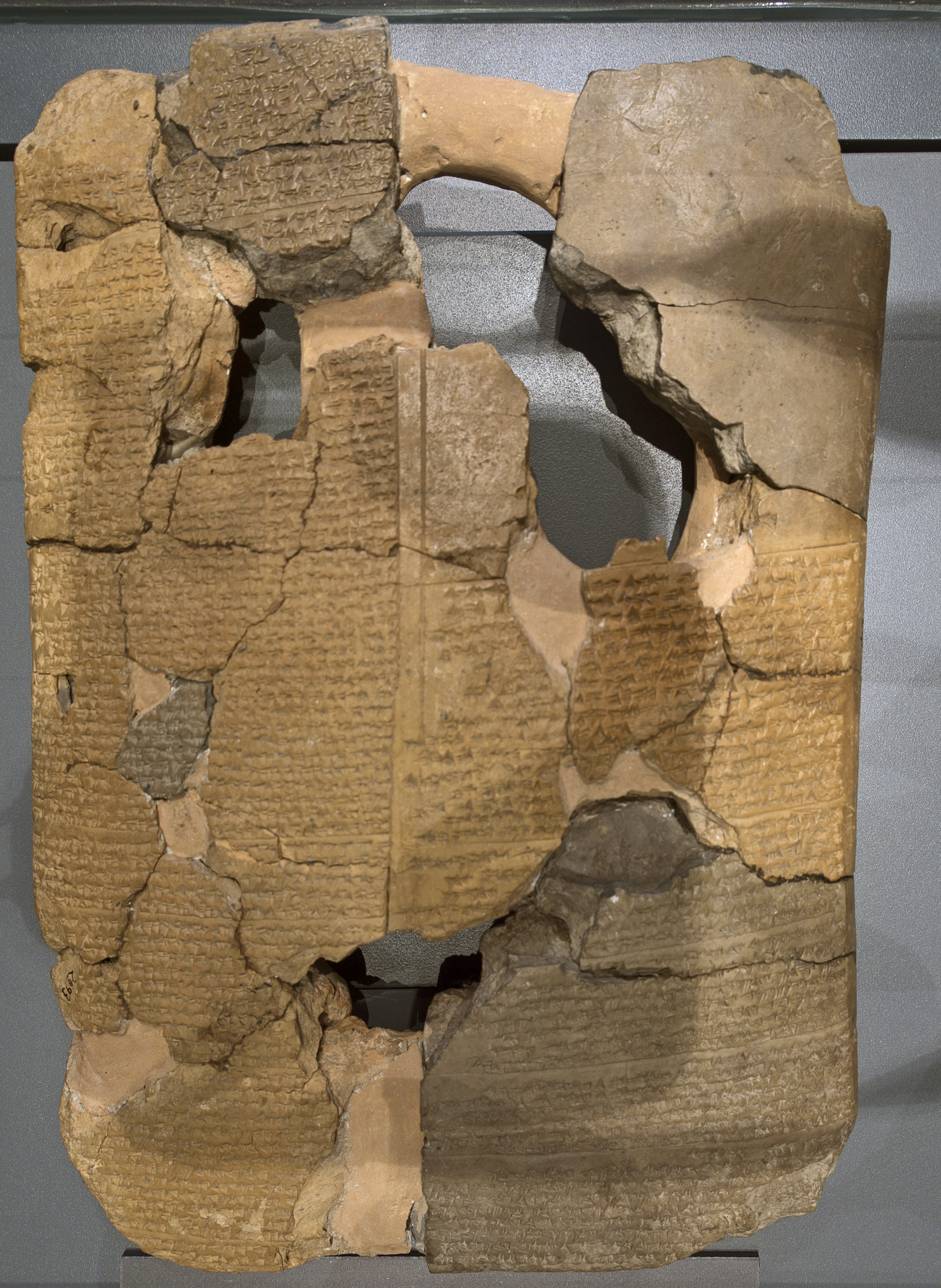
The Muwatalli II-Alaksandu treaty, which mentions Kumarbi among the divine witnesses. Troy Museum.

Kumarbi was among the Hurrian deities who also came to be worshiped in the Hittite Empire. Most of the ritual texts from Hattusa which mention him have a Hurrian background and likely originated in Kizzuwatna. In offering lists, he belonged to the circle of deities (kaluti) of Teshub. In the reliefs from the Yazılıkaya sanctuary, where the depicted deities seemingly follow the order of such lists, he is most likely depicted on relief assigned number 40 in the conventional numbering in modern literature. Typically in ritual texts in enumerations of deities he follows Teshub and Tašmišu and precedes Ea, Kušuḫ and Šimige. However, in a similar list dealing with the worship of Teshub in Šapinuwa he appears after Anu. During the reign of Tudḫaliya IV, he received offerings alongside other deities belonging to the kaluti of Teshub in the temple of Kataḫḫa in Ankuwa during the AN.TAḪ.ŠUM festival. In the Hurro-Hittite itkalzi rituals, Kumarbi appears alongside Shalash. She precedes him in instructions for the hišuwa festival. The ritual text KUB 45.28+ mentions Kumarbi alongside the “ancient gods” (Eltara, Nabira, Minki, Tuḫuši, Ammunki and Awannamu), Teshub, mountain gods and Ea.

In lists of divine witnesses in Hittite diplomatic texts Kumarbi is only attested twice, in the treaties between Muršili II and Manapa-Tarhunta, and between Muwatalli II and Alaksandu of Wilusa. In other similar texts a comparable entry in the list is occupied by a deity named Apantu instead. However, Alfonso Archi suggests that in treaties with Syrian rulers the pair Enlil and Ninlil might correspond to Kumarbi and Shalash. At the same time, he notes that the sumerogram ^{d}EN.LÍL was seemingly never used to designate him in offering lists.

=== Late attestations ===
In Taite, a Mitanni city conquered by Assyria during the reign of Adad-nirari I, Kumarbi apparently retained a degree of relevance well into Neo-Assyrian times alongside two other originally Hurrian deities, Nabarbi and Samnuha. All three of them are attested in a Tākultu text.

The Luwian deity Kumarma, known from sources from the tenth century BCE, is presumed to be a late form of Kumarbi. Attestations of this theonym are available exclusively from hieroglyphic Luwian inscriptions from south of the Taurus Mountains, which mention him in relation with prosperity. In three texts from Tell Ahmar (Masuwari) attributed to the local king Hamiyata he appears alongside “king Ea”, according to Ilya Yakubovich a calque of Hurrian Ea šarri. He is also mentioned alongside Tipariya, a wine god, in an inscription from Carchemish which states that the weather god Tarḫunz with established “the land of the good god and Tipariya”. A stele from Arsuz addresses them as “mother” (Note: The term used is specifically an otherwise unknown diminutive form of the Luwian word for mother, anati-ni, which Mark Weeden suggests translating as “mummy”.) and “father” respectively. This description has been described as an “unexpected reversal of sexes”, but Mark Weeden notes that it might echo the Hurrian tradition about the birth of Teshub, in the context of which Kumarbi could similarly be referred to as his mother. He states that whether this reflects a survival of a local belief connected to the worship of Teshub in Aleppo, possibly though not necessarily tied to Mitanni royal ideology, or a tradition preserved in Hattusa and later imported into northern Syria is unknown. Amir Gilan has voiced support for the former interpretation.

Following the proposal of Edith Porada, it is sometimes assumed that the golden bowl of Hasanlu might depict Kumarbi, as well as other deities who appear in myths focused on him, which according to Alfonso Archi would indicate that as a “pan-Hurrian” deity he might have continued to be worshiped in eastern areas until the beginning of the first millennium BCE.

== Mythology ==
Kumarbi played a central role in Hurrian mythology. Myths focused on him are known chiefly from the Bogazköy Archive, and most of them are preserved in Hittite translations. However, as noted by Gary Beckman, their themes, such as conflict over kingship in heaven, reflect Hurrian, rather than Hittite, theology. According to Alfonso Archi, they were transmitted in the beginning of the fourteenth century BCE, during a period of growing influence of Hurrian culture on the Hittites.

=== Kumarbi Cycle ===
The “Kumarbi Cycle” is a scholarly grouping of a number of myths focused on the eponymous god. It has been described as “[u]nquestionably the best-known belletristic work discovered in the Hittite archives”. The individual texts were referred to with the sumerogram SÌR, “song”, a designation also used for Hittite compositions about the exploits of Gilgamesh. The Hurrian word corresponding to this sign is unknown, while in Hittite it was most likely read as išḫamai-. Preserved incipits indicate that they might have been sung. However, it is not certain if they necessarily originated as oral compositions, even though the heavy reliance on direct speech might further support the possibility that the discovered versions were meant to be performed.

The core theme of myths grouped under the label of "Kumarbi Cycle" are Kumarbi’s attempts to dethrone Teshub. The individual texts frequently characterize him as cunning (ḫattant-), and describe him plotting new schemes meant to bring upon the defeat of the weather god. As noted by Daniel Schwemer, ancient authors introduced a sense of suspense to the narratives by having each of the plans appear to be successful in the short term. Typically they involve a new enemy set up by Kumarbi to battle Teshub. However, the adversaries are eventually defeated, though not necessarily destroyed. Harry Hoffner has noted that the myths appear to present the two main characters and their allies in contrasting ways: Kumarbi is aided by figures linked to the underworld, such as Alalu, the deified sea, Ullikummi or the Irširra deities, while Teshub by heavenly deities such as Šauška, Šimige, Kušuḫ, Aštabi or Ḫepat and her maidservant Takitu.

The five myths conventionally considered to be a part of the cycle are the Song of Kumarbi (CTH 344), the Song of LAMMA (CTH 343), the Song of Silver (CTH 364), the Song of Ḫedammu (CTH 348) and the Song of Ullikummi (CTH 345). Their arrangement used in the following sections reflects the most commonly accepted order. However, the overall number of texts which might have originally formed the cycle is not known. Anna Maria Polvani suggests that it is possible multiple cycles of myths involving Kumarbi existed, assumes the known narratives did not necessarily form a coherent whole. Alfonso Archi states that attempts at arranging them in a chronological order only reflect contemporary “hermeneutical needs”, though he agrees that the label “Kumarbi Cycle” should be retained in scholarship for practical reasons to refer to myths which deal with the conflict between Kumarbi and Teshub. Erik van Dongen does not regard Polvani’s proposal as necessarily incorrect, though he states due to the state of preservation of the individual myths, and the shared themes between them, separation into multiple cycles is presently impossible and continuing to refer to them as a singular cycle in scholarship remains preferable. However, he does suggest that it might be more correct to refer to it as a “Kingship in Heaven cycle” than Kumarbi Cycle. Carlo Corti, while he accepts the existence of a cycle of myths involving Kumarbi, has also questioned the label applied to them, and suggests that calling them the cycle of Teshub would more accurately reflect their contents. This objection is also supported by Piotr Taracha.

==== Song of Kumarbi (Song of Emergence) ====
The Song of Kumarbi is uniformly agreed to be beginning of the Kumarbi Cycle. The best known copy of the text is the tablet KUB 33.120, which is poorly preserved, with only around 125-150 lines out of original 350 surviving. Emmanuel Laroche identified tablet KUB 33.119 as a further section in 1950. Additional sections have been identified on KUB 48.97 + 1194/u. Further known fragments include KUB 36.31, KUB 36.1 and KBo 52.10. A short text written in Hurrian, KUB 47.56, is presumed to be a possible variant of the same myth due to a mention of Alalu, Anu and Kumarbi, though due to the still imperfect understanding of Hurrian its contents remain uncertain. The main tablet has been dated to the first decades of the fourteenth century, but the composition might be older. Amir Gilan has described it as “one of the finest and most sophisticated works of literature to survive from the Hittite world.”

The title Song of Kumarbi has originally been proposed by Hans Gustav Güterbock. However, the first translation of the text was published as The Kingship among the Gods. It has been variously referred to as Kingship in Heaven or Theogony as well. More recent publications use the title Song of Emergence. It was established based on new joins to the texts, including a colophon, originally identified in 2007. As noted by Carlo Corti, the text is labeled in it as the song of GÁ✕È.A, which based on the information provided by the multilingual edition of the lexical list Erimḫuš can be interpreted as a writing of the Hittite phrase para-kán pauwar, which makes it possible to translate the title literally as “song of departure”, and metaphorically as the “song of emergence” or “song of genesis”. The fragment also identifies a certain Ašḫapala as the scribe responsible for copying the text.

The myth begins with an invocation of primeval deities, who are invited to listen to the narrator’s song about the deeds of Kumarbi, and with an account the reigns of three “kings in heaven” are described, without the origin of any of them being mentioned. The first of the kings of the gods is Alalu, who after nine years is overthrown by his cupbearer Anu, who forces him to flee to the “Dark Earth”, the underworld. Anu is in turn overthrown by his own cupbearer Kumarbi, described as “scion of Alalu”, who fought him after first serving him for nine years. Some of the kaluti lists belonging to the cult of Teshub preserve an order of deities reflecting the succession described in this passage. The length of the reigns is most likely symbolic, and according to Gery Beckman in the light of the central themes of this work might be a reference to the nine months of human pregnancy. Kumarbi let Anu flee after defeating him, though only after biting off and swallowing his genitals. Anu then taunts him:

Do not rejoice over your belly, for I have placed a burden in your belly. First, I have impregnated you with the mighty Storm-god (Note: Represented by the sumerogram ^{d}IŠKUR (^{d}IM). It was read as Tarḫunna in the Hittite translation, but the deity meant was originally Teshub. The replacement has been described as “superficial”, and the narrative preserves details supporting identification of the protagonist with the latter god, such as a reference to the bulls Šeri and Ḫurri.). Second, I have impregnated you with the River Tigris, (Note: Alfonso Archi suggests that the reference to this river might indicate the myth takes place south or southwest of lake Van.) not to be borne. Third, I have impregnated you with the mighty Tašmišu. I have placed three frightful deities as a burden in your belly, and you will end up banging your head against the rocks of Mt. Tašša!

Kumarbi spits out some of Anu’s semen, which falls on the mountain Kanzura which becomes pregnant with Tašmišu instead, though this still leaves the remaining two children inside him, and he travels to Nippur to seek a solution. It is presumed that the reference to this city reflected the theological tradition known from the Syro-Hurrian milieu, according to which Kumarbi and its main god, Enlil, were regarded as analogous. He apparently discusses the best course of action with Anu, Ea and Teshub, in this passage designated by the epithet KA.ZAL. Following the weather god’s argument that the only safe way for him to leave Kumarbi’s body would be to split the skull of the latter, the fate goddesses perform this operation, and subsequently mend the head “like a garment” while apparently the river Tigris leaves through another, unspecified, route. Kumarbi is not fond of his newborn children, and demands to have Teshub (here referred to as NAM.ḪÉ, “abundance”) to be handed over to him so that he can devour or crush him. However, a stone is given to him as a substitute and he breaks his teeth trying to bite it.

It is assumed that the ultimate outcome of the myth, while not preserved, was most likely favorable for Teshub. However, he was not yet granted kingship over the gods, and in a surviving passage seemingly expresses displeasure, cursing the older deities.

==== Song of LAMMA ====
The Song of LAMMA, also known as the Song of KAL, is focused on a deity designated by the sumerogram LAMMA. It is considered improbable that a Mesopotamian lamma (lamassu) is meant, and Alfonso Archi suggests that the name is a logographic writing of Karḫuḫi. In the beginning of the narrative, LAMMA manages to defeat Teshub and Šauška. He is selected to act as the king of the gods by Kumarbi and Ea. He ignores the advice of Kubaba, who implores him to meet with the other gods. Ea and Kumarbi as a result eventually grow displeased with him . The former sends a messenger to the underworld to discuss how to depose LAMMA with Nara-Napšara, a pair of primeval deities, and in the end he is seemingly defeated and subsequently subjugated by Teshub.

Anna Maria Polvani notes that Song of LAMMA appears to indicate that Kumarbi was not necessarily always portrayed as seeking kingship for himself or his sons, as he also supports LAMMA. However, Harry Hoffner argues that it is not impossible that he was also regarded as a son of Kumarbi.

==== Song of Silver ====
The classification of the Song of Silver as a part of the cycle is not universally accepted. The text does not explicitly refer to kingship among the gods or to the defeat of the eponymous figure, Silver, (Note: The name is typically translated into English.) and the assumptions that it structurally resembled other myths belonging to the Kumarbi Cycle, while considered plausible, is only conjectural.

In the beginning, the narrator praises Silver, crediting “wise men” as the source of information about him. Daniel Schwemer interprets him as the personification of the metal he represented. He is described as a son of a mortal woman and a god described as the “father of Urkesh”, presumed to be Kumarbi. Silver’s name is written without the so-called divine determinative, and according to Alfonso Archi the myth most likely reflects the belief that a couple consisting of a deity and a mortal would have mortal offspring.

Other boys mock Silver because he was raised without a father. However, he is not actually an orphan, as his father has merely abandoned him. His mother eventually fearfully reveals to him that his father is Kumarbi, that his siblings are Teshub and Šauška, and that he should head to Urkesh, but when he reaches this city, he learns that he is gone from his house, and instead wanders the mountains. The rest of the myth is poorly preserved, but according to Harry Hoffner’s restoration Silver confronts the heavenly gods, bringing the sun and the moon down from heaven temporarily. Despite initial success he was presumably subsequently defeated.

==== Song of Ḫedammu ====
In the Song of Ḫedammu, Kumarbi fathers a new opponent meant to defeat Teshub, a voracious sea monster. He is conceived after Kumarbi meets with the deified sea (Kiaše) and decides to have a child with his daughter Šertapšuruḫi. Their offspring is described as a tarpanalli (“substitute”, “rival”) of Teshub.

Apparently the initial emergence of Ḫedammu leads to a destructive confrontation between Teshub’s allies and Kumarbi which puts mankind into danger, which prompts Ea to rebuke both factions in the divine assembly:

(...) Ea began to say: “Why are you destroying mankind? They will not give sacrifices to the gods. They will not burn cedar and incense to you. If you destroy mankind, they will no longer worship the gods. No one will offer bread or libations to you any longer. Even Teššub, Kummiya’s heroic king, will himself work the plow. (...) Ea, King of Wisdom, said to Kumarbi: “Why are you, o Kumarbi, seeking to harm mankind? Does not the mortal take a grain heap and do they not promptly offer it to you, Kumarbi? Does he make offering to you alone, Kumarbi, Father of the Gods, joyfully in the midst of the temple? (...)

Anna Maria Polvani notes that he apparently presents Kumarbi and Teshub as equals. It has also been noted that this scene seemingly marks the beginning of Ea’s estrangement from Kumarbi, which eventually leads to him supporting Teshub against him in the Song of Ullikummi. Kumarbi is displeased about being rebuked in front of other gods, and, possibly calling himself the son of Alalu, mentions the deity Ammezzadu in an unknown context while complaining about Ea’s words. He subsequently orders his servant Mukišānu to take a secret subterranean route to summon the sea god for a meeting during which they will discuss their plans. The remaining surviving fragments outline Šauška’s preparation for a second confrontation with Ḫedammu, which presumably culminates in his defeat, described in the now lost ending.

==== Song of Ullikummi ====
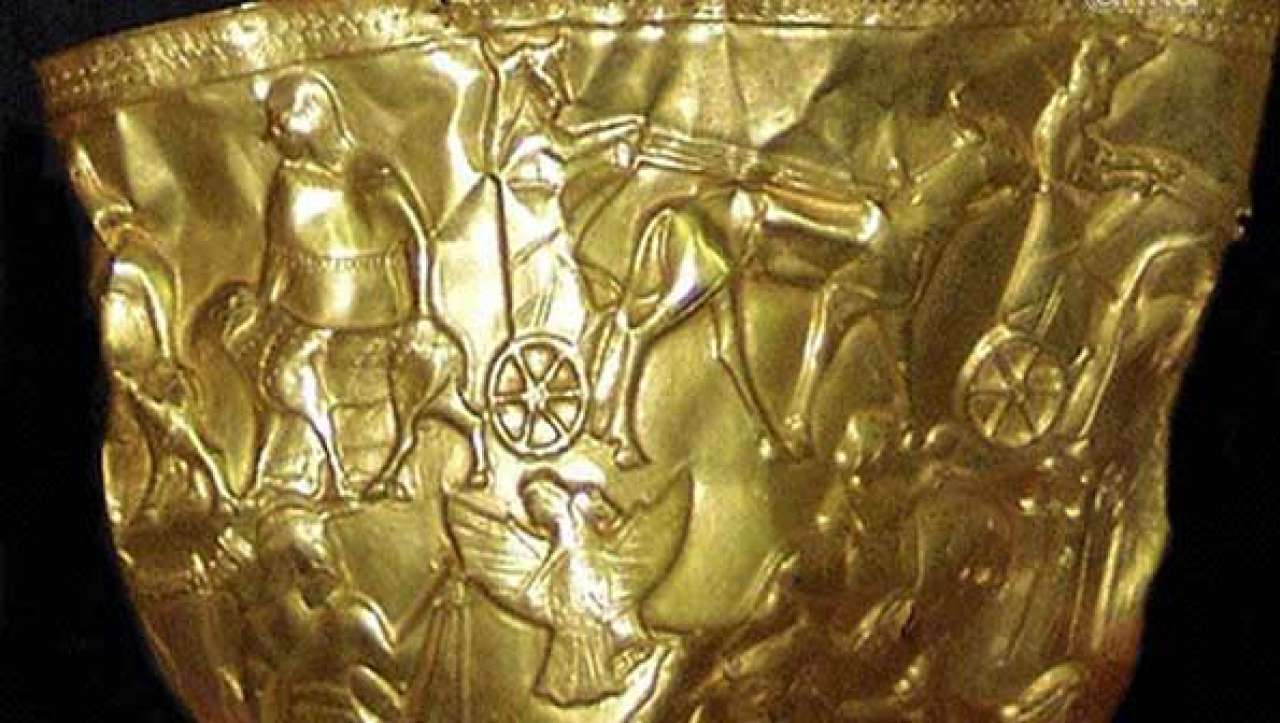
A possible representation of scenes from the Song of Ullikummi on the golden bowl of Hasanlu

The Song of Ullikummi is focused on Kumarbi’s effort to destroy Teshub with the help of Ullikummi, a stone giant whose name means “Destroy Kumme!”, Kumme being the city of Teshub. It has been pointed out that this explicit goal adds a personal dimension to the conflict. Both Hittite and Hurrian versions exist, though they are not direct translations of each other, which might indicate the myth was transmitted orally. Most likely its compilers were familiar with the Song of Ḫedammu. In both myths, the challengers are addressed as “substitutes” (tarpanalli). Furthermore, both portray Kumarbi and the sea god as allies, and in both Šauška (^{d}IŠTAR) attempts to seduce the eponymous monsters to subdue them.

In the beginning of the composition, Kumarbi devises a new plan and travels from Urkesh to a cold spring, where he spots an enormous stone which he deems to be a suitable candidate to impregnate to create a new opponent for Teshub. After a lacuna, the sea sends his messenger, Impaluri, to ask Kumarbi why he is angry with him, and to invite him for a feast, which he subsequently attends alongside his messenger Mukišānu. The next surviving passage, preceded by another lacuna, describes the birth of Kumarbi’s new son. The child is presented to him by the fate goddesses, and he proclaims that his name will be Ullikummi. This scene might be depicted on the golden bowl of Hasanlu. Kumarbi states that Ullikummi will be able to destroy Teshub in the future, but for the time being needs to be hidden to have time to grow away from the sight of the weather god and his allies, and instructs Impaluri to summon the Irširra deities. He entrusts the Irširra with taking him to the underworld and placing him on the shoulders of Upelluri, an Atlas-like being. They first take it to Enlil, who instantly recognizes him as a product of Kumarbi’s “evil plot” and presumes he is supposed to supplant Teshub. Subsequently Ullikummi is placed on the shoulder of Upelluri, as ordered by Kumarbi. Teshub and his allies later attempt to battle the fully grown Ullikummi, but they fail to defeat him and he eventually manages to block the access to the temple of Teshub's wife Ḫepat, trapping her inside. Teshub eventually secures the help of Ea at Tašmišu’s suggestion. Ea subsequently consults Enlil, Upelluri and the "primordial gods" residing in the underworld and recovers a primordial tool which was used to separate earth from heaven long ago, with which he plans to separate Ullikummi from Upelluri. Afterwards Teshub once again battles the giant. Presumably the composition ended with the weather god’s victory.

==== Possibly related texts ====
It is commonly assumed that fragmentary myth preserved on the tablet KBo 22.87 belongs to the Kumarbi Cycle. It describes the reign of a deity named Eltara, one of the “ancient gods” known from presumably related myths. His relation to Kumarbi remains unclear. It has been suggested that the text might deal with the final victory of Teshub over his adversaries, though it has also been interpreted as an example of a narrative focused on a “minor kingship” as Eltara does not appear in sequences of “kings in heaven” in other sources, which list Alalu, Anu and Kumarbi.

The Song of the Sea (CTH 785; preserved on tablets KBo 8.86 and KUB 44.7) might represent a further section of the Kumarbi Cycle. It most likely describes a battle between Teshub and the deified sea, though due to imperfect understanding of Hurrian little is known about the details of its plot. Kumarbi is mentioned in a damaged passage near the end of tablet KUB 44.7, though it is only possible to establish that he has a speaking role. It has also been argued that the Song of the Sea might have influenced the portrayal the eponymous being his ally in the Song of Ḫedammu and Song of Ullikummi. Ian Rutherford suggests that Song of the Sea might belong before the Song of Ḫedammu in the commonly accepted sequence of Kumarbi myths, possibly forming the first half of the same narrative, and that the sea offered Kumarbi his daughter in the aftermath of his defeat at the hands of Teshub, though he notes that an alternate proposal is to place it before the Song of LAMMA, in which case it would instead document the start of Teshub’s rise to power. Daniel Schwemer in a more recent study argues that a confrontation between Teshub and the sea might have been the final section of the Kumarbi Cycle, in the aftermath of which his kingship was firmly established.

A possible additional fragment of Song of the Sea is preserved on the tablet KBo 26.105, and relays how Kumarbi urges other deities to pay tribute to the eponymous deity after Teshub fails to defeat him, which results in a flood apparently reaching even the sun and the moon. The text breaks off after. Due to a lack of deities willing to volunteer, Šauška is selected to bring the tribute. Kumarbi is seemingly described positively in this case and acts as the counselor of the gods, similarly to how Ea does in other myths. This portrayal is considered unusual, though according to Noga Ayali-Darshan attempts to harmonize it with the more hostile role he plays in other myths, while present in scholarship, are not necessary. She argues that the myth was an adaptation of an otherwise unknown Syrian composition, and Kumarbi was placed in a positive role which originally belonged to Dagan instead, despite the difference between their respective characters.

Alfonso Archi counts the myth Ea and the Beast (KUB 36.32 and KUB 36.55) among these belonging to the Kumarbi Cycle. The similarities include references to deities being placed inside someone, presumably Kumarbi, details of the accounts of the births of Aranzaḫ and Teshub, and the mention of impregnation by spittle. However, the form of the text differs, as the events are presented as a prophecy given by the eponymous beast (suppalanza) to the god Ea. It might describe the conflict between Kumarbi and Teshub and their respective allies. Ian Rutherford proposes that the events of Ea and the Beast might be placed in the cycle either directly before the Song of Emergence, with Ea learning about the events involving Kumarbi and Teshub in advance, or after it with the beast in part recounting what has already happened. He also notes that while the characterization of Ea differs, as he is apparently portrayed as ignorant despite his usual role as an epitome of wisdom, it is possible that the author intended a scene in which the beast rhetorically asks him “Don’t you know?” to parallel questions Ea himself asks Enlil and the giant Upelluri in the Song of Ullikummi. He suggests that this might further support classifying the text as part of the Kumarbi Cycle, as Ea learning about the outcome of the conflict between Kumarbi and Teshub could explain why his attitude towards the latter seemingly changes for the better through the individual myths.

Song of Oil (Song of Ḫašarri) has been classified as a part of the Kumarbi Cycle by Ilya Yakubovich, Erik van Dongen and a number of other authors, though this proposal has been evaluated as implausible by Meindert Dijkstra. In this composition, which is known from a number of fragments in Hurrian, Kumarbi apparently advises Šauška to seek the help of Ea when she faces troubles related to the development of the eponymous being, apparently a personification of olive oil or an olive tree. However, most of his speech is not preserved.

It has also been proposed that the fragment KUB 22.118 belongs to the Kumarbi Cycle. It alludes to intercourse between Kumarbi and the personified mountain Wāšitta. The interpretation of two frequently words frequently repeated in it, tuḫḫima- and tuḫḫae-, is a matter of dispute, and the early assumption of Johannes Friedrich, who assumed they can be translated as “to have labor pains, to begin to have contractions” is no longer accepted as this term also occurs in other texts in context which makes a link to pregnancy implausible. Emmanuel Laroche instead suggested interpreting them as terms referring to gasping and suffocation, which has been adopted by a number of dictionaries of Hittite, such as Hethitisches Handwörterbuch and Chicago Hittite Dictionary. However, this translation did not find universal support either. Alwin Kloekhorst proposes interpreting both terms as related to the stem tuḫḫ-, which occurs in words related to smoke. On this basis he suggests that Wāšitta was a personified volcano, a “smoking mountain”, and that rest of the narrative, which is now lost, described her giving birth to another new opponent of Teshub through an eruption.

=== Other myths ===
A reference to Kumarbi has been identified in a fragment of the Hurrian version of the myth of Kešši, though it is not known what role he played in this narrative.

A Hittite version of Atrahasis (KUB 8.63 + KBo 53.5), presumably adapted from Hurrian, casts Kumarbi in the role assigned to Enlil in the Akkadian original. A man named Hamsha (Note: Akkadian: “fifty”, as pointed out by Gary Beckman an epithet of Enlil. The name is written without the divine determinative. The character is not present in the Mesopotamian original.) informs his son, the eponymous protagonist, about actions this god plans to take, but their description is not preserved. Kumarbi is also mentioned in a historiola focused on the flood hero in a text presumed to be a healing ritual of “Hurro-Luwian” background, in the past sometimes classified as a fragment of a Gilgamesh myth instead. It is known from two tablets, KUB 8.62 and Bo 5700.

=== Comparative scholarship ===
Piotr Taracha has suggested that victory of Teshub over Kumarbi and his allies in myths conventionally classified as parts of the Kumarbi Cycle might constitute an example of the chaoskampf motif. Volkert Haas compared Kumarbi’s role as an antagonist seeking to overthrow the rule of another deity to those played by Mesopotamian Enmesharra and Ugaritic Mot in myths involving them, and has suggested that all of these narratives might symbolically represent times of hunger or other difficulties.

Christopher Metcalf suggests that the account of Kumarbi’s temporary role as a cupbearer might be derived from Mesopotamian tradition. He compares it to the legends about the rise of Sargon of Akkad to power, such as the Sumerian Sargon Legend or the relevant section of the Weidner Chronicle, in which he similarly overthrows the fictional king Ur-Zababa of Kish after serving as his cupbearer or a time.

Parallels between Kumarbi’s ascent to kingship and the Mesopotamian myth Theogony of Dunnu have been noted by Wilfred G. Lambert. It has been pointed out that at one point in the latter myth kingship is seized by an unnamed “servant of heaven” (seḫer ^{d}ḫamorni), in a passage which, while written in Akkadian, uses a Hurrian loanword to refer to heaven. Lambert also stated that an expository text referring to “"the day when Anu bound the king, the day when king Marduk bound Anu" might be interpreted as a Babylonian counterpart of the succession of kings of the gods in the myths focused on Kumarbi, though he also noted that it most likely reflects a tradition which was well known among contemporaries of the author but was not directly preserved.

Comparisons have been made between the Kumarbi Cycle and the Ugaritic Baal Cycle, which also deals with a struggle for kingship among the gods. It has been argued that parallels exist between the portrayals of the relations between Kumarbi, Kiaše and Teshub with these between El, Yam and Baal, but Daniel Schwemer points out that they are not identical, as Kumarbi actively instigates the conflict while El is a passive figure. Noga Ayali-Darshan additionally suggests that descriptions of Baal as “son of Dagan” might have resulted from adapting the Hurrian tradition about both Kumarbi and Anu being fathers of Teshub, with El playing the role of Kumarbi as Baal’s enemy and Dagan that of his ally. However, Mark S. Smith notes that El is not directly opposed to Baal, and eventually even mourns his death (KTU 1.5 VI). He nonetheless accepts that the scene of El naming Yam, who acts as Baal’s rival, can be compared with Kumarbi naming Ullikummi in the Song of Ullikummi. He also notes both narratives take place on Mount Saphon.

Similarities have been pointed out between the Song of the Sea and the ancient Egyptian Astarte Papyrus. They include a description of the sea covering the earth, a deity associated with grain (respectively Kumarbi and Renenutet) imploring other gods to pay tribute, and a goddess closely associated with a weather god (respectively Šauška and Astarte) being selected to bring it. A single passage describing Astarte undressing additionally shows similarity to scenes from the myths of Ḫedammu and Ullikummi involving Šauška. The role assigned to Renenutet is regarded as unusual, as she was a minor deity in ancient Egyptian religion, in contrast with Kumarbi in Hurrian religion. Since a direct transmission from a Hurrian source is considered implausible, Noga Ayali-Darshan suggests that both myths were transmitted to the respective cultures from the Levant. Daniel Schwemer similarly assumes that both of them were adaptations of the same hypothetical narrative originating in northern Syria.

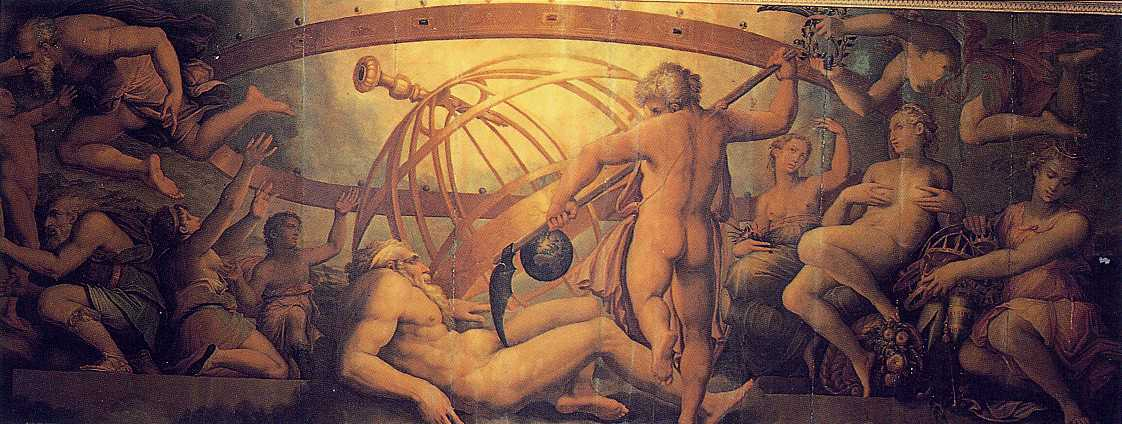
A 16th century painting by Giorgio Vasari and Cristoforo Gherardi showing the castration of Ouranos, a Greek myth possibly influenced by the Kumarbi Cycle.

As early as in the 1940s, arguments have been made that the Kumarbi Cycle contains mythologems which can be considered forerunners of these found in Hesiod's Theogony. Comparisons have been made between the roles of Kumarbi and Kronos in particular, and more broadly between the succession of “kings in heaven” and the reigns of Ouranos, Kronos and Zeus. The existence of a relation between the two texts is widely accepted today. The castration of a sky god, and possibly also the swallowing of a rock in place of a deity, are presumed to be two elements of the myth of Kumarbi adopted by Greeks. Gary Beckman has expressed skepticism over whether Greeks necessarily received all of the shared elements of the two myths directly from Kumarbi myths, and suggested they might have belonged to a Mediterranean cultural milieu. At the same time, he referred to the birth of Teshub from Kumarbi’s split skull as a “template” for the myth of the birth of Athena from the head of Zeus. This proposal is also regarded as plausible by Ian Rutherford. Differences between the Kumarbi Cycle and theogony have also been pointed out: if the common interpretation that Alalu and Kumarbi are not related to Anu is accepted, kingship is not passed from father to son in the older myth. Furthermore, Kumarbi does not use a weapon to castrate Anu, but rather his teeth. Carolina López-Ruiz accepts that despite the differences Theogony represents Greek reception of the Kumarbi Cycle, but she notes that a closer parallel can be found in an Orphic theogony from the Derveni papyrus, where Zeus castrates Ouranos, swallows his genitals and thus becomes impregnated with the cosmos, which according to her better reflects the succession from Anu to Kumarbi. She notes Kumarbi and Kronos in theory were figures more similar to each other, and assumes the motif was reinterpreted to suit Zeus instead because the author of this text wanted to emphasize his creative powers. Further similar Orphic myths include an account of castration of Kronos by Zeus and a passage in the Orphic Rhapsodies where the latter swallows Phanes, a figure in this context described as his ancestor.

As an extension of discussion of the possible influence of the Kumarbi Cycle and Theogony, additional parallels have been pointed out between both of these works and the accounts of the reigns of Elyon, Ouranos and El in the writings of Philo of Byblos. Hans Gustav Güterbock has proposed that Philo might have specifically relied on a source forming an intermediate stage between the Kumarbi Cycle and Theogony. However, more recent research stresses that the possibility of influence from early sources on his writing needs to be balanced with their historical context. Albert I. Baumgarten has criticized Güterbock’s position, and argued that none of the myths involved can be described as “intermediary” between others. He also pointed out that despite the frequent comparisons made in scholarship, Philo’s Phoenician History lacks a number of elements present in the Kumarbi Cycle: Demarous does not challenge the reign of Kronos in the way Teshub challenges Kumarbi, and no battles against monsters occur. He concluded that the Kumarbi Cycle, Theogony and Phoenician History merely represent different takes on a common mythological motif. More recently, it has proposed that the episode in Phoenician History in which Ouranos tasks Dagon (Dagan) with raising Damerous, a son he had with a concubine, might constitute a non-violent adaptation of the account of Teshub’s origin as a son of both Anu and Kumarbi in the Kumarbi Cycle, though Dagon does not supplant Ouranos as a ruler.

Ian Rutherford has proposed that an anonymous scholion stating that Kronos was the father of Typhon, in this context placed in Cilicia, might echo a tradition involving Kumarbi, though he remarks the similarity between the Greek monster and Ullikummi or Ḫedammu is vague, and the respective Greek and Anatolian narratives do not parallel each other.
