= Shalash =

Syrian goddess

- Wife of Dagan or Kumarbi
- Major cult center: Tuttul, Bitin

Genealogy
- Consort: Dagan; Wada'nu(m); Kumarbi
- Children: Hadad, possibly Hebat

Equivalents
- Mesopotamian: Ninlil

Shalash (also romanized Šalaš) was a Syrian goddess best known as the wife of Dagan, the head of the pantheon of the middle Euphrates area. She was already worshiped in Ebla and Tuttul in the third millennium BCE, and later her cult is attested in Mari as well. She was also introduced to the Mesopotamian and Hurrian pantheons.

Both in ancient Mesopotamian texts and in modern scholarships a long-standing issue is the differentiation between Shalash and the similarly named Shala, wife of the weather god Ishkur/Adad in Mesopotamia.

== Name ==
The etymology of the name Shalash is unknown. Based on the attestations in the Ebla texts, theories of Hurrian origin can be rejected. However, as noted by Alfonso Archi, there is no plausible Semitic etymology either, similar as in the case of other Syrian deities like Kubaba or Aštabi. Lluis Feliu proposes that it might have originated in an unknown substrate language.

The spellings ^{d}sa-a-ša, ^{d}sa-a-sa and ^{d}ša-la-ša are attested in documents from Ebla.

In Old Babylonian Mari the name was commonly written logographically as ^{d}NIN.HUR.SAG.GA. It is also possible that texts from the same city mentioning Ninlil and Ninkugi refer to Shalash.

In Yazılıkaya, the name is written in hieroglyphs as (DEUS)sa-lu-sa. The spelling Shalush is also known from Hurrian texts.

In Emar the name of Dagan's wife was written as ^{d}NIN.KUR, which is presumed to be an extension of the customary logographic writing of his own name, ^{d}KUR. It has been proposed that this deity can be identified with Shalash, and that the western scribes treated ^{d}NIN.KUR as a synonym of ^{d}NIN.HUR.SAG.GA based on similar meanings of the names. A goddess named Ninkur is also known from Mesopotamian god lists, though there she is instead one of the ancestors of Enlil.

The god list An = Anum lists the Sumerian names Ninkusi ("lady of gold"), Ninudishara ("mistress who amazes the world") and Ninsuhzagina ("Lady, diadem of lapis lazuli") as synonymous with Shalash.

== Association with other deities ==
Shalash was the wife of Dagan, and together they stood at the head of the pantheon of the middle Euphrates area in ancient Syria. No known text specifies if she was believed to have any ancestors. It is assumed that Adad was viewed as her son in Mari. Lluis Felieu additionally proposes that Hebat, the goddess of Halab (Aleppo) was a daughter of Shalash and Dagan.

In the texts from Ebla, Shalash is also associated with Wada'an(u), a god distinct from Dagan, worshiped in Gar(r)amu rather than Tuttul. Alfonso Archi proposes that they were regarded as consorts. It is assumed that his name had origin in a Semitic language. Unlike Dagan, Wada'an is not attested in any later sources.

In Hurrian tradition, Shalash was regarded as the wife of Kumarbi due to the syncretism between him and Dagan.

The Mesopotamian god list An = Anum equates Shala with Ninlil, and her husband with Enlil.

=== Shalash and Shala ===
In modern scholarship, Shalash is sometimes confused with Shala, a Mesopotamian goddess regarded as the wife of Adad. According to Daniel Schwemer, while a degree of confusion between the two goddesses is also present in some ancient sources, it is largely limited to scholarly Mesopotamian texts, and no older than the fourteenth century BCE. According to Lluis Feliu, most evidence for it comes from the first millennium BCE.

In the god list An = Anum, Shalash is listed as one of the alternate names of Shala. However, it also separately equates Shalash (but not Shala) with Ninlil. In a late explanatory text, Ninkusi/Shalash is addressed as "Shala of the western steppe." In a single copy of a Maqlû ritual from Assur, Shala occurs in place of Shalash, present in other known copies of the same text.

Lluis Felieu rejects the possibility that the two were originally the same, and especially that the confusion between them was caused by Dagan being a weather god himself and thus analogous to Adad. He also notes that Shala is well attested in art as a goddess associated with the weather, while the character of Shalash, based on parallels with the wives of heads of other pantheons of ancient Near East (for example Ninlil, wife of Enlil and Athirat, wife of El), would be unlikely to resemble that of the wife of the Mesopotamian weather god. Additionally, the spelling of the name of the goddess paired with Adad in devotional inscriptions is consistent between various time periods and languages, and never ends with a sibilant.

There is very little evidence for confusion of the two goddesses in Hurrian and Hittite sources. Daniel Schwemer considers a treaty of king Shattiwaza to be one example. Lluis Felieu proposes that for Hurrians and Hittites the source of confusion might have been the fact the final -š in the name of Shalash name could be interpreted as a case ending in their languages, but he also remarks that the only possible instances might also represent simple scribal mistakes.

== Worship ==
The earliest attestations of Shalash come from Ebla from the third millennium BCE. There is no indication she was commonly worshiped in that period, however. She was associated with the god Wada'an(u) worshiped in Gar(r)amu, a city in the Eblaite territory. In the documents of the royal vizier Ibrium there is also evidence for an association between ^{d}sa-a-ša (Shalash) and ^{D}BE du-du-lu_{ki}, "lord of Tuttul," a title of Dagan. A statue of Shalash was apparently an object of cult in Tuttul.

In later periods the cult of Shalash is well attested in Tuttul, and Alfonso Archi goes as far as proposing that the view that she was the wife of Dagan originated in this city. However, there is presently no evidence that she was worshiped in the other cult center of her husband, Terqa.

In Halab Shalash was worshiped alongside Dagan and Hebat in the pagrā'um ritual, part of a mourning ceremony.

Both the worship of Shalash and her association with Dagan are well attested in Old Babylonian Mari. In earlier periods she already had a temple in this city, at one point rebuilt by Nûr-Mêr. Kings closely linked to the worship of Shalash (^{d}NIN.HUR.SAG.GA) and Dagan include Yaggid-Lim, Yahdun-Lim and Zimri-Lim. Shalash was also worshiped by Hurrians living in the city. She appears in a number of theophoric names both from Mari itself and from the nearby Chagar Bazar, for example Shalash-tappi ("Shalash is my partner") and Shalash-turiya ("Shalash" is my refuge).

In Mesopotamia Shalash appears with Dagan on seals from the Isin-Larsa period.

In Hurrian sources she is listed in kaluti (offering lists) of the circle of Hebat, in some documents immediately after this goddess herself, in others between Aya and Adamma. She is also known from the kaluti of Shaushka. While in the former she appears with Kumarbi, he is absent from the latter. As early as in the Old Babylonian period Hurrians referred to Shalash as "Pidenhi." This epithet was derived from Piden (also spelled Bitin), a settlement mentioned in the texts from Alalakh, which was a cult center of this goddess.

On the reliefs from the Yazılıkaya sanctuary, Shalash is represented between Nabarbi and Damkina (figure number 52).

== Bibliography ==
- Archi, Alfonso (2013). "The West Hurrian Pantheon and Its Background". In Collins, B. J.; Michalowski, P. (eds.). Beyond Hatti: a tribute to Gary Beckman. Atlanta: Lockwood Press. ISBN 978-1-937040-11-6. OCLC 882106763.
- Archi, Alfonso (2015). Ebla and Its Archives. DE GRUYTER. doi:10.1515/9781614517887. ISBN 978-1-61451-716-0.
- Feliu, Lluís (2003). The god Dagan in Bronze Age Syria. Leiden Boston, MA: Brill. ISBN 90-04-13158-2. OCLC 52107444.
- Feliu, Lluís (2007). "Two brides for two gods. The case of Šala and Šalaš". He unfurrowed his brow and laughed. Münster: Ugarit-Verlag. ISBN 978-3-934628-32-8. OCLC 191759910.
- Schwemer, Daniel (2001). Die Wettergottgestalten Mesopotamiens und Nordsyriens im Zeitalter der Keilschriftkulturen: Materialien und Studien nach den schriftlichen Quellen (in German). Wiesbaden: Harrassowitz. ISBN 978-3-447-04456-1. OCLC 48145544.
- Schwemer, Daniel (2007). "The Storm-Gods of the Ancient Near East: Summary, Synthesis, Recent Studies Part I" (PDF). Journal of Ancient Near Eastern Religions. 7 (2). Brill: 121–168. doi:10.1163/156921207783876404. ISSN 1569-2116.
- Schwemer, Daniel (2008), "Šāla A. Philologisch", Reallexikon der Assyriologie (in German)
- Schwemer, Daniel (2008a), "Šāluš, Šālaš", Reallexikon der Assyriologie (in German)
