= Kumme =

Ancient city in Iraq or Turkey

Kumme (Akkadian Kummu or Kummum, Hittite Kummiya) was a Hurrian city, known from textual sources from both second and first millennium BCE. Its precise location is unknown, but it is mentioned in cuneiform texts from multiple other sites. It might have been located close to modern Zakho or Beytüşşebap. From the Old Babylonian period until Neo-Assyrian times it served as a religious center of transregional significance due to its association with the Hurrian weather god, Teshub. Its religious role is first mentioned in texts from Mari, and later recurs in Hurrian and Hittite sources. In the Neo-Assyrian period, it was apparently the center of a small independent buffer state on Assyrian borders. Its ultimate fate remains unknown, as from the reign of Sennacherib onward it is no longer mentioned in any texts.

== Name ==
As argued by Gernot Wilhelm, the toponym Kumme has a plausible Hurrian etymology, and can be interpreted as a combination of the root kum-, which according to him refers to building activity, and the suffix -me, well attested in other Hurrian words. This explanation is also accepted by Daniel Schwemer and Volkert Haas, who suggests meanings “to build” or “to pile up” for kum-. The same root is presumed to form the basis of the reconstructed toponym *Kumar, from which the theonym Kumarbi was likely derived. It is also attested in the word kumdi, “tower”, and in personal names in the texts from Nuzi. An alternate proposal is to link it with the Akkadian term kummu, “cella” or “sanctuary”.

The name of Kumme is also attested in Akkadian texts as Kummu or Kummum and in Hittite ones as Kummiya. An additional Hittite form might be Kumma, though it is possible an unrelated city named Kumma existed in the proximity of Ḫurma in southern Anatolia. Karen Radner additionally lists Qumenu as an Urartian form of the name. However, according to Schwemer, while this view is commonly accepted in scholarship, it is doubtful if these two names refer to the same city.

Kumme is to be distinguished from Kummanni (classical Comana), a city in the north of Kizzuwatna, though the latter toponym might also be derived from the root kum-. It should also not be confused with Qumānu, a kingdom which was located in the plains around modern Alqosh.

== Proposed location ==
The precise location of Kumme is uncertain. Based on sources from Tell Shemshara and Tell al-Rimah dated to the eighteenth century BCE, including letters and an account of wine rations prepared for a man from Kumme, possibly a guide, and a Gutian general, the city was a stop on a route leading from mountainous areas east of the Tigris to Jezirah, at least if the Nineveh area was to be avoided. Volkert Haas concluded it was located on the modern border between Turkey and Iraq. Daniel Schwemer suggests it is to be found in the proximity of modern Zakho. This possibility is also accepted by Steven W. Holloway. However, it has been criticized by Karen Radner, who argues that based on letters of Sargon II it can be assumed it was located in a more mountainous area and closer to Urartu, which according to her might indicate it is to be found further upstream on the Lesser Khabur, in the proximity of modern Beytüşşebap.

== History ==
=== Middle Bronze Age ===
First references to Kumme occur in texts from Old Babylonian Mari. Due to the possible etymology of its name, it is assumed that it was a Hurrian city from the beginning of its history. In a treaty between Zimri-Lim and a king of Kurdā, the weather god of Kumme (^{d}IŠKUR be-el ku-um-mi_{ki}) is invoked among the divine witnesses, separately from the weather god of Aleppo. The same king at one point offered a vase to this deity. The city is also mentioned in a Hurrian incantation from Mari, which directly refers to its main god with the name Teshub instead of using a logogram. Various textual sources indicate that Kumme was regarded as the main cult center of this god, and that as a result it was considered a religious site of “transregional significance” by the inhabitants of the Ancient Near East. A temple dedicated to him existed there. However, despite its religious importance, direct references to Kumme are relatively uncommon outside of literary texts dealing with its main deity.

=== Late Bronze Age ===
Kumme was recognized as a major religious site by both Hurrians and Hittites through the second half of the second millennium BCE. Hurrian myths portray Kumme as the residence of Teshub, while one of his enemies bears the name Ullikummi, “Destroy Kumme!”. The tale of Appu indicates that it was conventionally associated with him in a similar manner as Nineveh was with Šauška, Sippar with Shamash or Babylon with Marduk. This association is also mentioned in a fragment of a Hurrian adaptation of the Epic of Gilgamesh. Other deities worshiped in Kumme included Kumarbi, as indicated by an Ugaritic text referring to him as “Kumarbi Urkini Kummeni” (kmrb urgnkmn) and the “lady of Kumme”, according to Volkert Haas to be identified as Šauška. While Hurrian myths also mention a temple of Ḫepat located in Kumme, it is not certain if they reflect historical reality.

As already attested in the Old Babylonian period, Kumme could also be used as a theophoric element in Hurrian names. Examples include Paiš-Kumme (“Kumme may uplift”) from Nuzi, Kummen-ewri (“Kumme is the lord”) from Tikunani, Kummen-adal (“Kumme is strong”) from Mari and Ari-Kumme (“Kumme gave” or “Give, Kumme”) from a Middle Assyrian text. According to Thomas Richter, such names reflect the perception of the city itself as a numen. Daniel Schwemer assumes that the toponym served as a stand-in for the name of Teshub in this context. A single Assyrian name alluding to Kumme is also known, Bēl-Kumme-ilā’ī.

=== Iron Age ===
==== Neo-Assyrian period ====
Later references to Kumme come from the Neo-Assyrian period. It was the center of one of the small kingdoms which formed a buffer zone between Assyria and Urartu, alongside nearby Shubria, Musasir and Ukku. Both linguistically and culturally, it retained its Hurrian character. It is possible that it retained independence from more powerful neighbors due to its religious significance.

Adad-nirari II (reigned 911-891 BCE) visited Kumme in 895 BCE during a military campaign against Habhu, apparently a polity hostile to it, and made a sacrifice to the weather god, calling him his “lord”. He referred to him with the Mesopotamian name Adad, though according to Daniel Schwemer this should only be considered an Assyrian interpretation of his identity. While there is no indication that Assyrian kings made offerings to the weather god of Kumme after the ninth century BCE, he is referenced in a later source, the so-called Götteraddressbuch, which records deities worshiped in Assur and a number of other major Assyrian cities. Relations between Assyria and Kumme remained positive during the reign of Ashurnasirpal II (883-859 BCE), and some of its inhabitants might have fled to Assyria due to Urartian conquests of king Minua (reigned 810-785 BCE), who apparently turned the city into one of his fortresses. Multiple references to Kumme are also present in letters from the reign of Sargon II, which indicate that it was once again an independent small kingdom at this point in time. One of these documents states that its king at the time bore the name Ariye. While formally independent, Kumme did not rule over a large territory and its rulers were effectively subordinate to Assyria, acting as providers of both resources and information. An Assyrian ambassador (qēpu, literally “trusted one”) named Aššur-rēṣūwa was stationed in the city as well, and at one point seemingly came into conflict with local officials, which lead to mutual assassination attempts, the ultimate outcome of which is presently unknown. If the equivalence between the toponyms Kumme and Qumenu is accepted, the city might also be attested in Urartian sources, including an inscription from Meher Kapısı which mentions the “deity of the inhabitants of the city of Qumenu” (^{uru}qu-me-nu-na-ú-e DINGIR) alongside figures associated with Ardini and Tushpa. The kingdom of Ukku, which was allied with Urartu, apparently attempted to influence Kumme to follow a similar path. A letter sent from Kumme to Sargon II additionally indicates that at one point the Urartian king Argishti II questioned why envoys from the city do not appear in his court, though in this text the local inhabitants reassure the Assyrian king of their loyalty, possibly to avoid a fate similar to Musasir, whose sanctuary of the god Ḫaldi was desecrated as punishment in 714. In texts from the reign of Sennacherib and later rulers, Kumme is no longer mentioned, and its ultimate fate is presently unknown.
